= Paulsgrove Halt railway station =

Former railway station in England

Coordinates: 50°50′52″N 1°05′43″W

Paulsgrove Halt

General information
- Location: Paulsgrove, City of Portsmouth; England
- Grid reference: SU640058
- Platforms: 2

Other information
- Status: Disused

History
- Original company: Southern Railway

Key dates
- 10 August 1928: Opened
- 1 September 1939: Closed
Location

Paulsgrove Halt was a railway station opened in 1928 to serve the adjacent Portsmouth Racecourse, a pony racing stronghold. The racecourse, and station, lay in the Paulsgrove district of Portsmouth, southern England, rather than the modern area now known as Wymering. The station was located on the West Coastway Line between Cosham and Portchester, and generated substantial income within the area.

The funding for the station, along with that for the racecourse, was provided by local businessman George Cooper, who lived at nearby Paulsgrove House and was a keen sports fan. The station was built in the style of a halt rather than a full station.

The station closed along with the racecourse when the land was acquired by the military in 1939, at the outbreak of World War II; it was to be used as an ammunition dump. Since the end of World War II the area has been developed for housing and there have been a number of attempts made to open a station on the same site. Provision for a station has been included in the Local Development Plan of the City of Portsmouth for many years.

On 26 October 2007, Portsmouth F.C. announced plans to relocate to a new 36,000-seat stadium on Horsea Island, which is situated to the south of the former station site. As part of the stadium plans, they are drawing up an integrated transport policy which includes examining the feasibility of opening a station. South West Trains indicated on 29 October 2007, via an interview in the Portsmouth News, that the club's plan may generate sufficient business, even if the station was only opened on match days, for them to consider a further study should the club wish to proceed.

== Gallery ==
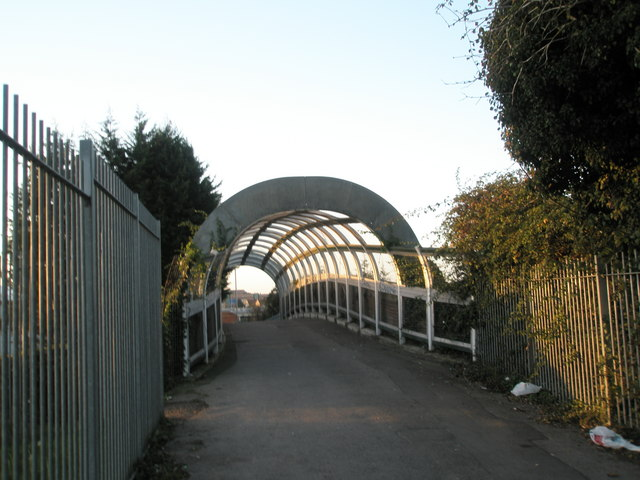
The halt was located by this bridge

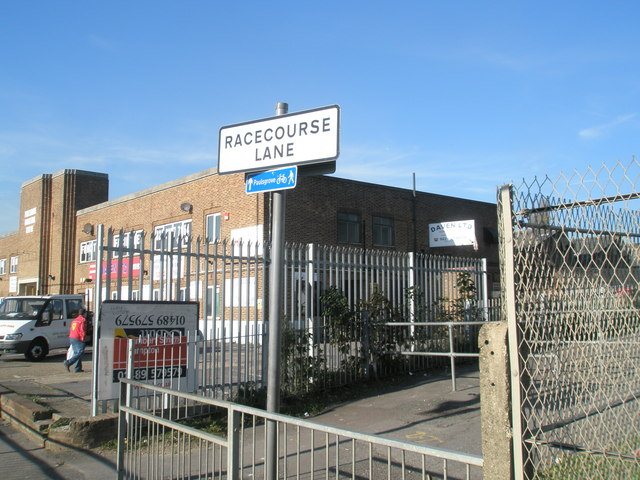
Racecourse Lane, Paulsgrove

Preceding station	Historical railways	Following station
Cosham	Southern Railway	Portchester
