= Hilsea railway station =

Railway station in Hampshire, England

Coordinates: 50°49′41″N 1°03′32″W

Hilsea
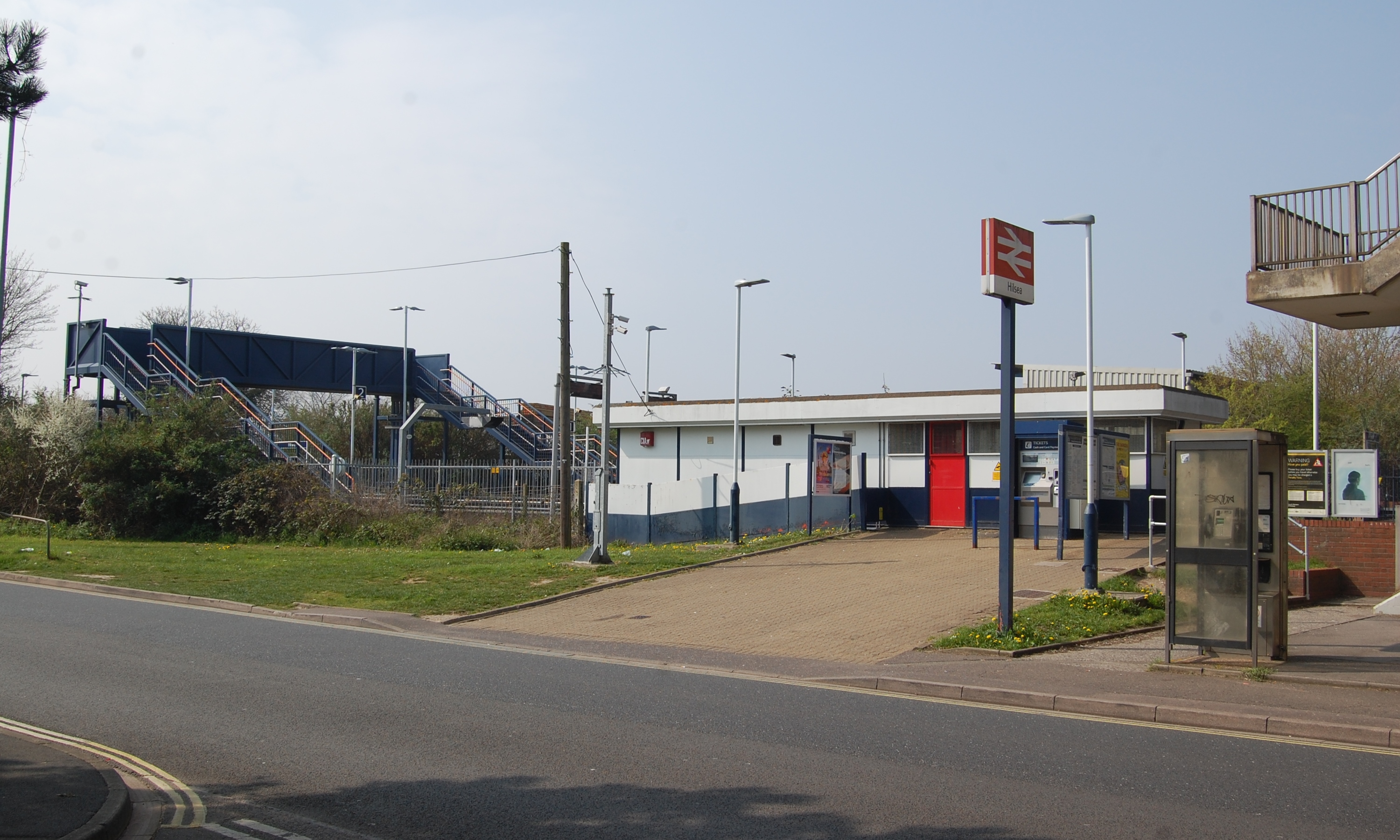

General information
- Location: Hilsea, Portsmouth; England
- Grid reference: SU663035
- Managed by: South Western Railway
- Platforms: 2

Other information
- Station code: HLS
- Classification: DfT category E

History
- Opened: 2 November 1941; 84 years ago
- Original company: Southern Railway

Passengers
- 2020/21: ▼0.133 million
- Interchange: 2,218
- 2021/22: ▲0.277 million
- Interchange: ▲4,741
- 2022/23: ▲0.298 million
- Interchange: ▲5,306
- 2023/24: ▲0.311 million
- Interchange: ▲6,525
- 2024/25: ▲0.360 million
- Interchange: ▲38,086
Location
Notes
- Passenger statistics from the Office of Rail and Road

Hilsea railway station is a railway station on Airport Service Road, Hilsea, Portsmouth, England serving the northern end of Portsea Island, including a large industrial estate nearby. The station was once the closest to Portsmouth Airport, which was closed in 1973.

It is located on the Portsmouth Direct line which runs between London Waterloo and Portsmouth Harbour. There were extensive sidings at Hilsea during World War II.

This railway station is mainly used by commuters who work in nearby Anchorage Park industrial estate. Only stopping trains call here. The station is unstaffed.

Historically, during the Battle of Havant, Hilsea was the terminus of an omnibus link from Havant New, just east of Havant. When the Portsmouth Direct Line had been constructed by the LSWR, at the request of the residents of Portsmouth, it was necessary that trains run from the Portcreek Junction railway triangle, to Havant Junction, along track owned by the rival LBSCR. The latter firm refused to allow that and engaged in militant obstruction of the track to prevent the running of a through train service for several months.

The road that crosses over the railway line and station at Hilsea is named Norway Road after the novelist and aeronautical engineer, Nevil Shute Norway.

== Services ==
Services at Hilsea are operated by South Western Railway and Southern using Classes 377, 444 and 450 EMUs.

The typical off-peak service in trains per hour is:

- 1 tph to London Waterloo via Guildford
- 1 tph to London Waterloo via Basingstoke
- 2 tph to London Victoria via Horsham
- 1 tph to Southampton Central
- 5 tph to Portsmouth & Southsea of which 4 continue to Portsmouth Harbour

During the peak hours, there are additional services to London Waterloo as well as services to and from Brighton and Littlehampton.

On Sundays, the services to London Waterloo via Guildford and to London Victoria, do not run, and the service to Portsmouth & Southsea reduces to 2tph, with 1 of these continuing to Portsmouth Harbour.

Preceding station	National Rail	Following station
Bedhampton	South Western Railway; Portsmouth Direct line	Fratton
Cosham	South Western Railway; West Coastway line	Fratton
Havant	Southern; West Coastway line	Fratton
Bedhampton Limited Service	Southern; West Coastway line	Fratton

== Gallery ==
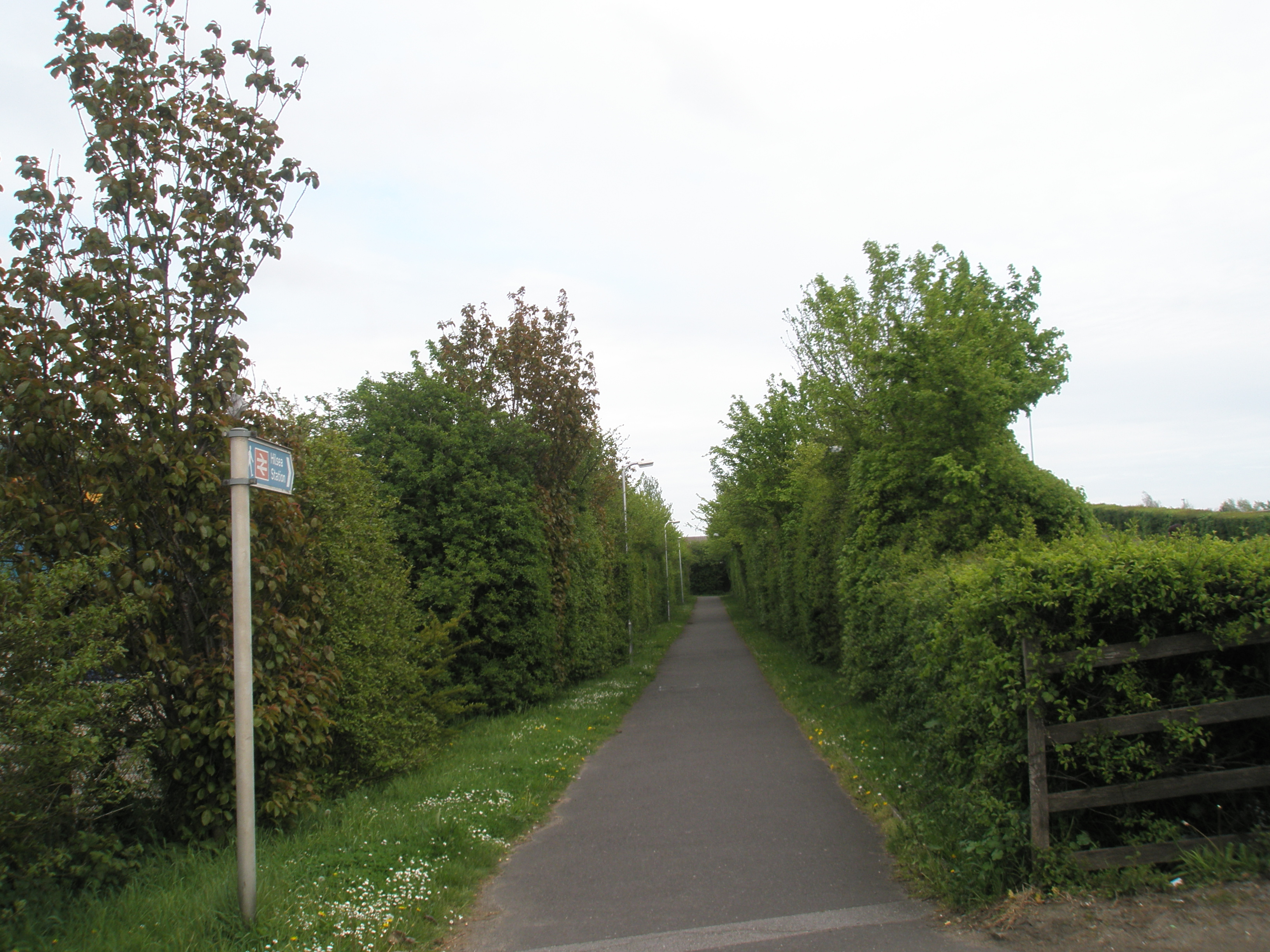

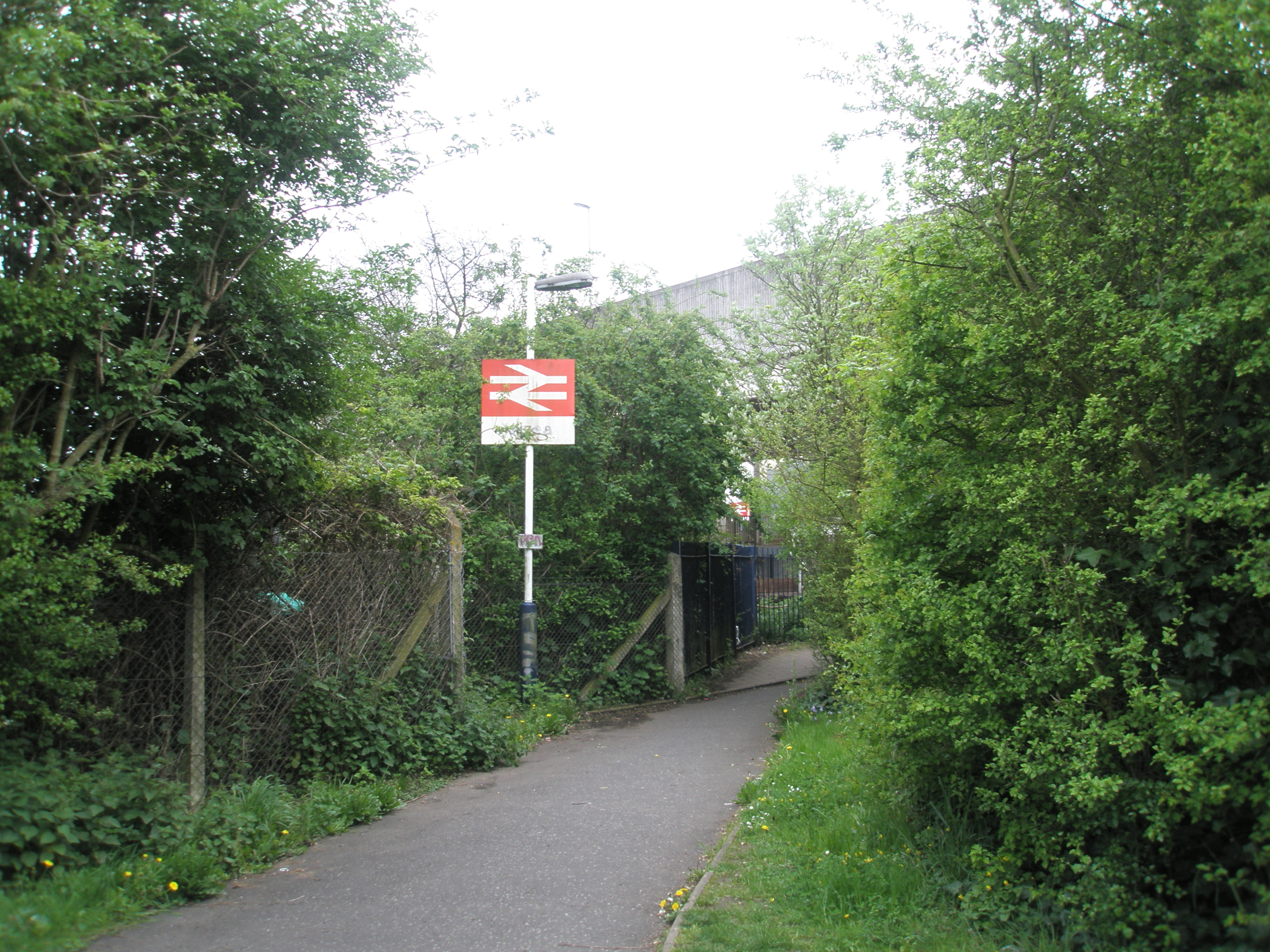

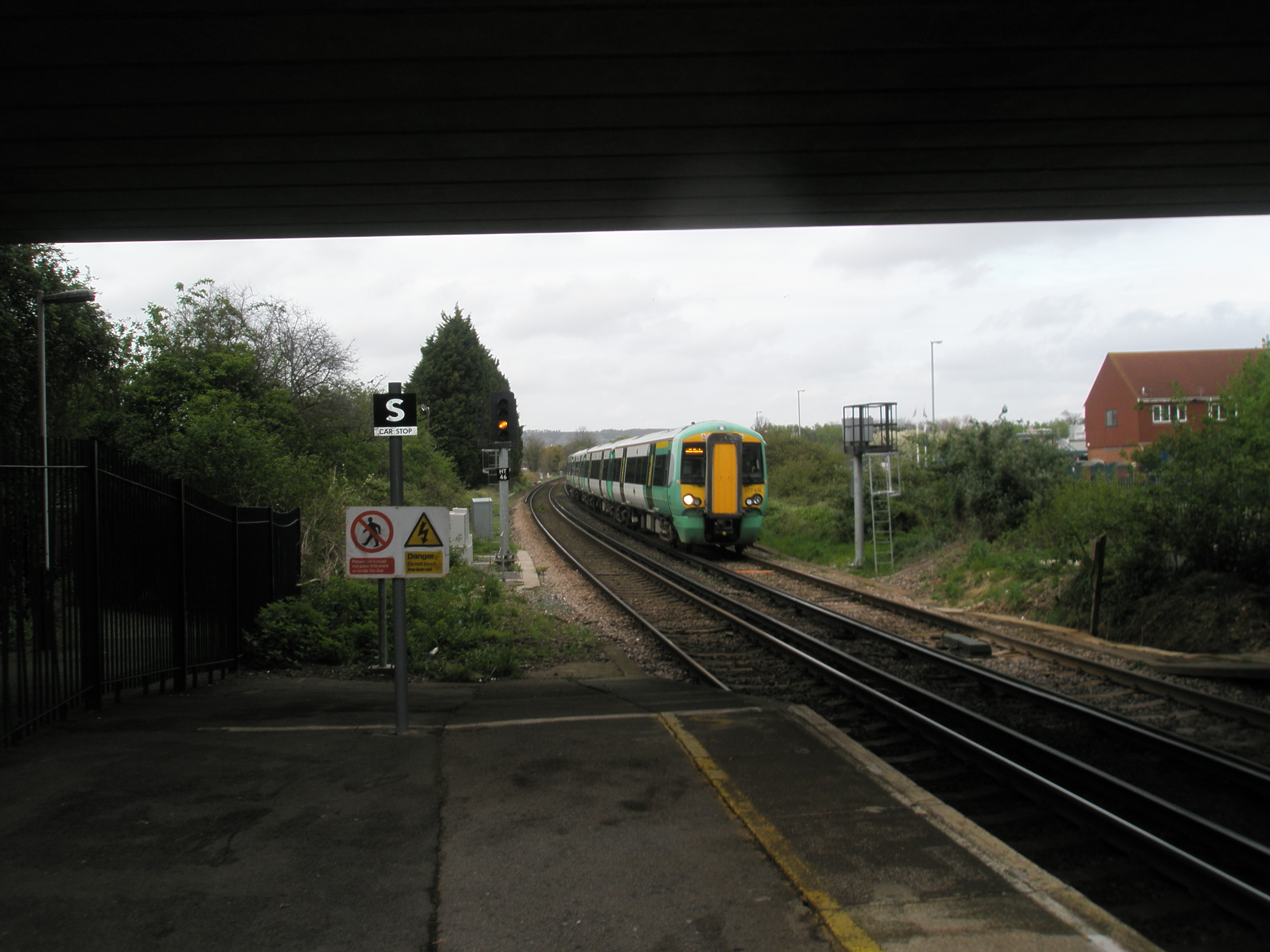

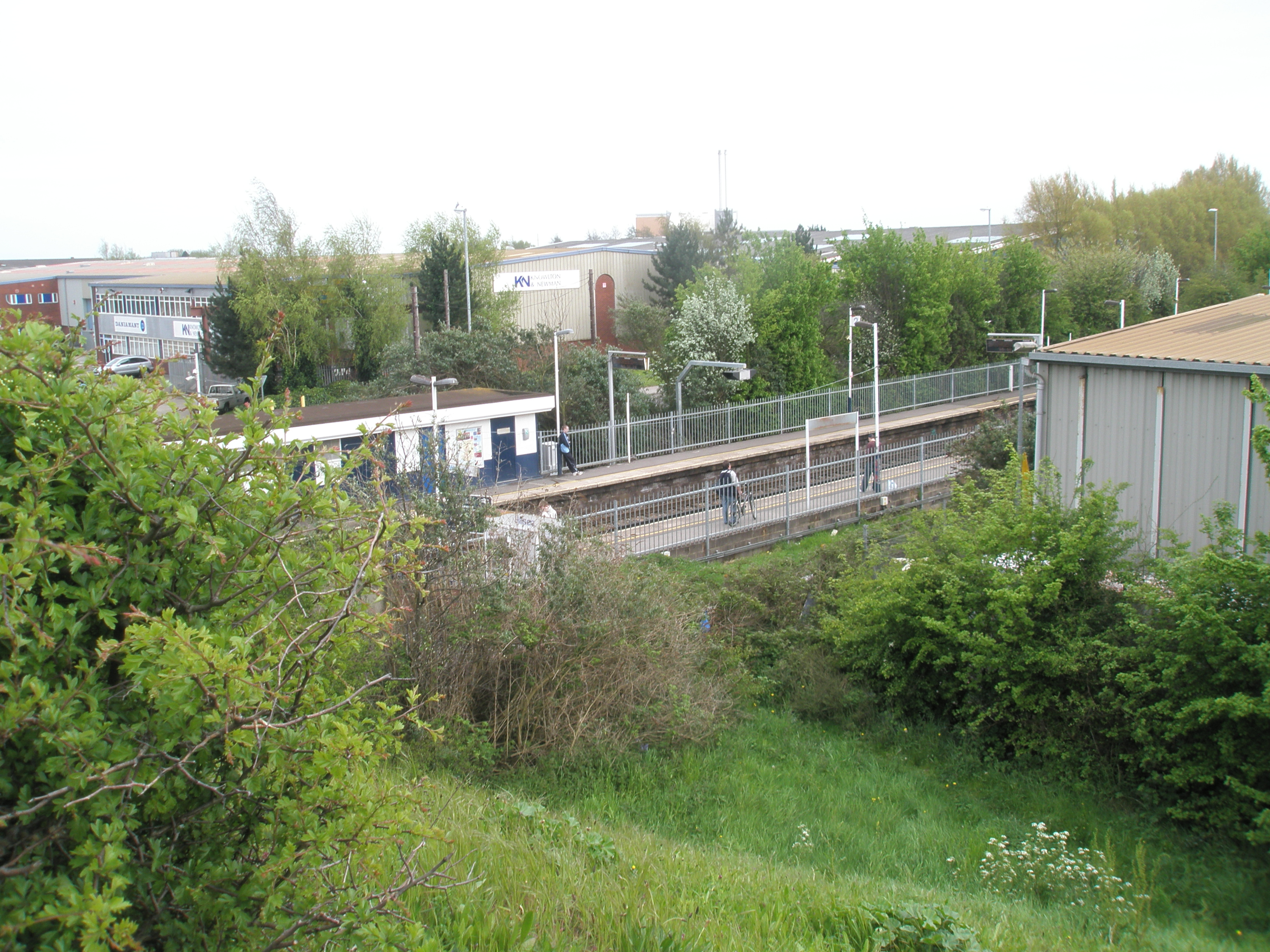

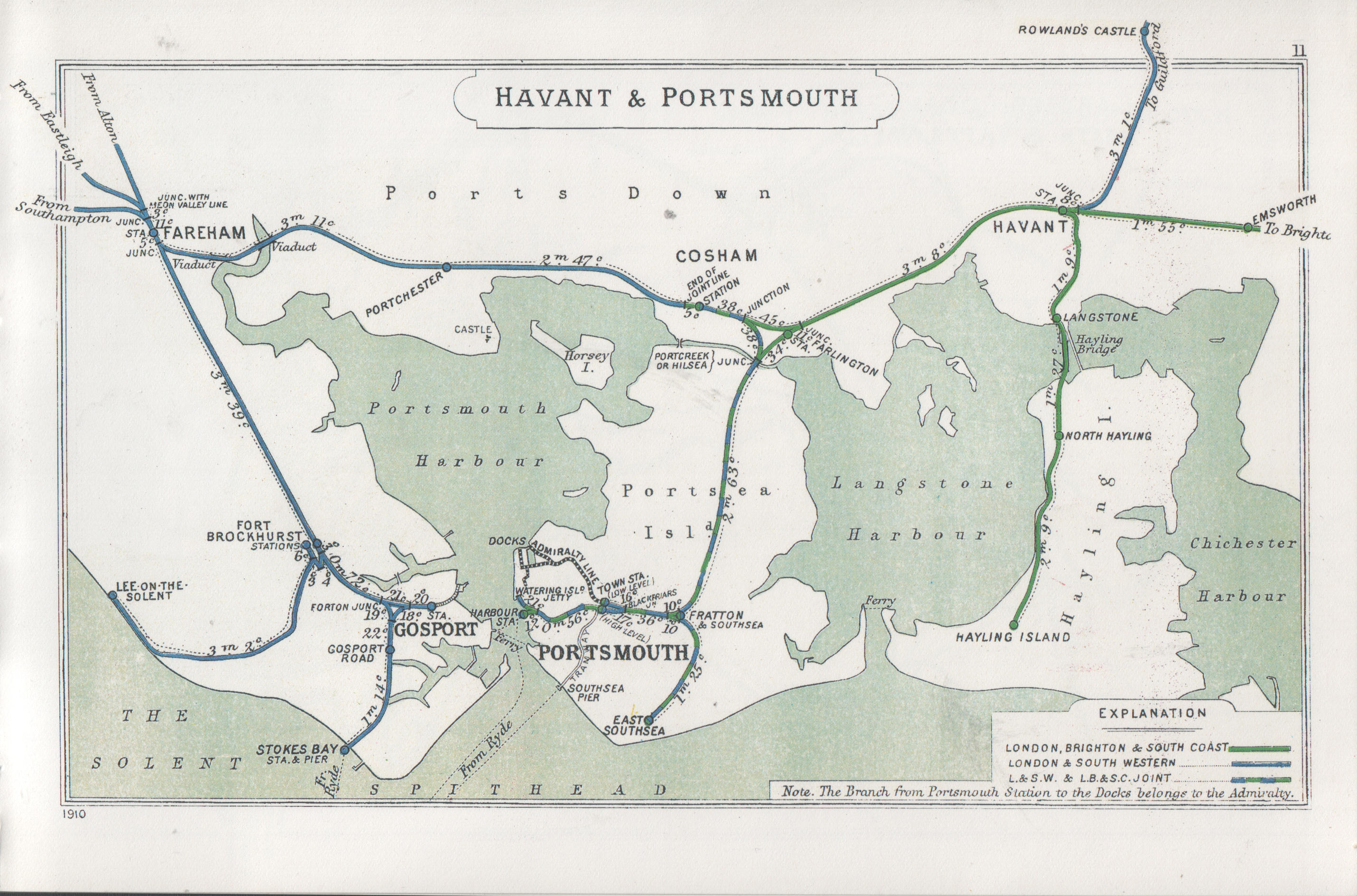
A 1910 Railway Clearing House map of lines around Hilsea railway station
