= Fareham railway station =

Railway station in Hampshire, England

Coordinates: 50.852934°N 1.191898°W

Fareham
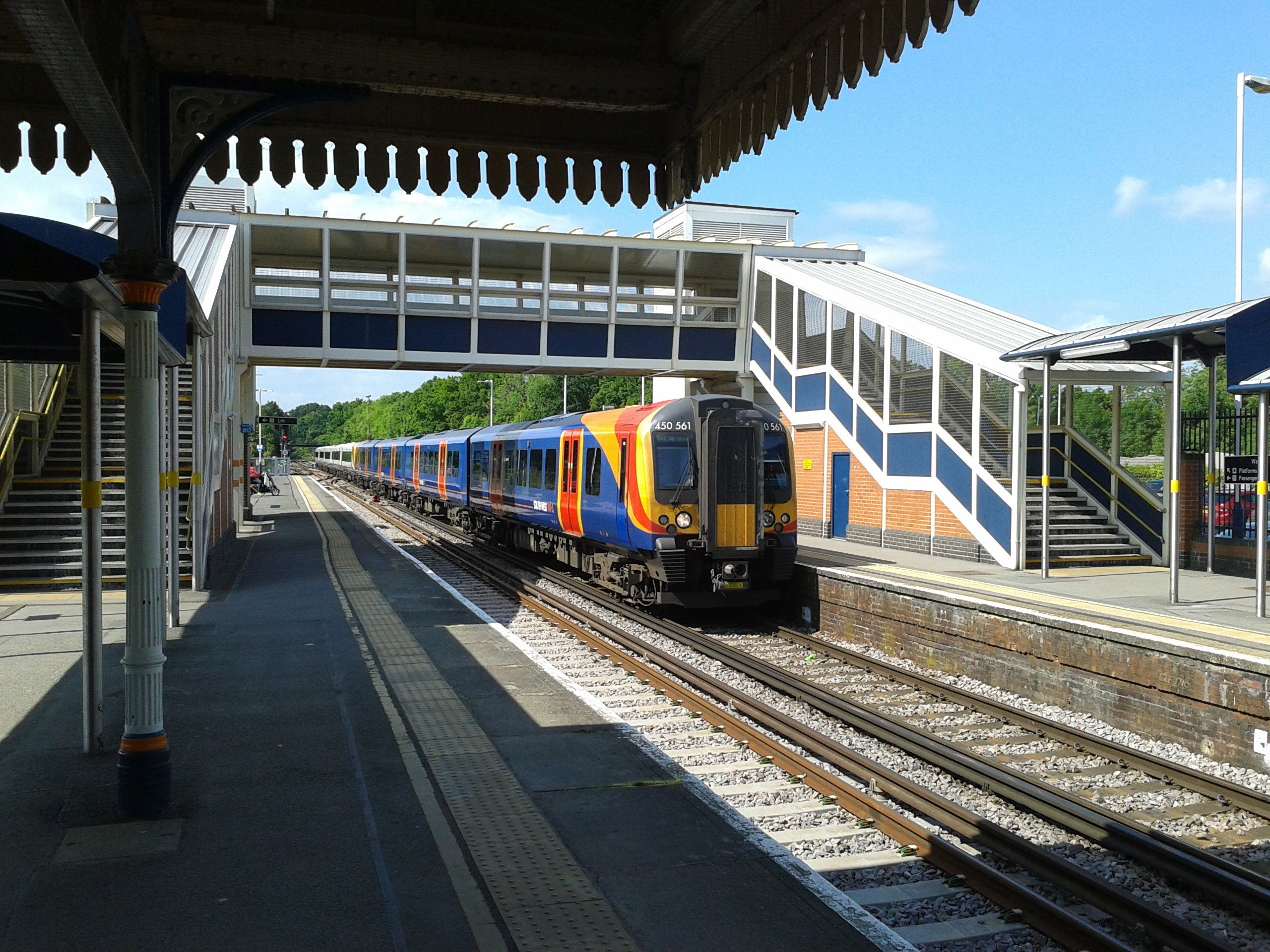
- Fareham station, showing the replacement footbridge

General information
- Location: Fareham, Fareham; England
- Grid reference: SU569063
- Manager: South Western Railway
- Platforms: 3

Other information
- Station code: FRM
- Classification: DfT category C2

History
- Opened: 29 November 1841
- Original company: London and South Western Railway
- Pre-grouping: London and South Western Railway
- Post-grouping: Southern Railway

Passengers
- 2020/21: ▼0.476 million
- Interchange: ▼38,165
- 2021/22: ▲1.245 million
- Interchange: ▲0.105 million
- 2022/23: ▲1.415 million
- Interchange: ▲0.125 million
- 2023/24: ▲1.508 million
- Interchange: ▲0.135 million
- 2024/25: ▲1.740 million
- Interchange: ▲0.148 million
Location
Notes
- Passenger statistics from the Office of Rail and Road

Fareham railway station is on the West Coastway Line, situated about 0.62 miles (1 km) from the town of Fareham in Hampshire, England. It is 84 miles 21 chains (135.6 km) down the line from London Waterloo.

== History ==
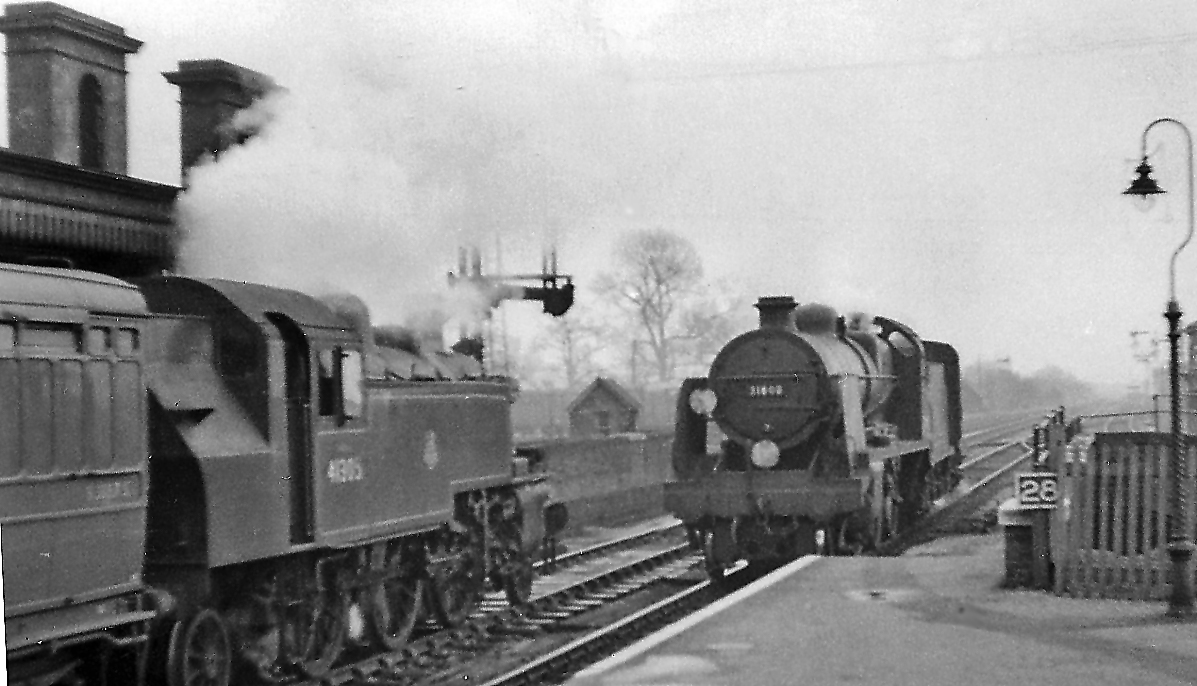
Stopping trains cross at Fareham in 1955

Fareham station was first opened by the London and South Western Railway (LSWR) in 1841, on the line from Eastleigh to Gosport. Later additions in 1848 connected Fareham station with Southampton, Portsmouth and along the coast towards Brighton. These later lines are now the most valuable but, as a consequence of the later construction, there is a sharp curve upon exiting the station to Portsmouth and a lesser one towards Southampton. A 20 mph speed limit protects the area surrounding the station, mainly due to the sharp curve on the Portsmouth side.

The original line, now singled through Fareham Tunnel, to Eastleigh and London, is dead straight, as is the former Gosport route which closed to passengers in 1953. Track remains overgrown in places on the Gosport route, although most of it has now been cleared for a bus express route from Fareham to the Gosport ferry, operated by First Hampshire & Dorset. The line formerly saw freight services to a Royal Navy ordnance factory at Bedenham up unto March 1991 but, after closure, the track was removed.

There was also a line to Alton via the Meon Valley, which opened in 1903; it branched from the Eastleigh route at Knowle, north of the tunnel. It was built initially as a fast route to the Isle of Wight - to express standards though only a single line on double track earthworks - at a time when Stokes Bay, not Portsmouth Harbour, was the primary rail-connected ferry terminus for the island; this route closed to passengers in 1955.

In the early 21st century, a new footbridge and lifts were erected to the north of the station buildings and canopies. The lifts allows the station to comply with the Equality Act 2010, providing wheelchair access to all platforms. Related work has included fitting tactile strips to all three platforms. Work commenced in October 2008 and was undertaken by Osborne Rail Division. The ticket office was reopened with a new entrance to the platform at the south end of the corridor. Ticket barriers were also installed and a new station shop constructed at the end of the station building on platform 3.

== Description ==
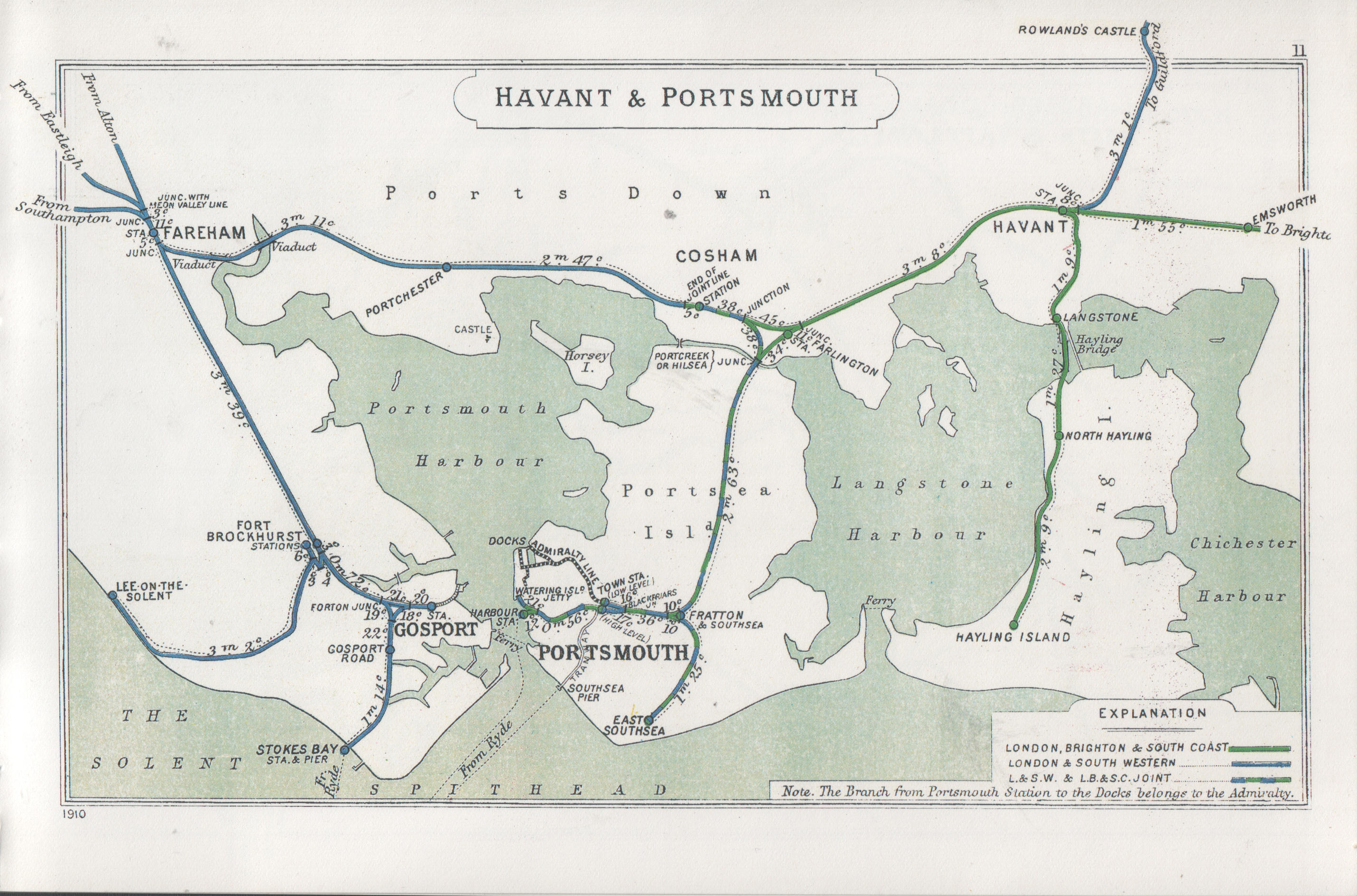
A 1910 Railway Clearing House map of lines around Fareham station

Fareham station is a stop on the West Coastway Line, which runs between Brighton and Southampton Central. It is now served by South Western Railway, Southern and Great Western Railway. The station is approached from the east by two prominent viaducts, Cams Hill Viaduct and the Quay Street Viaduct, which are both prominent landmarks and Grade II listed buildings.

It has three platforms:

- Platform 1 is the main up platform and serves Southampton Central, Cardiff Central and London Waterloo, via Winchester and Basingstoke.
- Platform 2 is a bay platform and has very little planned use; however, it is used periodically when late running Great Western and Southern services are terminated short of destination or during engineering works. It was formerly the main up platform, before the stone arched bridge over the A27, immediately south of the station, was replaced; the opportunity was taken to ease the radius of the curve from Portsmouth by aligning the route into the current platform 1.
- Platform 3 is the down platform for services towards Portsmouth Harbour, Brighton and London Victoria. The bay platform for services to Alton via the closed Meon Valley Line was on the opposite (car park) side of this platform, a short siding is all that remains at the north end of the platform.

== Services ==
Services at Fareham are operated by Southern, South Western Railway and Great Western Railway using Class 377, 444 and 450 EMUs and Class 158, 165 and 166 DMUs.

The typical off-peak service in trains per hour is:

- 1 tph to London Waterloo via Basingstoke
- 2 tph to Brighton via Worthing
- 4 tph to Southampton Central, of which 1 continues to Cardiff Central via Bristol Temple Meads
- 3 tph to Portsmouth & Southsea of which 2 continue to Portsmouth Harbour

The station is also served by limited Southern and Great Western Railway services to and from Southampton that run via Eastleigh instead of Swanwick.

Preceding station	National Rail	Following station
Swanwick	South Western Railway West Coastway Line	Portchester
Botley	South Western Railway Eastleigh to Fareham Line	Portchester
Swanwick	Southern West Coastway Line	Portchester or Cosham
Eastleigh Limited Service	Southern West Coastway Line	Portchester or Cosham
Southampton Central	Great Western Railway West Coastway Line	Cosham
Botley Limited Service	Great Western Railway West Coastway Line	Portchester Limited Service
	Disused railways	
Fort Brockhurst	London & South Western Railway Meon Valley Line and Fareham to Gosport Line	Knowle Halt
