= Bedhampton railway station =

Railway station in Hampshire, England

Coordinates: 50°51′13″N 0°59′49″W

Bedhampton
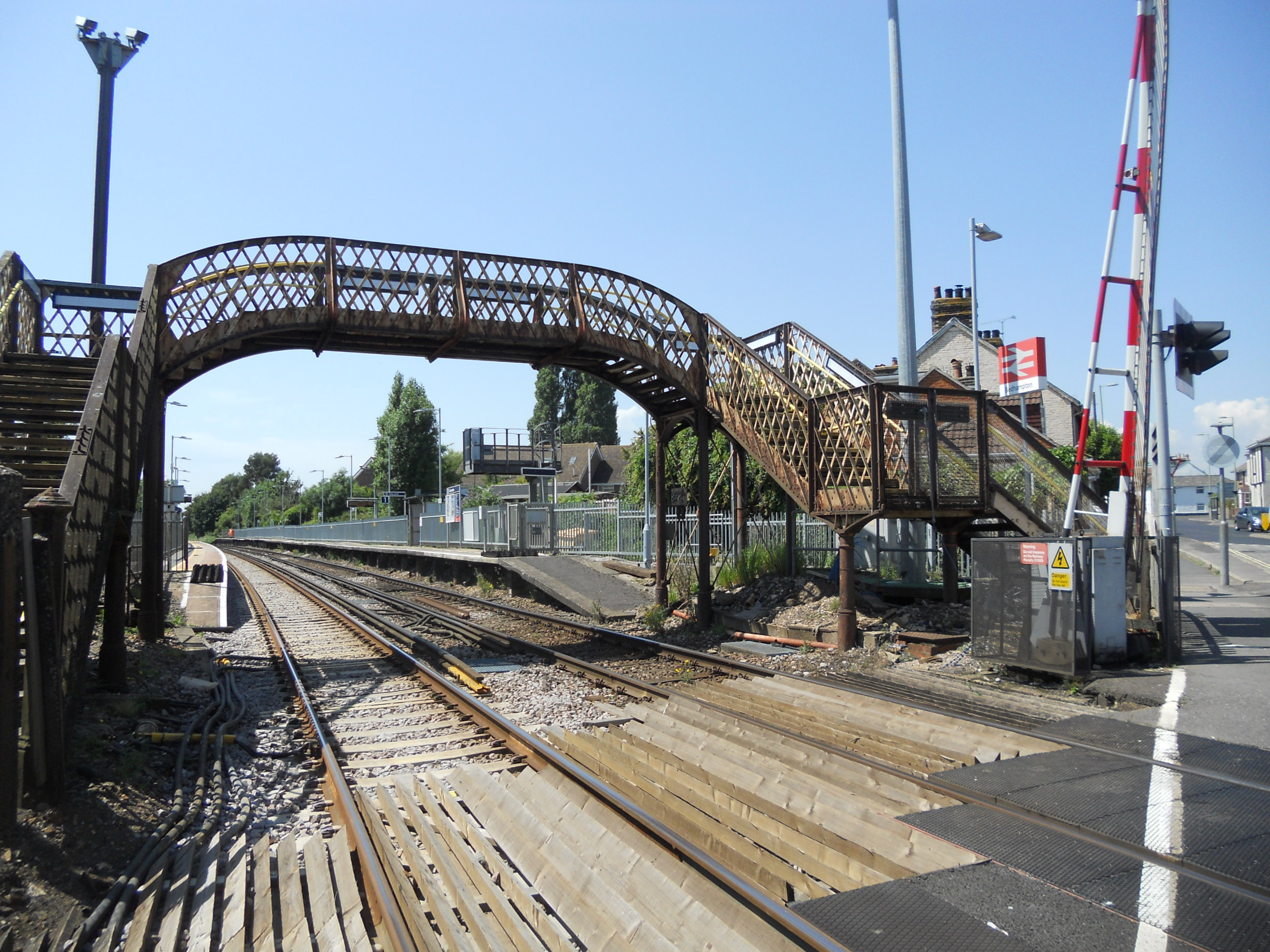
- Bedhampton Station

General information
- Location: Bedhampton, Havant; England
- Grid reference: SU707065
- Managed by: South Western Railway
- Platforms: 2

Other information
- Station code: BDH
- Classification: DfT category E

History
- Opened: 1 April 1906

Passengers
- 2020/21: ▼43,624
- 2021/22: ▲86,884
- 2022/23: ▲90,032
- 2023/24: ▲0.101 million
- 2024/25: ▼86,206
Location
Notes
- Passenger statistics from the Office of Rail and Road

Bedhampton railway station serves the former village of Bedhampton, now a suburb lying a mile west of the centre of Havant, in Hampshire, England.

== History ==
Opened in 1906 as "Bedhampton Halt", the station was at first staffed separately, but in the late 1940s it came under the control of Havant; since then it has been staffed only part time.

In August 2007, the old platform surfaces were resurfaced, new shelters and a railway crossing were added, and Platform 1 (Havant bound) was extended to make it suitable for longer trains.

== Facilities ==
The station has a ticket office on the Portsmouth bound platform, which is staffed during weekday and Saturday mornings. At other, the station is unstaffed and tickets can be purchased from the self-service ticket machine at the station.

Both platforms are fitted with shelters and modern help points and there is also bicycle storage available at the station. Step-free access is available to both platforms at the station.

== Services ==
Services at Bedhampton are operated by South Western Railway using Classes 444 and 450 EMUs. Southern also operate a limited service from the station using Class 377 EMUs

The typical off-peak service in trains per hour is:

- 1 tph to London Waterloo via Guildford
- 1 tph to Portsmouth Harbour

During the peak hours, there are additional services to London Waterloo as well to Portsmouth Harbour.

South Western Railway also operate a single late evening service to Southampton Central that runs directly from Bedhampton to Cosham. Southern also call a small number of trains here in the early mornings and late evenings.

On Sundays, Southern serve the station with an hourly service from Brighton to Portsmouth Harbour

Preceding station	National Rail	Following station
Havant	South Western Railway Portsmouth Direct line	Cosham Limited Service
Havant	South Western Railway Portsmouth Direct line	Hilsea
Havant	Southern West Coastway line Limited Service	Hilsea

== Bus Connections ==
The station is served by the Stagecoach South route 23 which provides regular connections to Leigh Park, Havant, Portsmouth and Southsea.

== Gallery ==
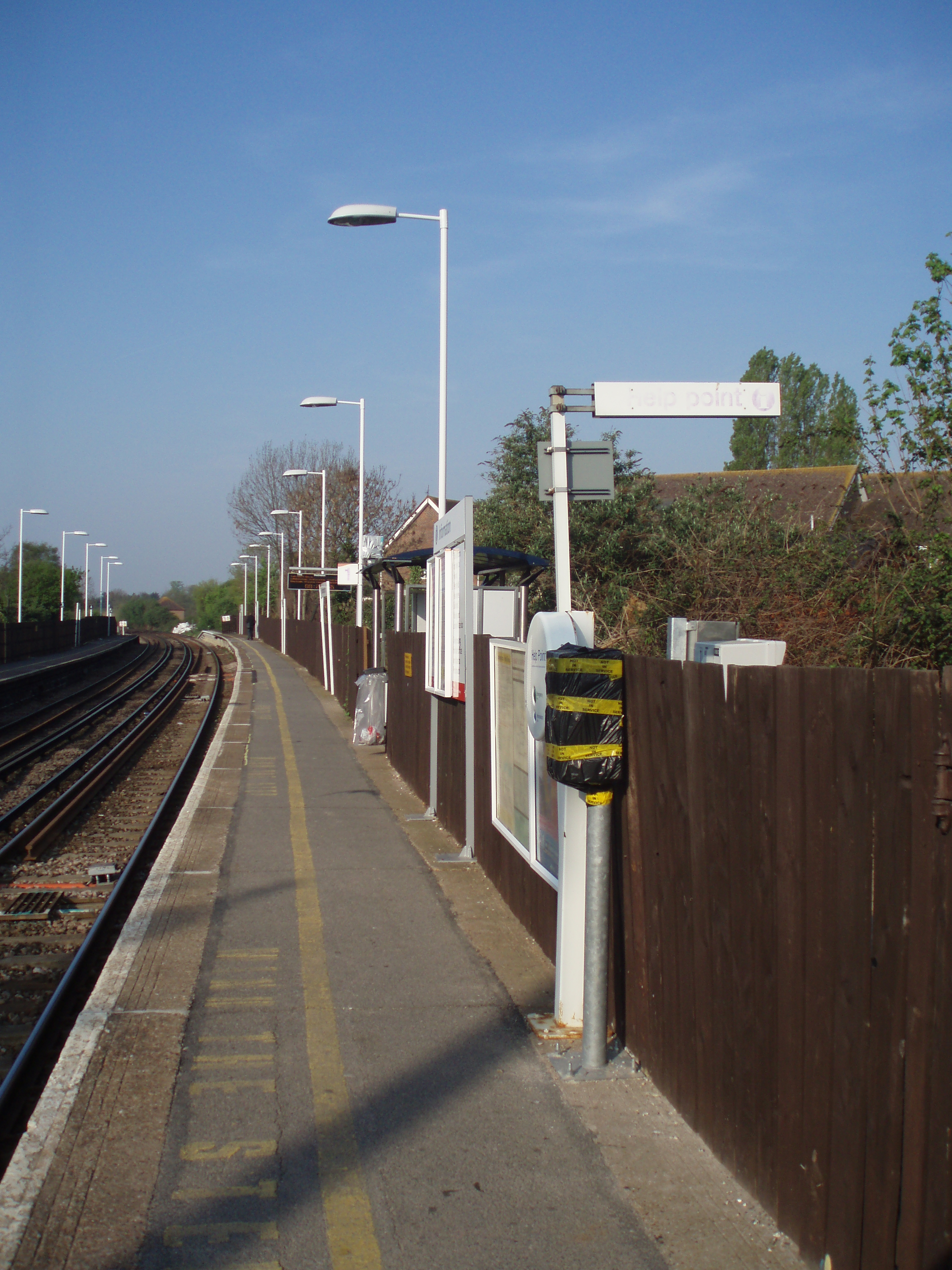
Platform 1 (up)

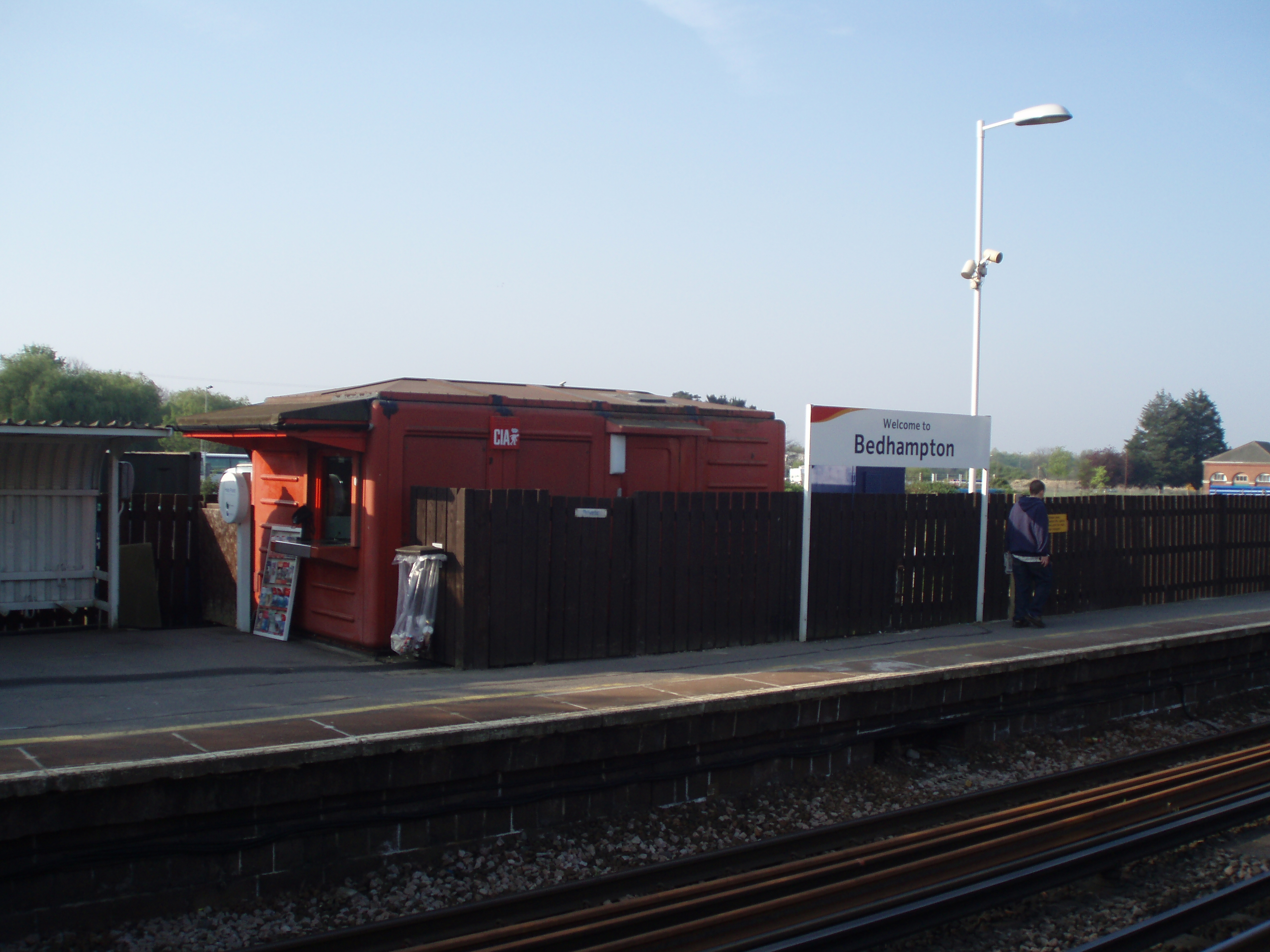
Platform 2 (down), with ticket office

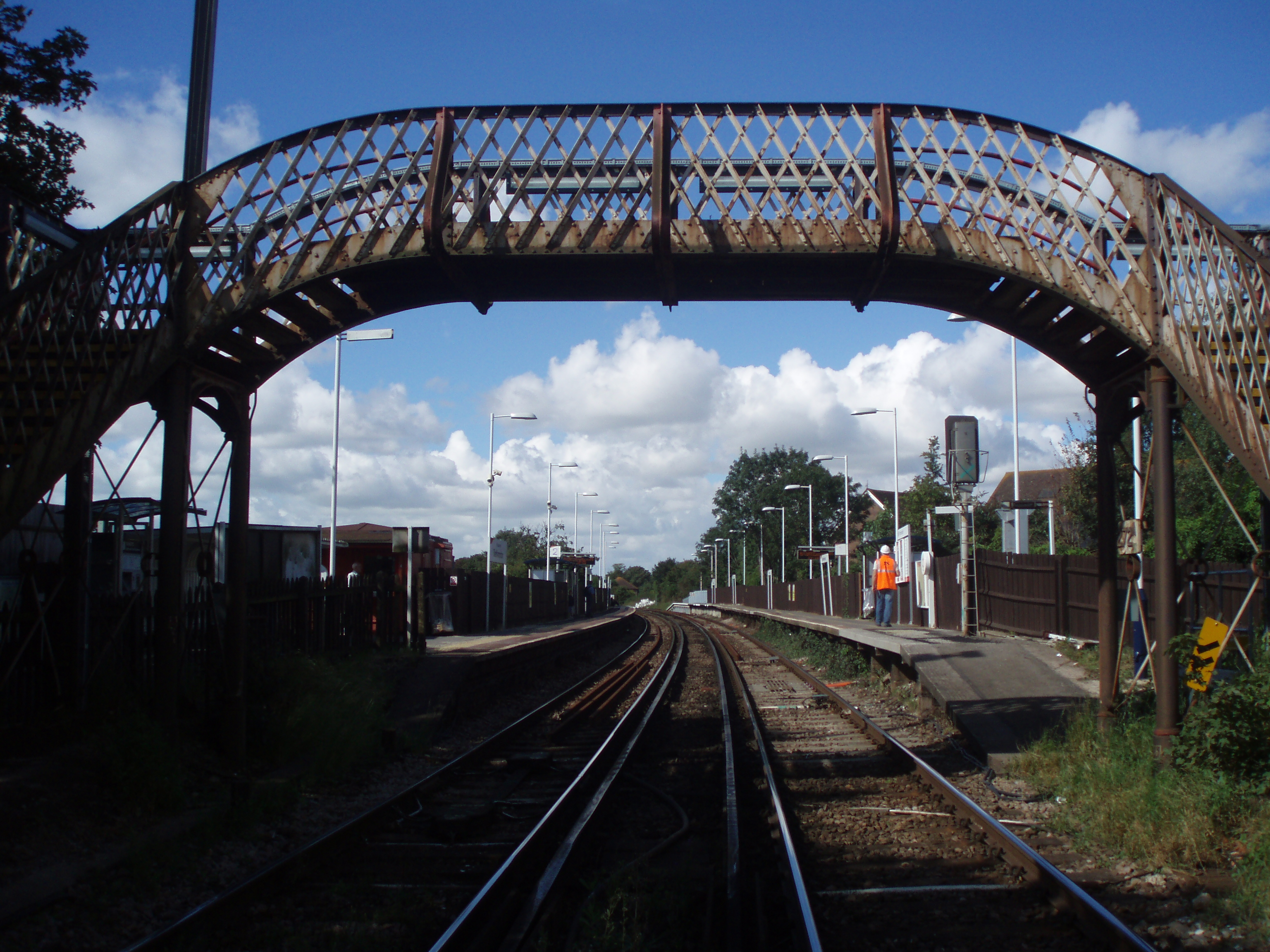
View southwestward from the level crossing

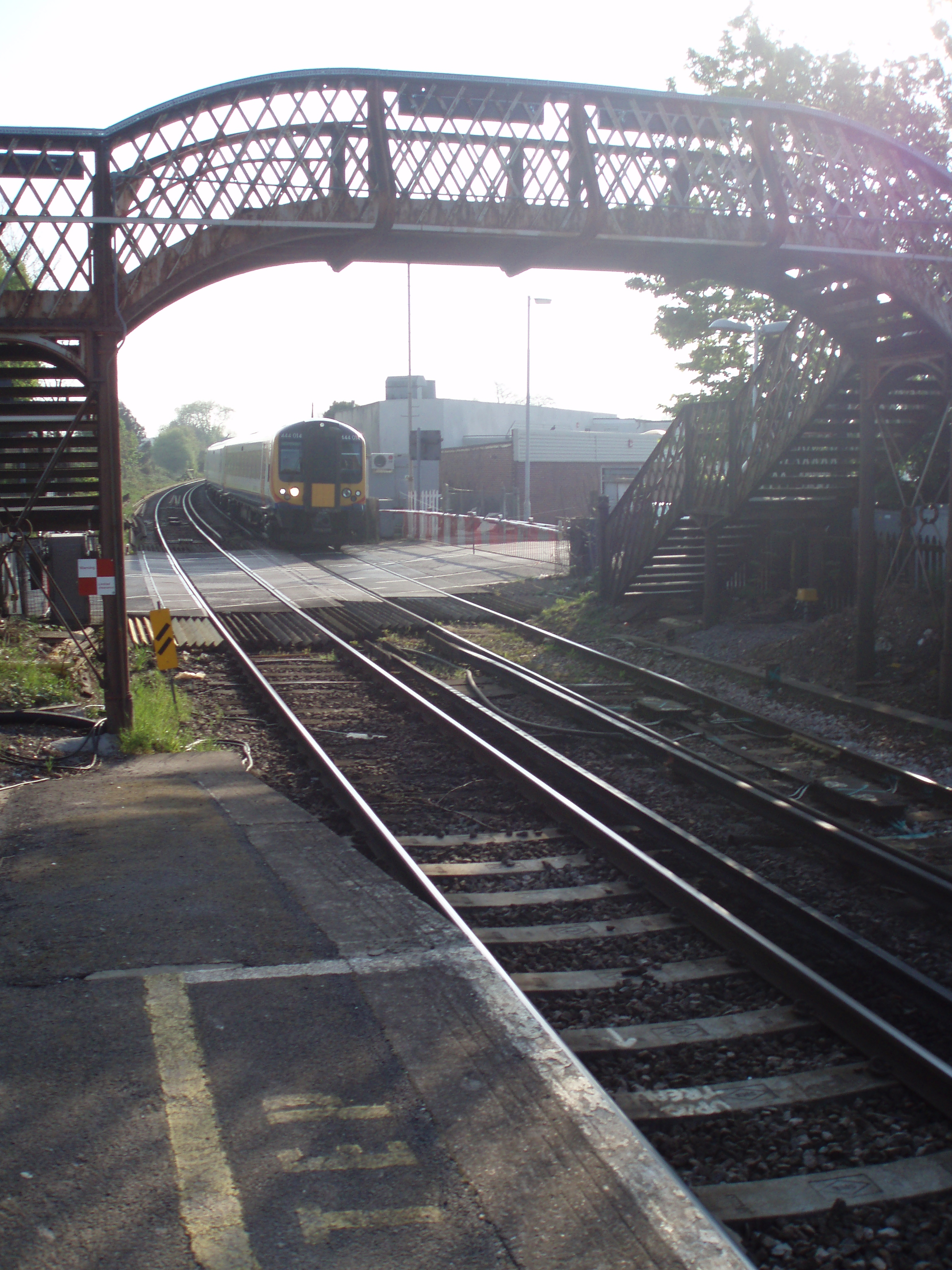
A train arrives from Havant

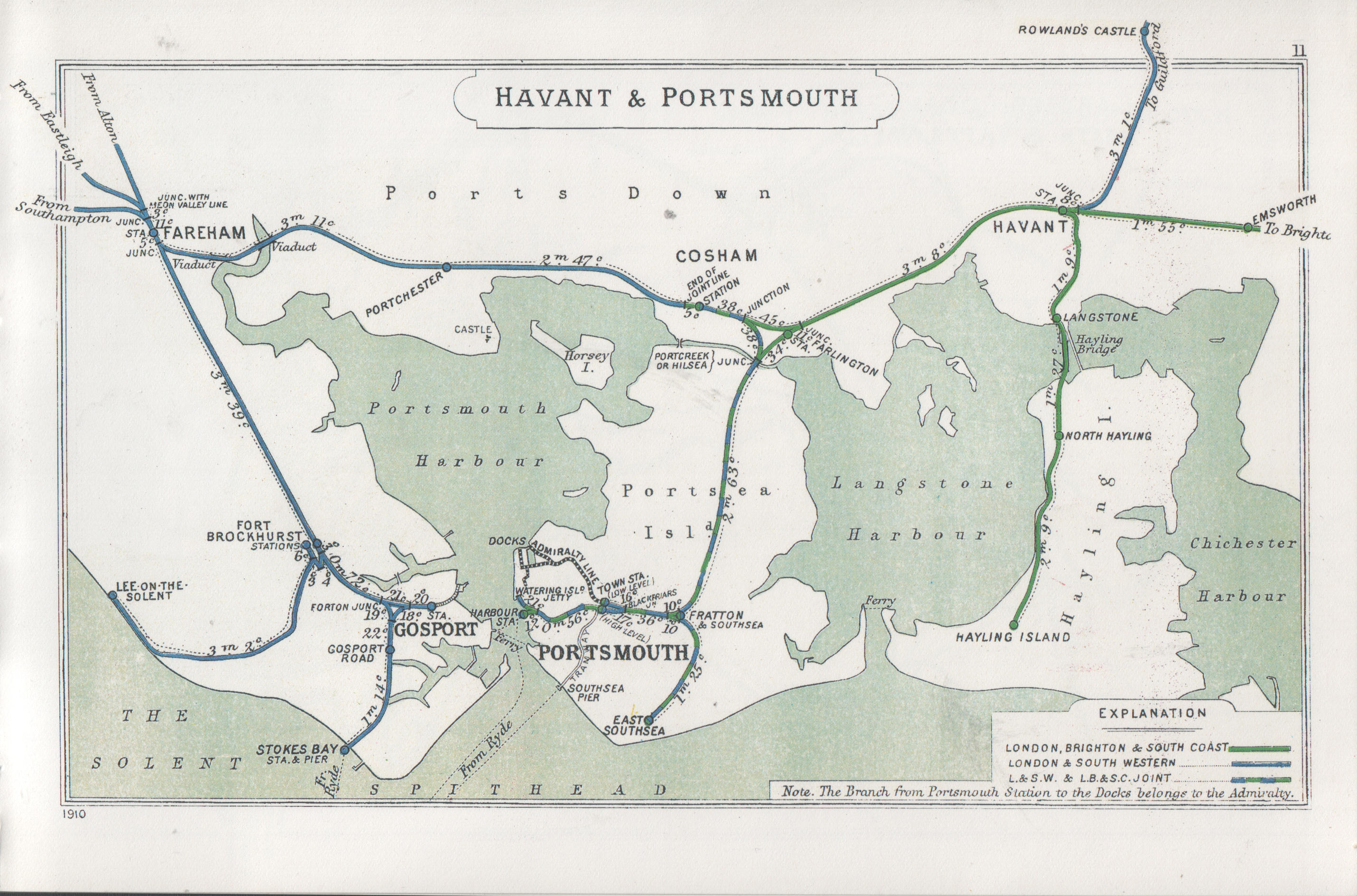
A 1910 Railway Clearing House map of lines around Bedhampton railway station

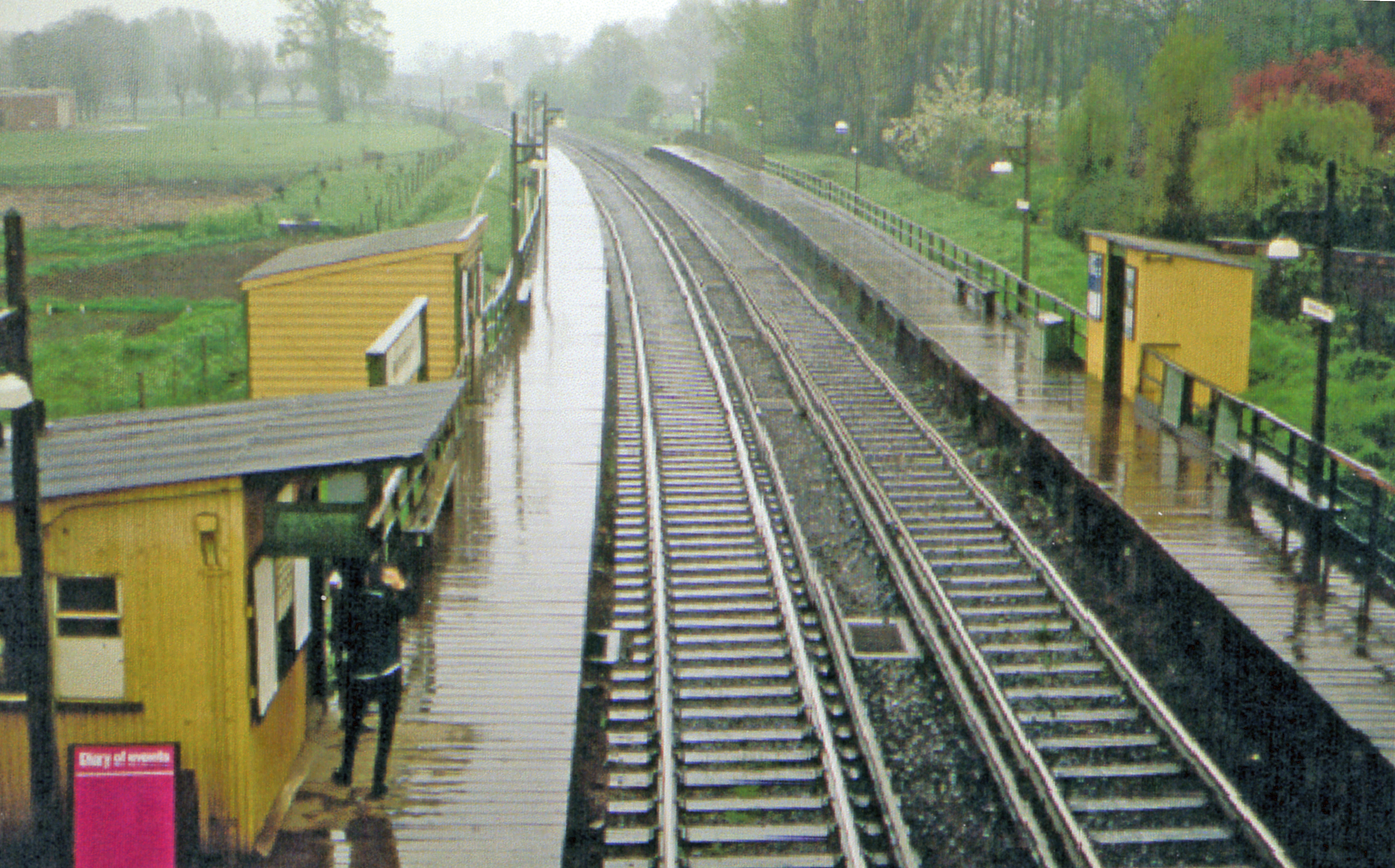
Bedhampton Halt, 1968

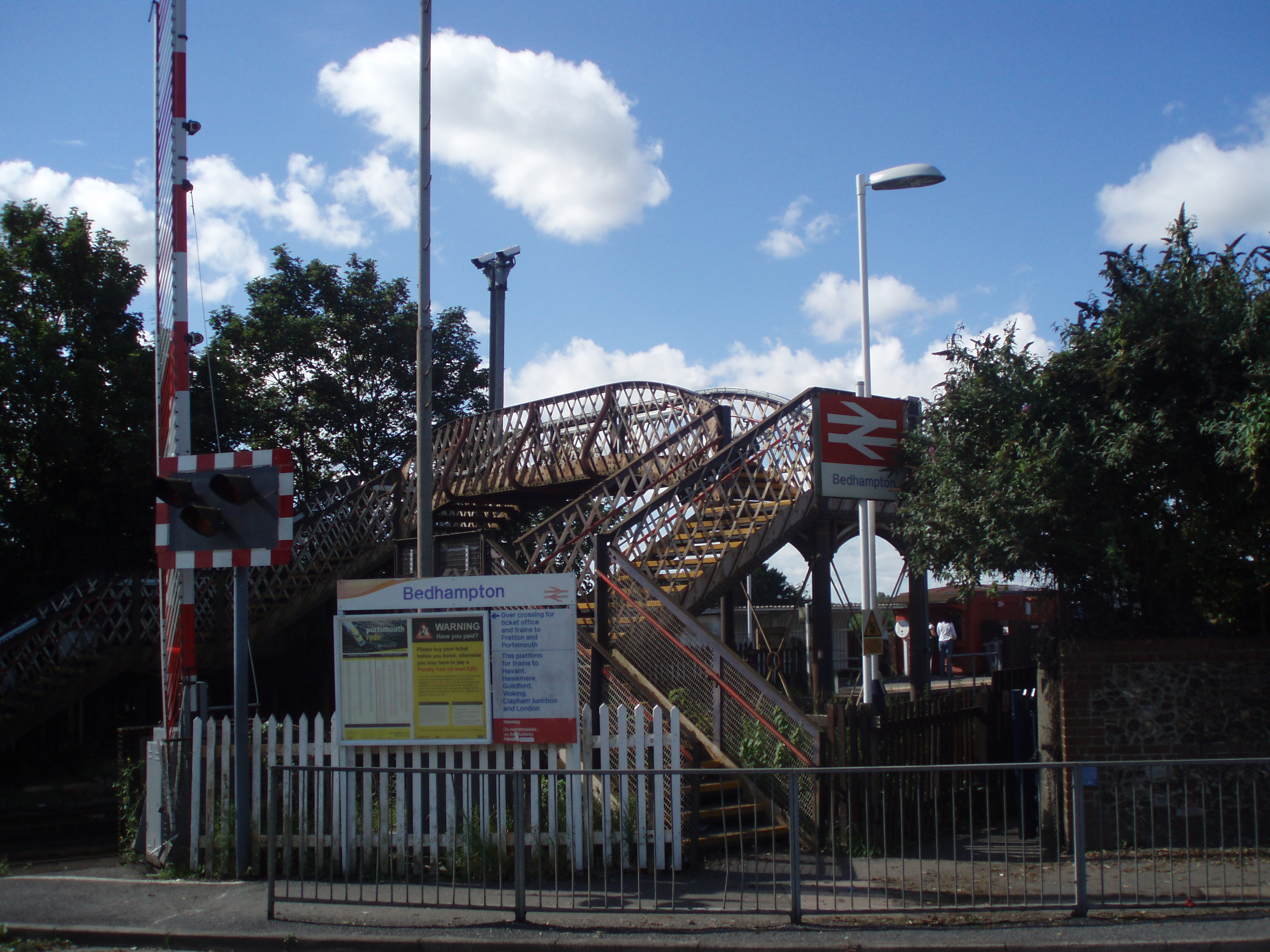
station entrance
