= Havant New railway station =

Former railway station in England

Coordinates: 50°51′28″N 0°58′10″W

Havant New

General information
- Location: Denvilles, Borough of Havant; England
- Platforms: ?

Other information
- Status: Disused

History
- Opened: 1 January 1859; 167 years ago
- Closed: 24 January 1859; 167 years ago
- Original company: London and South Western Railway
Location

Havant New was a temporary L&SWR platform between Havant and Rowlands Castle. The L&SWR had permission to run trains to Portsmouth on the Portsmouth Direct Line, which ran between Godalming and Havant. However, the track between Havant and Portsmouth was owned by the LB&SCR, which refused to allow L&SWR trains on its track.

== Battle of Havant ==
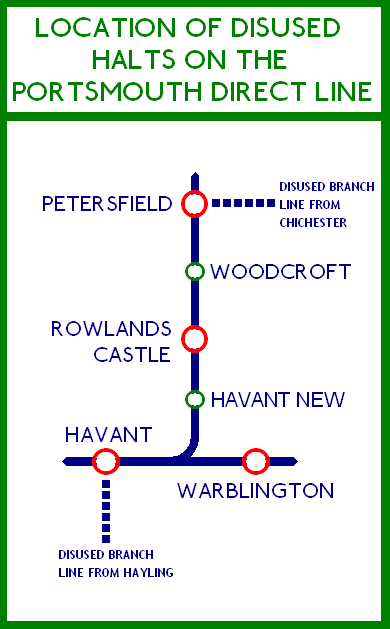

In 1858, the two local railway companies started the "Battle of Havant". The London, Brighton and South Coast Railway ran the London to Portsmouth Line via Hove, and refused to allow the London and South Western Railway to use any of that track to reach Portsmouth. The LB&SCR blocked the line just north of the intended junction, prompting the L&SWR to open a temporary station at Havant. The station was opened on 1 January 1859. Passengers would travel from Havant New in a horse-drawn omnibus to Hilsea, bypassing Havant. The passengers could then carry on into Portsmouth by train. After two years the companies came to an agreement and the L&SWR were allowed access to the disputed line. The station closed on 24 January 1859.

== The site today ==
Nothing remains of the station today; the site is marked only by some old semaphore signal posts, some slates and a platelayers' hut. The station was the only one on the line built of blue bricks. The surrounds were not developed at the time of the station's existence so having fulfilled its political function it closed, in 1859.

== See also ==
- Frog wars
