= Havant railway station =

Railway station in Hampshire, England

Coordinates: 50.854°N 0.982°W

Havant
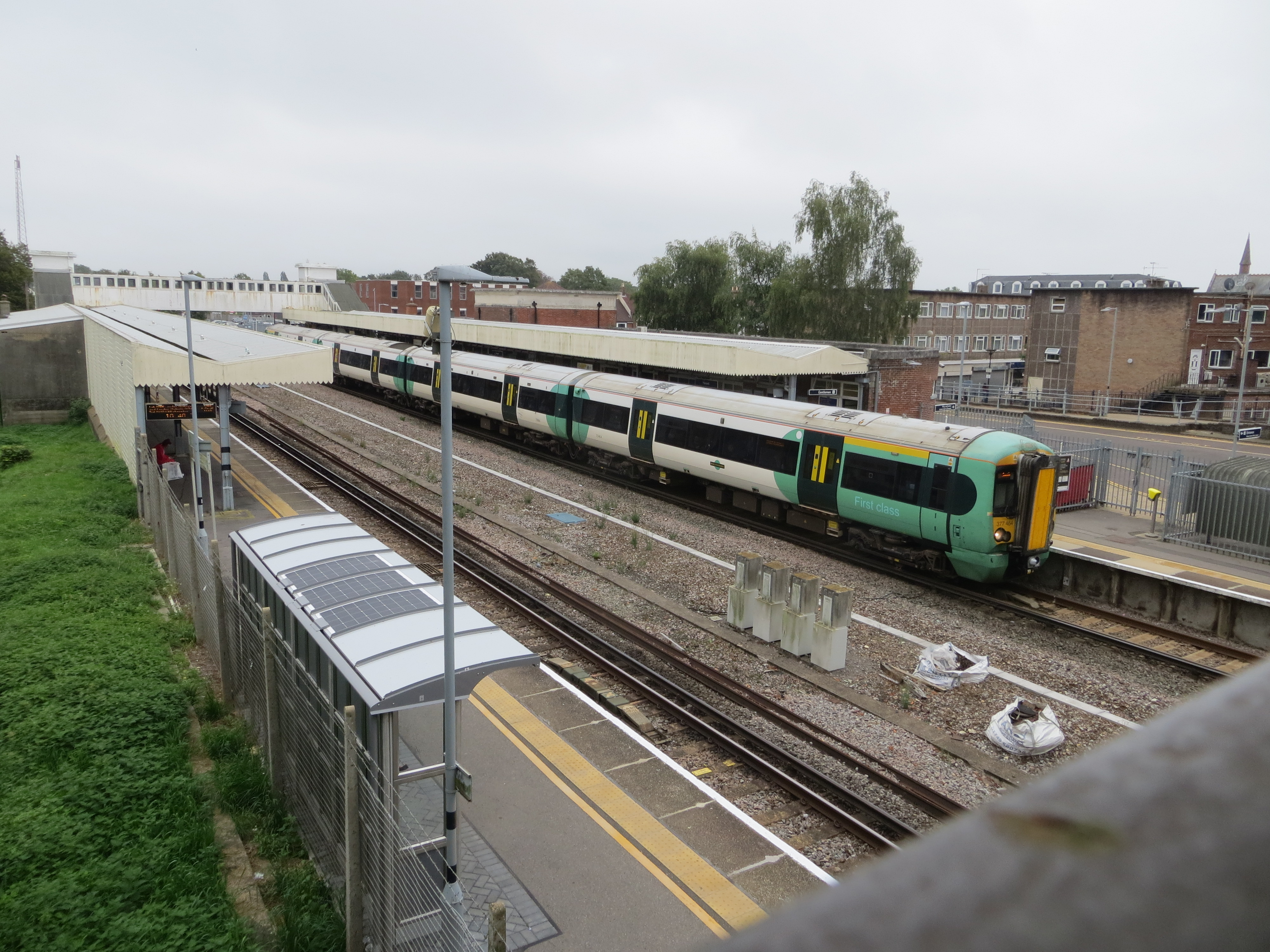
- A Southern Class 377 at the station

General information
- Location: Havant, Borough of Havant, England
- Grid reference: SU717065
- Managed by: South Western Railway
- Platforms: 2

Other information
- Station code: HAV
- Classification: DfT category C2

History
- Opened: 15 March 1847

Key dates
- 1863: resited

Passengers
- 2020/21: ▼0.682 million
- Interchange: ▼95,239
- 2021/22: ▲1.631 million
- Interchange: ▲0.228 million
- 2022/23: ▲1.848 million
- Interchange: ▲0.276 million
- 2023/24: ▲1.890 million
- Interchange: ▲0.316 million
- 2024/25: ▲2.083 million
- Interchange: ▼0.283 million
Location
Notes
- Passenger statistics from the Office of Rail & Road

Havant railway station serves the town of Havant, in Hampshire, England, along with Hayling Island and Waterlooville. Located near to Portsmouth, it lies on the Portsmouth Direct Line which runs between London Waterloo and Portsmouth Harbour. The station is managed by South Western Railway which provides services calling at the station along with Southern.

== History ==
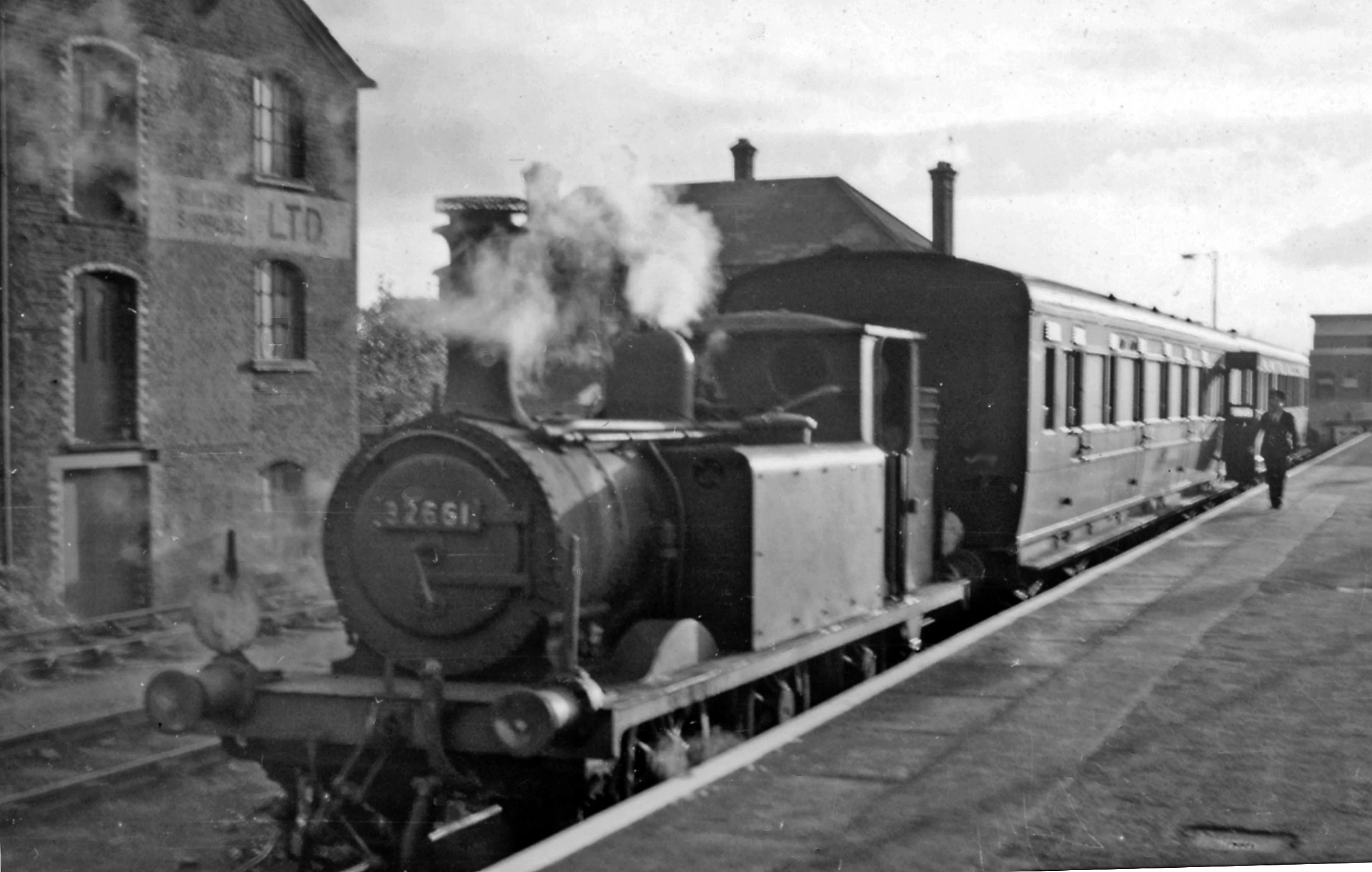
A train bound for Hayling Island (1958)

The first station at Havant was built in 1847 by the London, Brighton & South Coast Railway (LB&SCR) 500 metres (547 yd) to the east, as a small wayside station called Havant Halt. It was demolished after a serious fire. A newer station was then built 200 metres (219 yd) west to serve the then new London & South Western Railway (L&SWR) Portsmouth Direct Line. This station was demolished so that a bigger station could be built 300 metres (328 yd) further west to serve the new Hayling Island branch line. It had three platforms: one for Hayling Island and two for the stopping main line services.

Prior to grouping in 1923, the Battle of Havant took place between the LB&SCR and the L&SWR when the two railway companies fought for the right to use LB&SCR tracks into Havant in order for the L&SWR to reach Portsmouth. (Note: More information can be read in the Havant New article.)

Havant was the terminus for the Hayling Island branch services until late in 1963. Apart from the platform there was a run round loop, a siding serving a warehouse and a water column supplied by a circular metal water tank located near the signal box. In spring 1966, the Hayling Island tracks were removed; the trackbed was later replaced with a car park and a fence on the south side of the platform.

As part of the Waterloo to Portsmouth electrification the station was completely rebuilt in 1938. The number of tracks was increased from two to four: two for stopping trains and the two for non-stop express trains. The northernmost of the two fast tracks was later removed, as was the remaining fast through track in late 2006. After the engineering work of 2007 was finally completed, after a lengthy delay that had lasted from the beginning of the year, the station's two platforms became bi-directional for greater operational flexibility.

=== Former services ===
Until May 2022, Great Western Railway operated limited services between Brighton, Portsmouth Harbour and Bristol Temple Meads that called at Havant.

=== Recent changes ===
A diagram showing the layout changes of Havant station (Note: Level crossings are labelled LC).

Since July 2006, the Hayling Island platform face no longer exists and a new bicycle centre has been built in place of the former platform. Most of the signs within the station were changed and new seats have been installed on the platforms, in line with commitments made in the South Western franchise.

There were proposals to put a third (terminating) platform in the gap, although this would have to be very short and narrow, along with reinstating the Hayling Island platform and even the whole branch. Both of these proposals have now been completely abandoned.

In December 2006, the fast southbound through track was removed. Both the entry and exit from the southbound platform were straightened out to allow a quicker entry and exit speed. New crossovers were put in place to allow bi-directional working on both platforms. (Note: From west to east the new layout will be: new NB->SB crossover, new SB->NB crossover, existing road bridge, platforms, new NB->SB crossover, existing SB->NB crossover, level crossing.) The level crossing was also resurfaced, with new crossing gates installed.

== Facilities ==
The ticket office is open seven days a week, with ticket machines available at all times. There are waiting shelters and passenger information system screens on the platforms. There is a bicycle storage area and a car park with 492 spaces.

== Services ==
Havant is a junction station and provides passengers with an interchange between the West Coastway Line and the Portsmouth Direct Line. Services are operated by two train operating companies; the typical off-peak service in trains per hour (tph) is:

Southern:

- 2 tph to London Victoria, via Horsham (1 semi-fast, 1 stopping)
- 3 tph to Brighton, via Worthing (2 are semi-fast, 1 fast)
- 2 tph to Portsmouth Harbour
- 1 tph to Portsmouth & Southsea
- 2 tph to Southampton Central.

South Western Railway:

- 2 tph to London Waterloo, via Guildford (1 semi-fast, 1 stopping)
- 2 tph to Portsmouth Harbour.

Services are operated using a mixture of rolling stock, including Class 377, Class 444 and Class 450 electric multiple units.

Preceding station	National Rail	Following station
Rowlands Castle	South Western Railway; Portsmouth Direct Line; Stopping Services	Bedhampton
Petersfield	South Western Railway; Portsmouth Direct Line; Fast Services	Fratton
Warblington	Southern; West Coastway line Stopping services	Hilsea
Emsworth	Southern; West Coastway line Stopping services	Bedhampton Limited Service
Chichester	Southern; West Coastway line Fast services	Fratton
Emsworth	Southern; West Coastway line Southampton services	Cosham
	Disused railways	
Terminus	British Rail Southern Region Hayling Island Branch Line	Langston
