= Cosham railway station =

Railway station in Hampshire, England

Coordinates: 50°50′31″N 1°04′03″W

Cosham
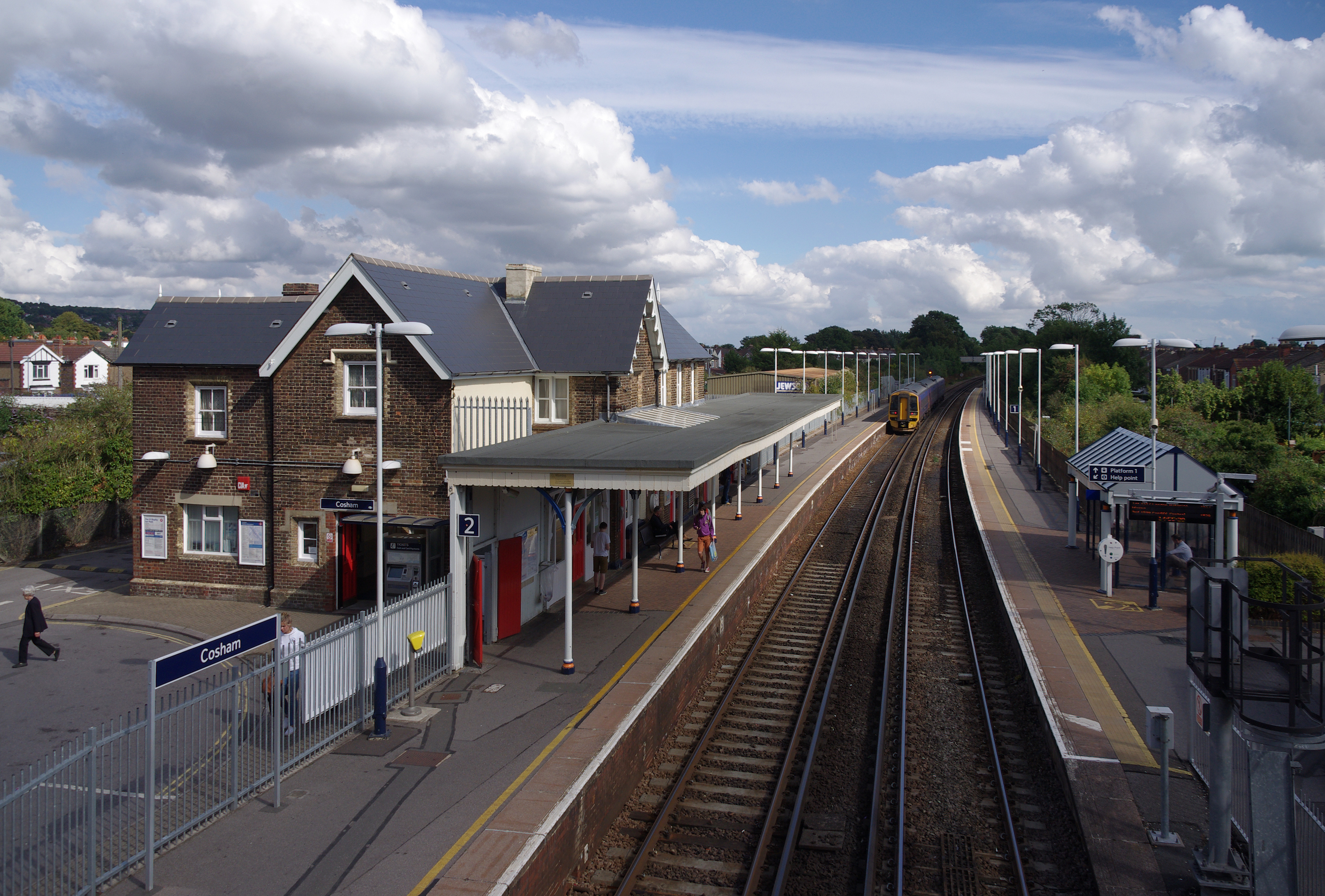
- View of the station in 2013

General information
- Location: Cosham, Portsmouth; England
- Grid reference: SU657051
- Managed by: South Western Railway
- Platforms: 2

Other information
- Station code: CSA
- Classification: DfT category D

History
- Opened: 1 October 1848
- Original company: London and South Western Railway
- Pre-grouping: Portsmouth and Ryde Joint Railway
- Post-grouping: Southern Railway

Passengers
- 2020/21: ▼0.263 million
- 2021/22: ▲0.662 million
- 2022/23: ▲0.765 million
- 2023/24: ▲0.812 million
- 2024/25: ▲0.896 million
Location
Notes
- Passenger statistics from the Office of Rail and Road

Cosham railway station serves Cosham, a northern suburb of the city of Portsmouth, Hampshire, in southern England. It is 90 miles 6 chains (90.08 miles, 144.96 km) from London Waterloo.

Opened in 1848 by the London and South Western Railway (LSWR), it is located on the West Coastway Line which runs between Brighton and Southampton. It is currently served by the South Western Railway, Southern, and Great Western Railway train operating companies.

The station used to have a small goods yard which served local freight trains around Portsmouth. Today all that remains is an old loading gauge, with the original site being built upon.

== Services ==
Services at Cosham are operated by Southern, South Western Railway and Great Western Railway using Class 377, 444 and 450 EMUs and Class 158, Class 165 and 166 DMUs.

Great Western Railway services between Cardiff and Portsmouth pass through without stopping after 8pm.

The typical off-peak service in trains per hour is:

- 1 tph to London Waterloo via Basingstoke
- 2 tph to Brighton via Worthing
- 3 tph to Southampton Central
- 1 tph to Cardiff Central via Bristol Temple Meads
- 3 tph to Portsmouth & Southsea of which 2 continue to Portsmouth Harbour

The station is also served by a single daily service from London Waterloo to Southampton Central via Guildford, which runs directly to Cosham from Bedhampton.

Westward, the line through Cosham leads to Portchester and Fareham, eastward to a junction (part of the local "Railway Triangle") between lines leading south to Hilsea and Portsmouth and east to Bedhampton and Havant.

Preceding station	National Rail	Following station
Portchester or Fareham	Southern; West Coastway Line	Havant
Portchester	South Western Railway; West Coastway Line	Hilsea
Portchester	South Western Railway: Portsmouth Direct Line; Limited Service	Bedhampton
Portchester or Fareham	Great Western Railway: West Coastway Line; Not Evenings	Fratton

== Gallery ==
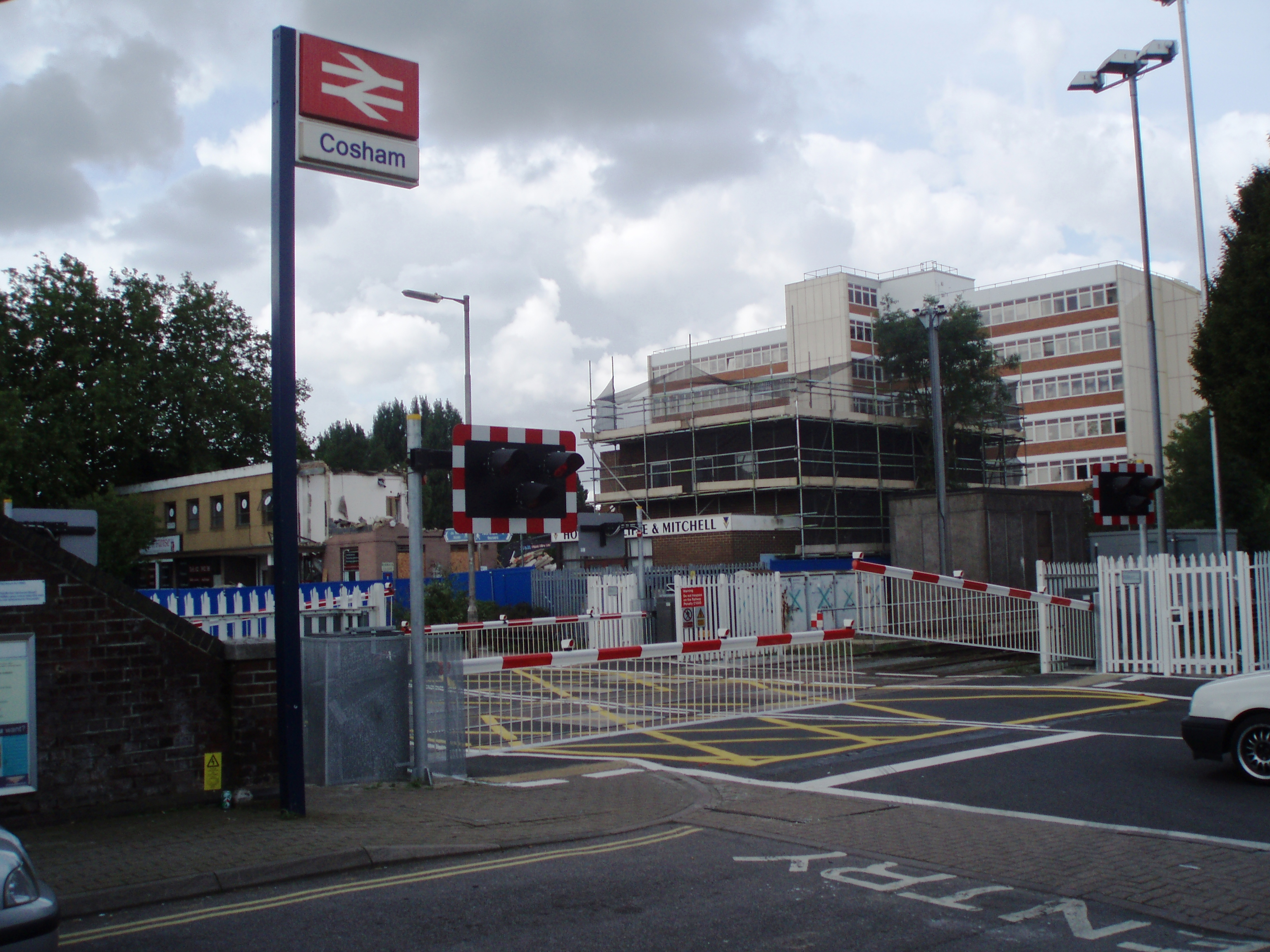
The crossing gates descend

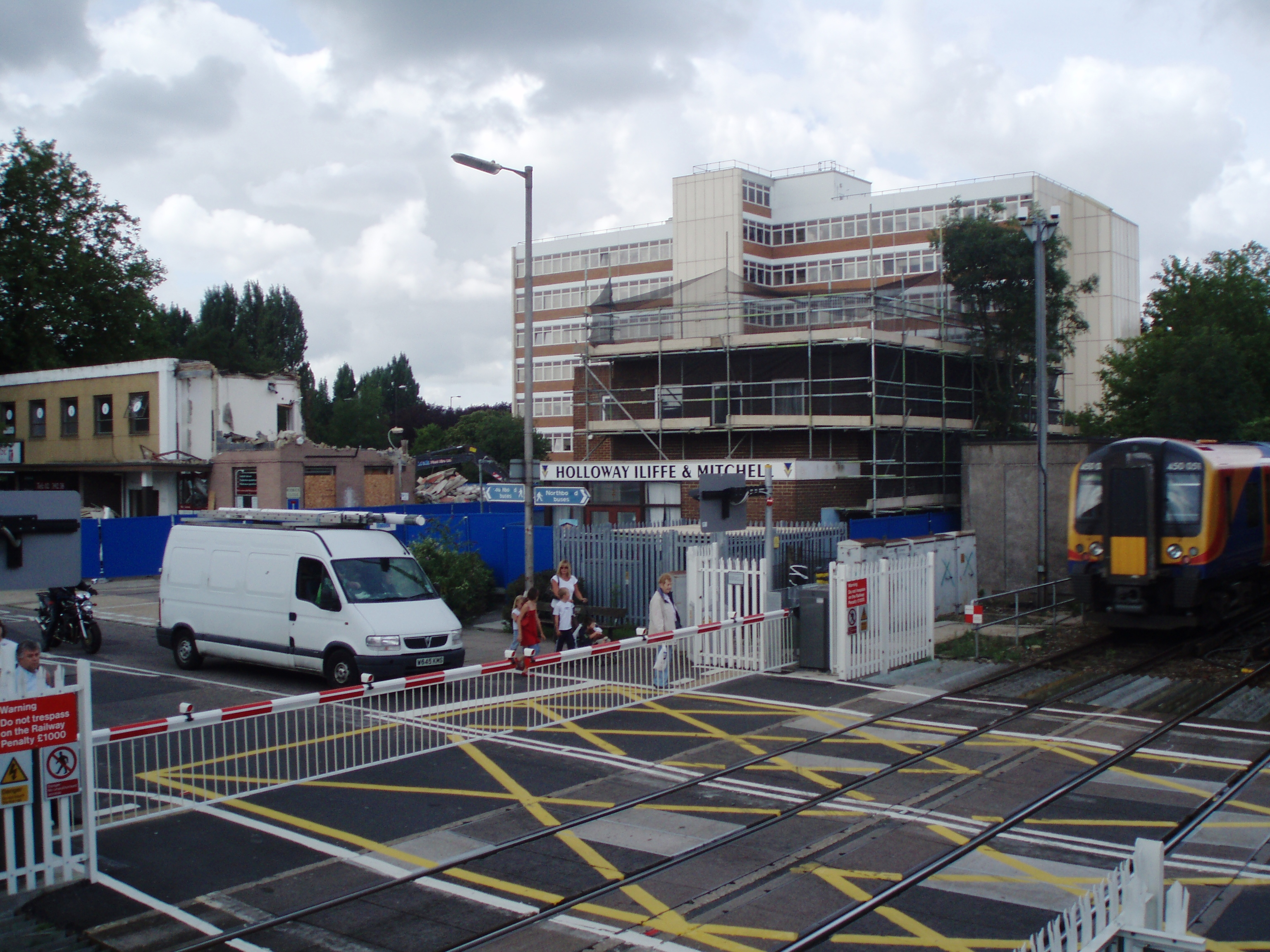
British Rail Class 450 approaching Cosham railway station while motorists and pedestrians wait

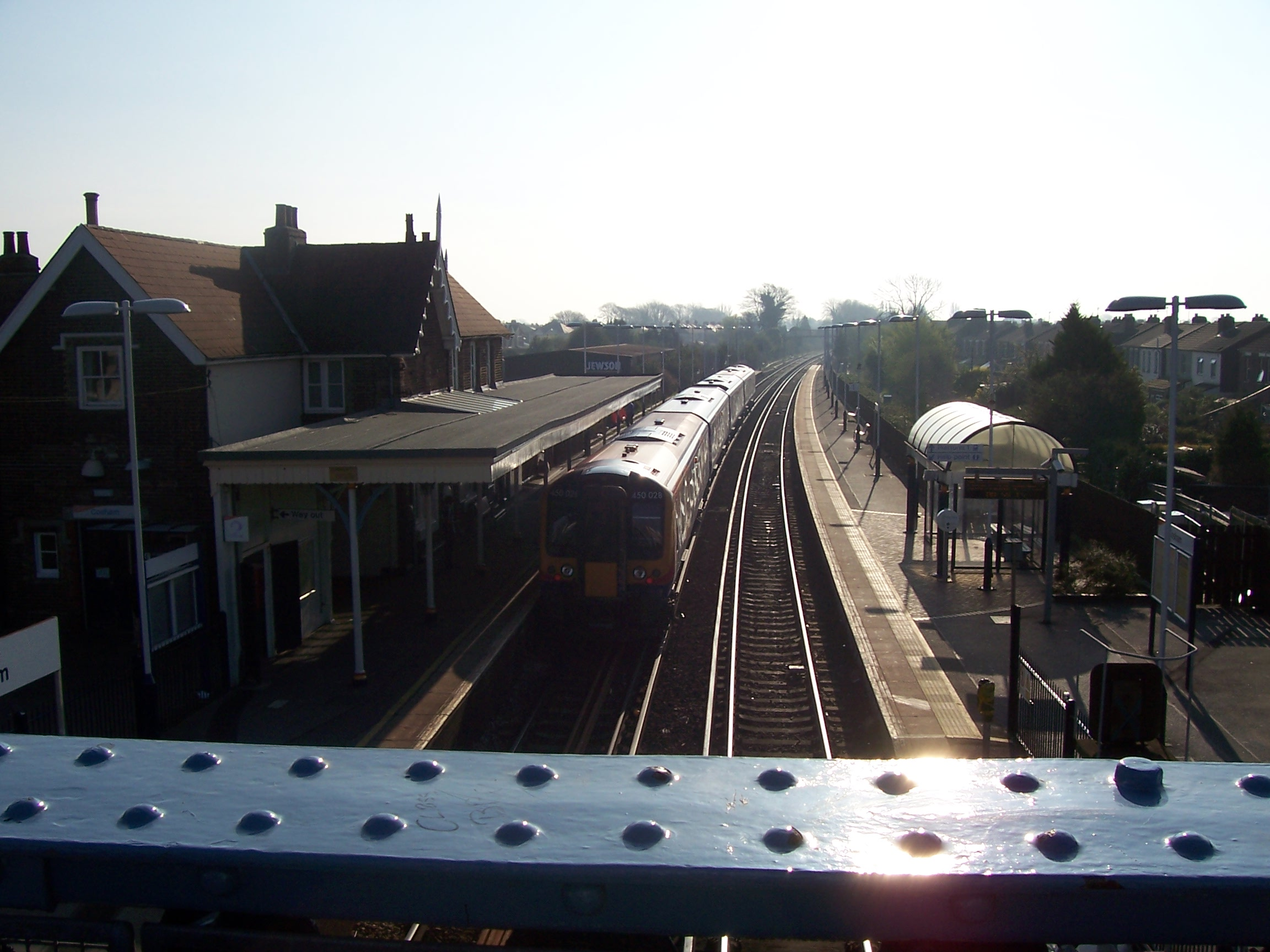
Looking east from the High Street footbridge

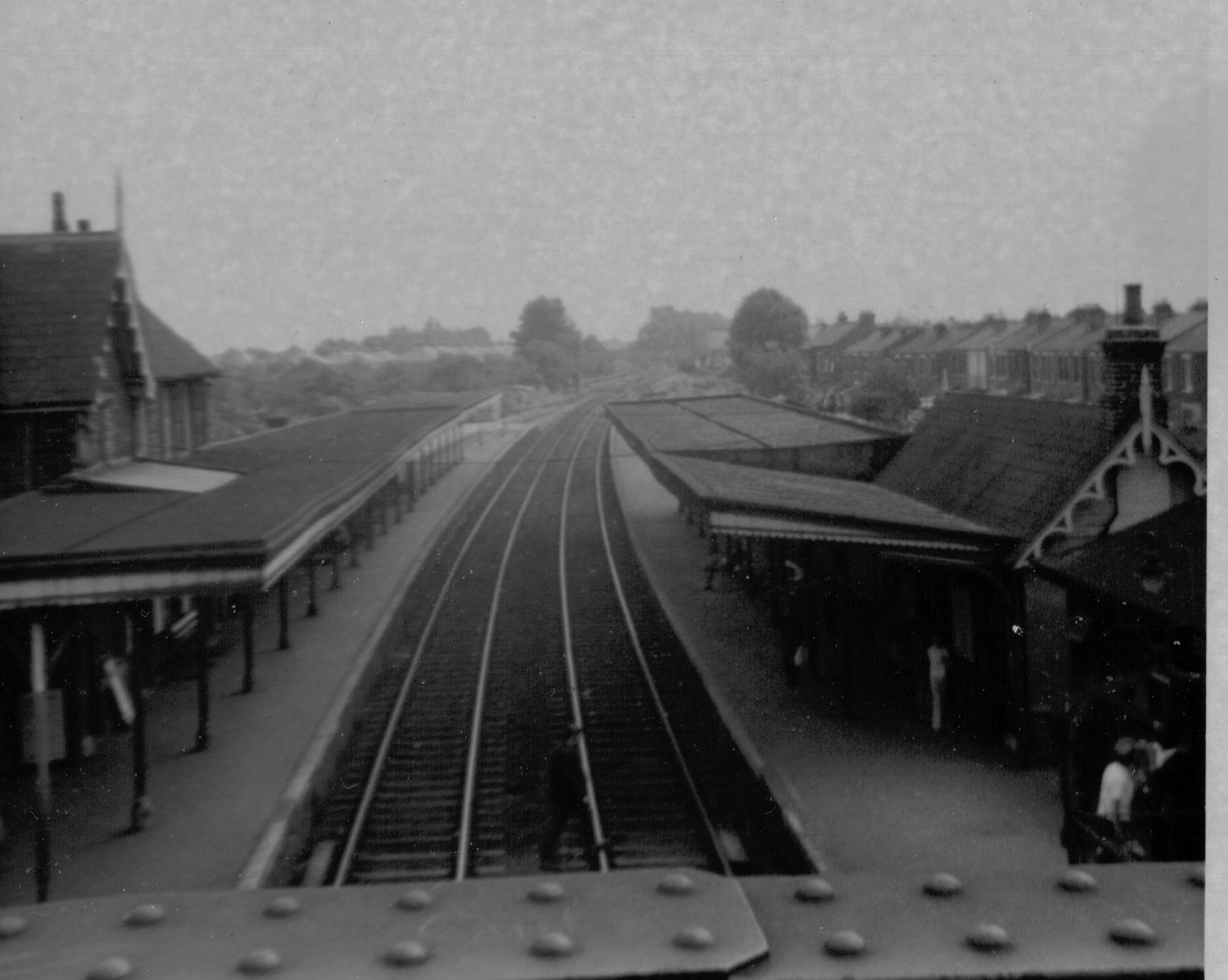
Cosham Station in August 1969.
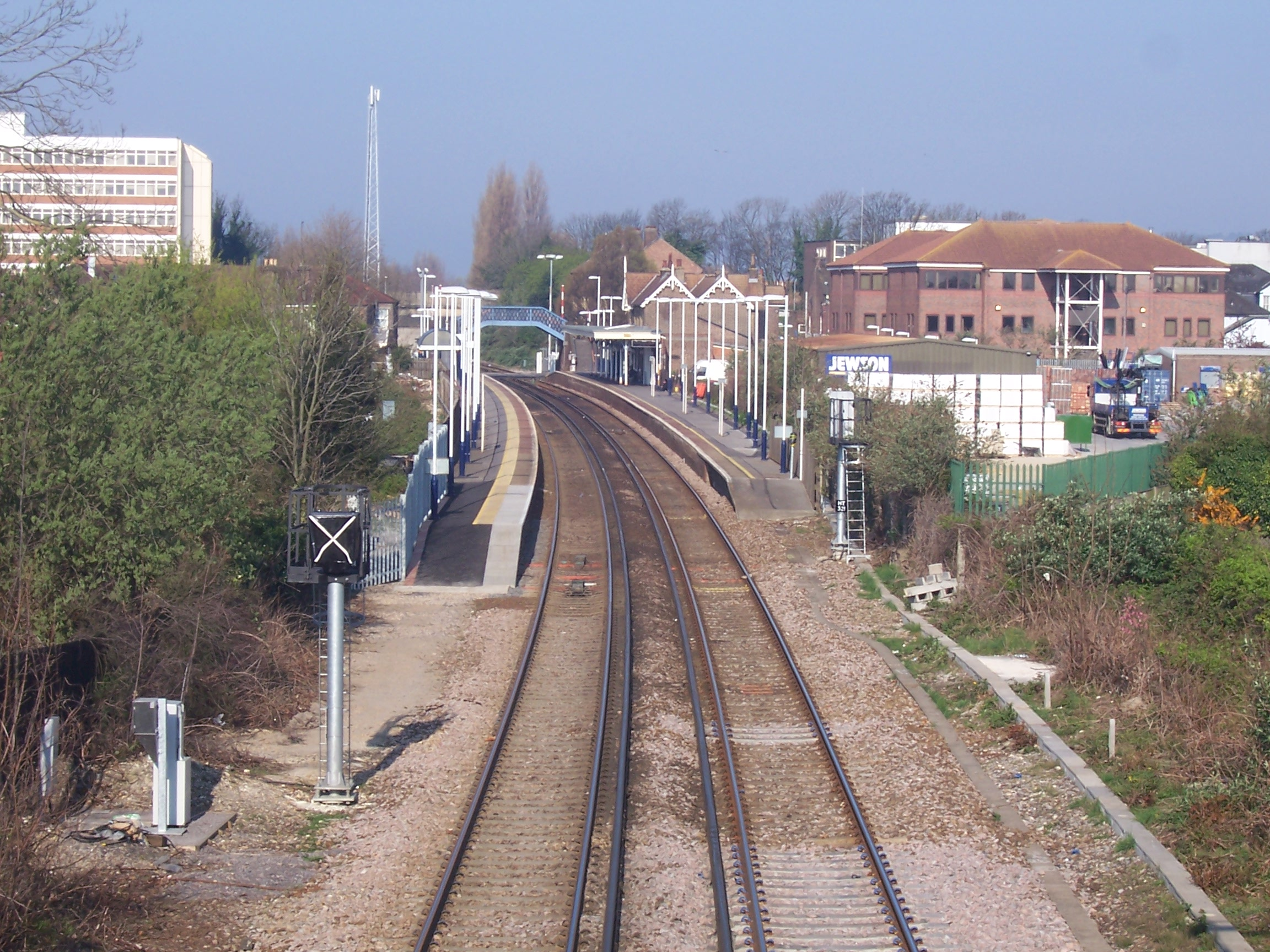
The view from the Knowlsey Road footbridge

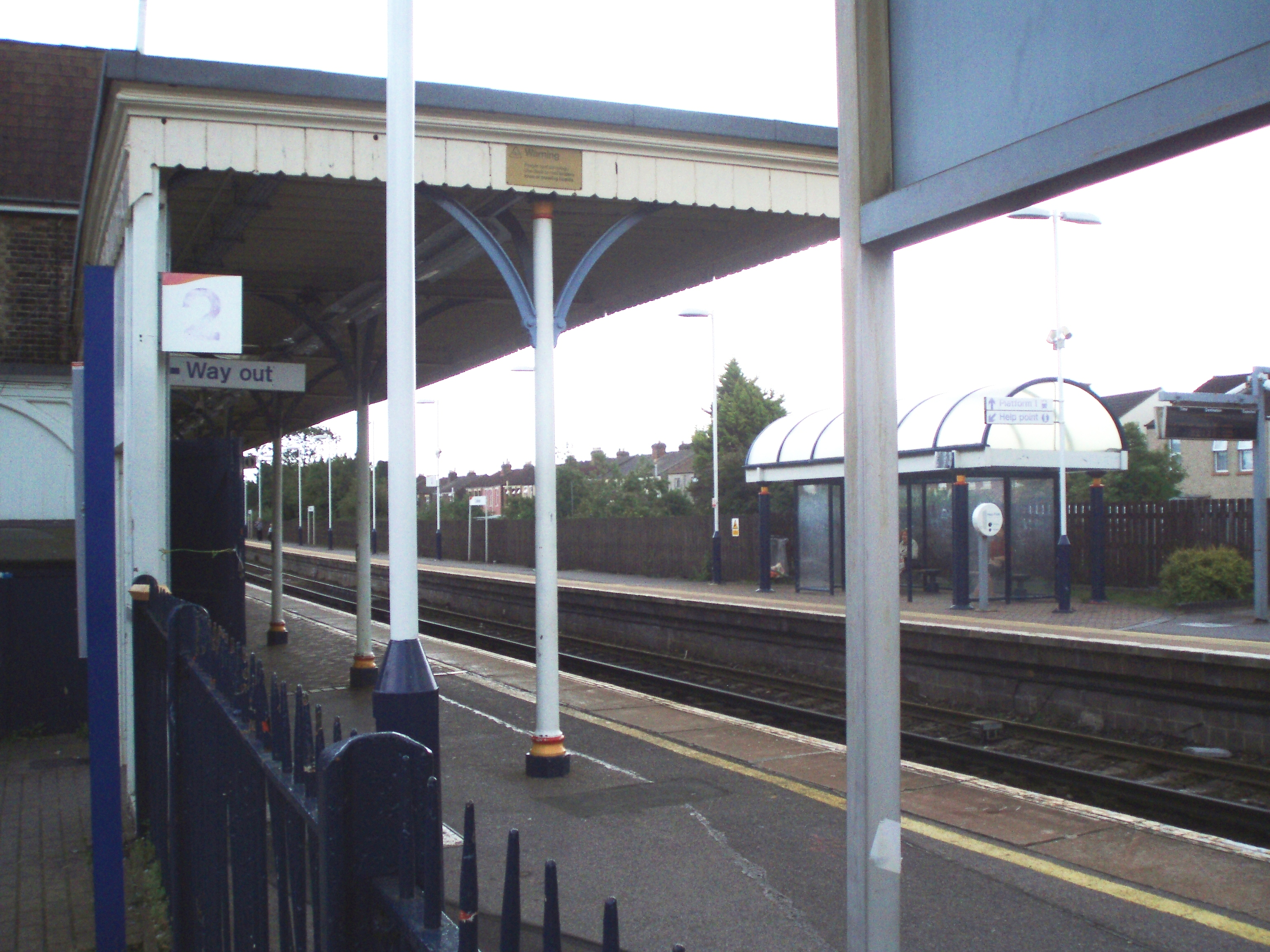
Looking from the down towards the up platform

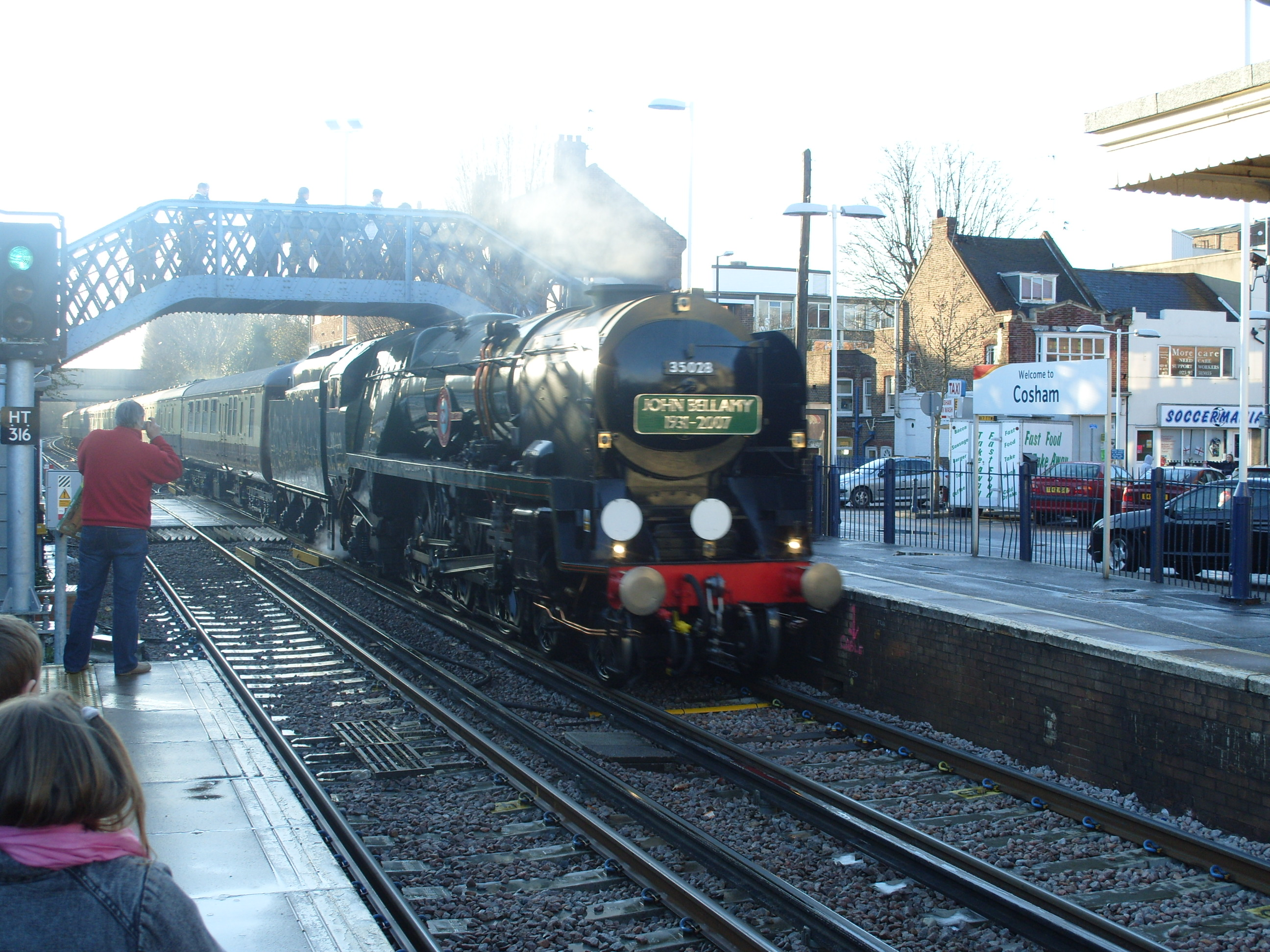
SR Merchant Navy Class 35028 Clan Line passing through Cosham railway station

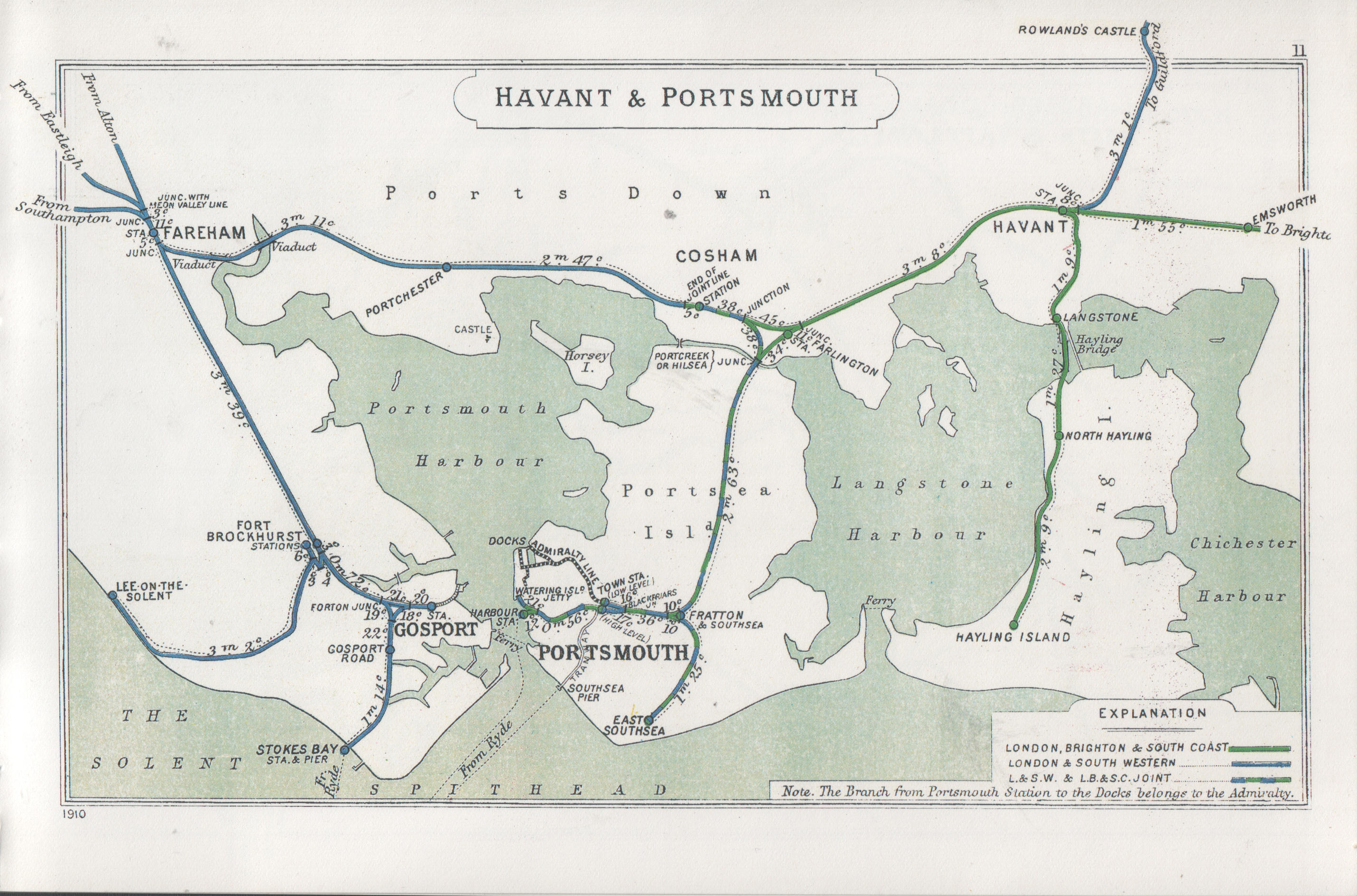
A 1910 Railway Clearing House map of lines around Cosham railway station
