= Portchester railway station =

Railway station in Hampshire, England

Coordinates: 50°50′56″N 1°07′30″W

Portchester
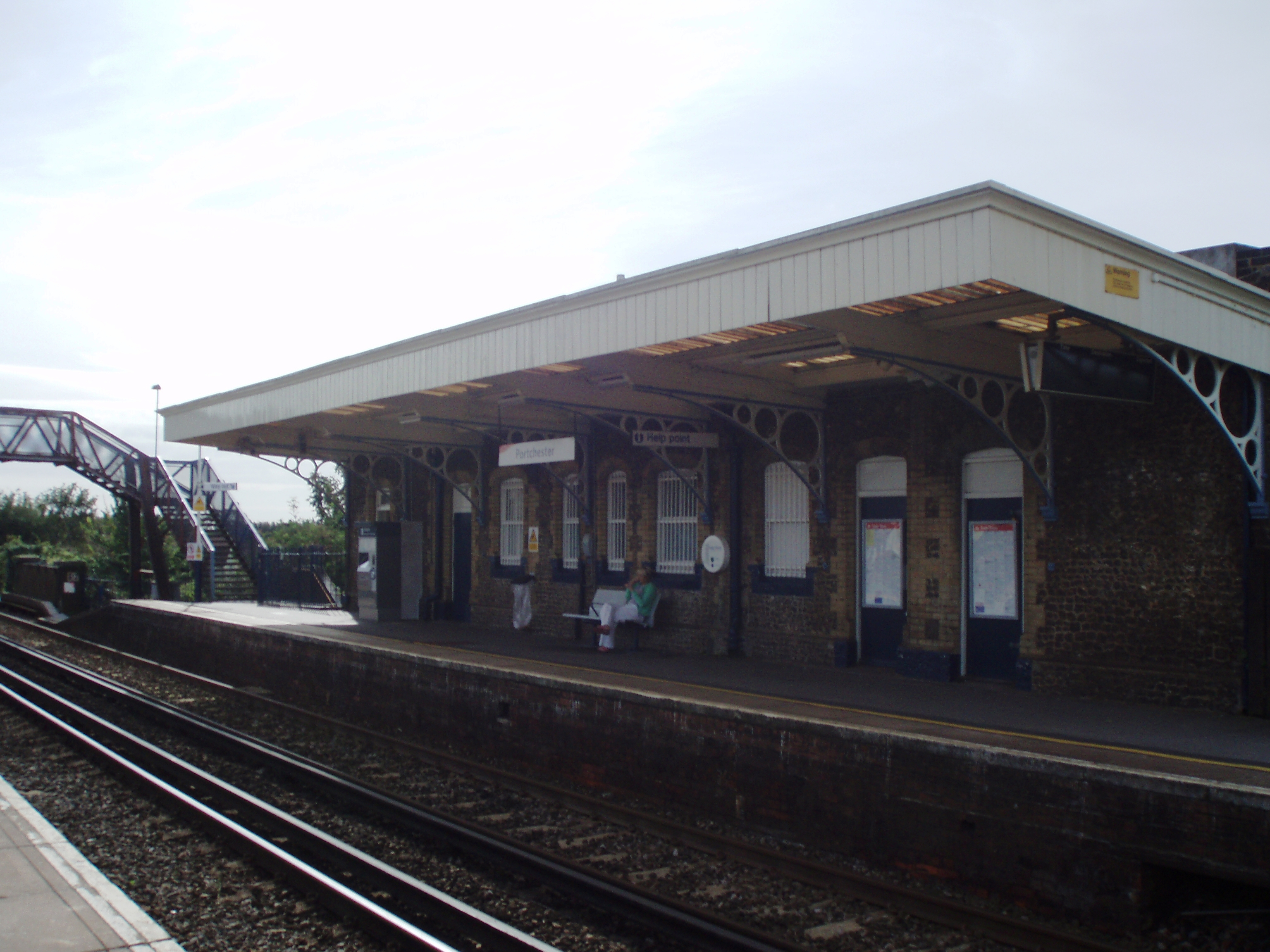

General information
- Location: Portchester, Fareham; England
- Grid reference: SU617058
- Managed by: South Western Railway
- Platforms: 2

Other information
- Station code: PTC
- Classification: DfT category E

History
- Opened: 1 October 1848
- Original company: London and South Western Railway
- Pre-grouping: London and South Western Railway
- Post-grouping: Southern Railway

Passengers
- 2020/21: ▼98,202
- 2021/22: ▲0.262 million
- 2022/23: ▲0.296 million
- 2023/24: ▲0.332 million
- 2024/25: ▲0.367 million
Location
Notes
- Passenger statistics from the Office of Rail and Road

Portchester railway station serves the village of Portchester in Hampshire, England, 87 miles 35 chains (87.44 miles, 140.72 km) from London Waterloo. It was first opened by the LSWR in 1848 on their line from Fareham to Portsmouth.

== Services ==
South Western Railway and Southern operate regular services at Portchester using Class 377, 387, 444 and 450 EMUs.

The typical off-peak service in trains per hour is:

- 1 tph to London Waterloo via Basingstoke
- 1 tph to Brighton via Worthing
- 2 tph to Southampton Central
- 2 tph to Portsmouth & Southsea of which 1 continues to Portsmouth Harbour

At peak times, the Southern service between Brighton and Southampton Central increases to 2tph.

Great Western Railway also serve the station with a single early morning service to Gloucester which is operated using Class 165 and 166 DMUs.

On Sundays, the service between Brighton and Southampton Central does not call at Portchester.

Preceding station	National Rail	Following station
Fareham	Southern West Coastway Line	Cosham
Fareham	South Western Railway West Coastway Line	Cosham
Fareham	Great Western Railway West Coastway Line Limited Service	Cosham

== Gallery ==
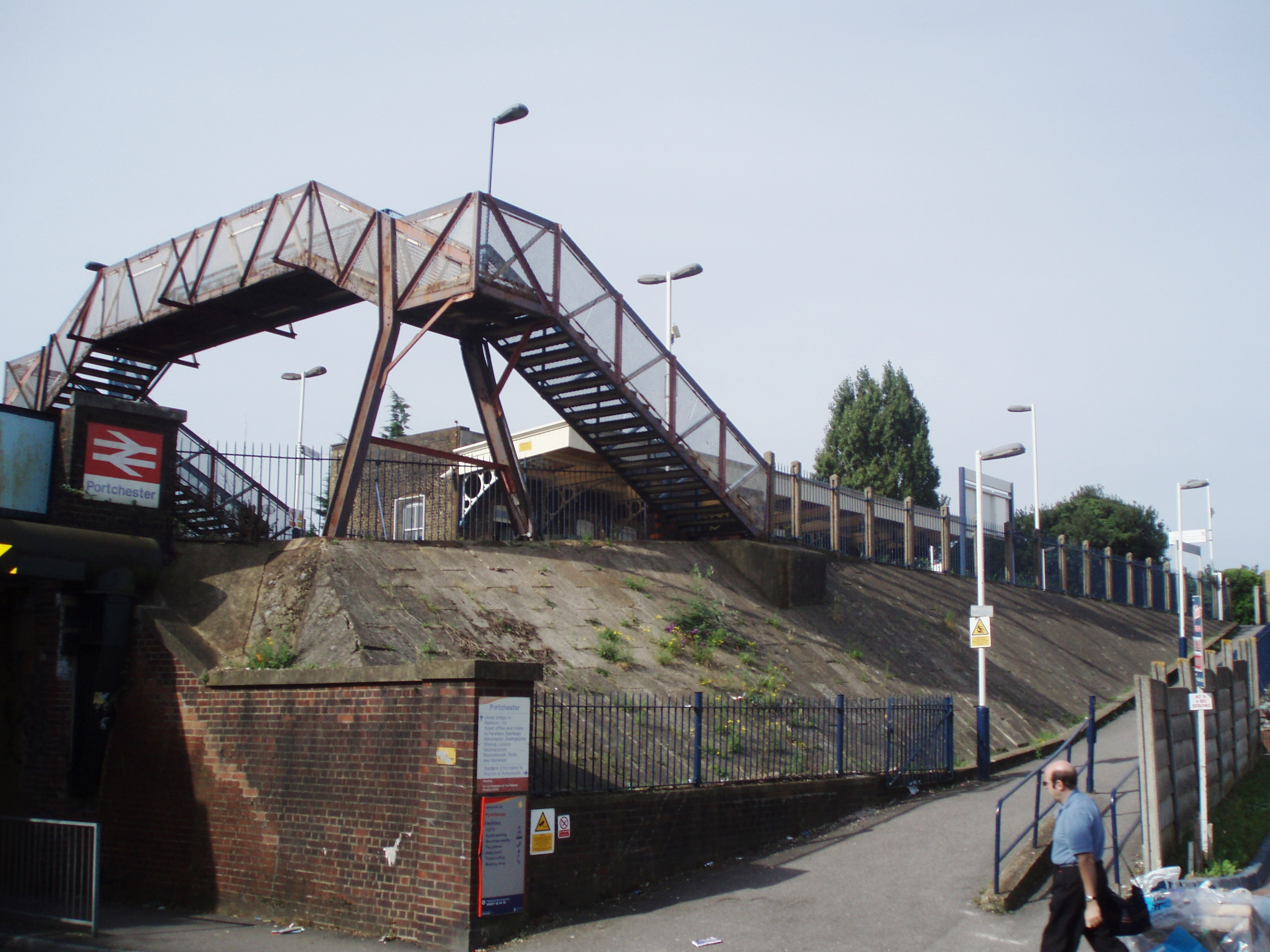
Entrance to Platform 2 (towards Portsmouth)

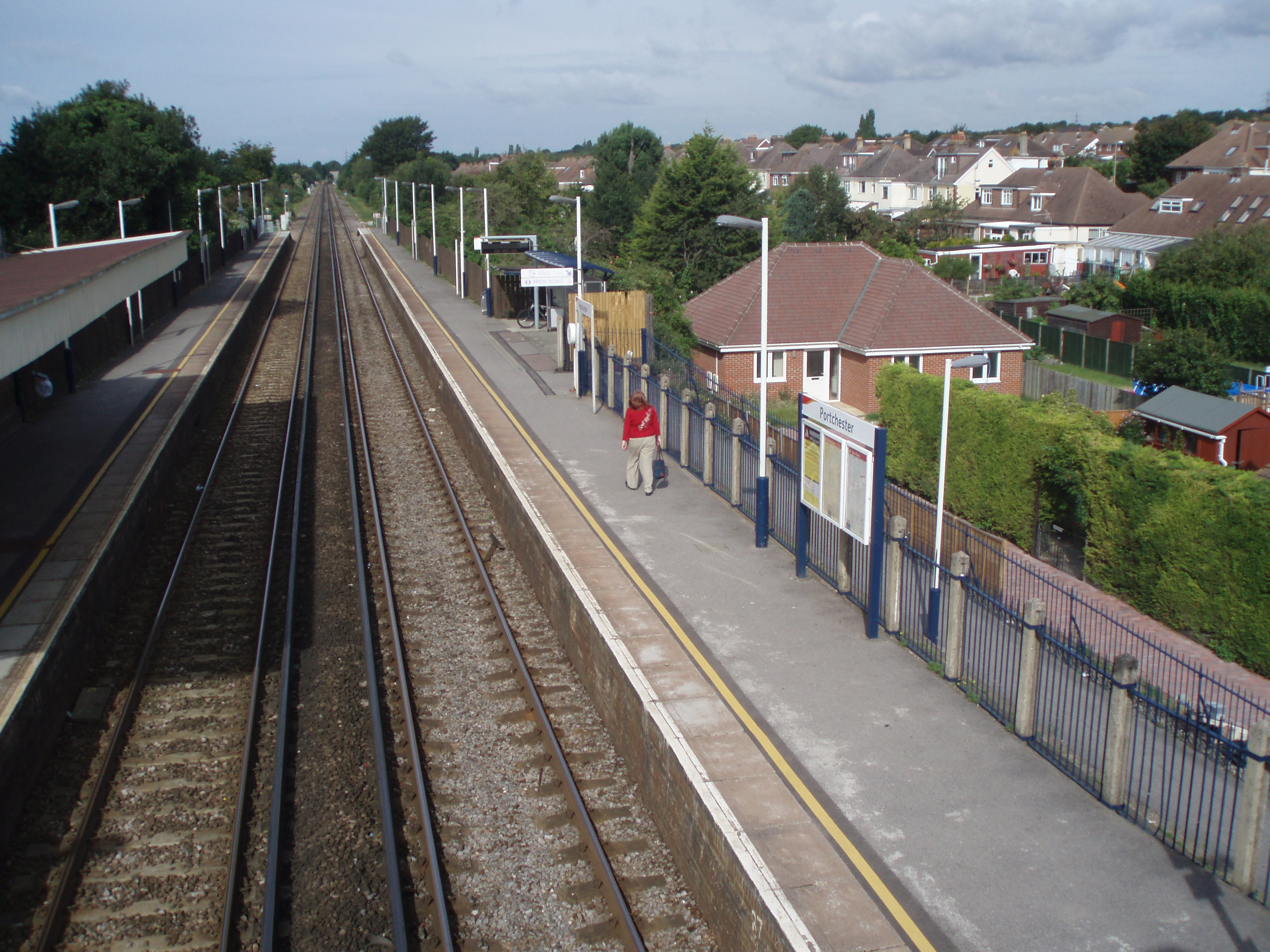
Down platform from footbridge

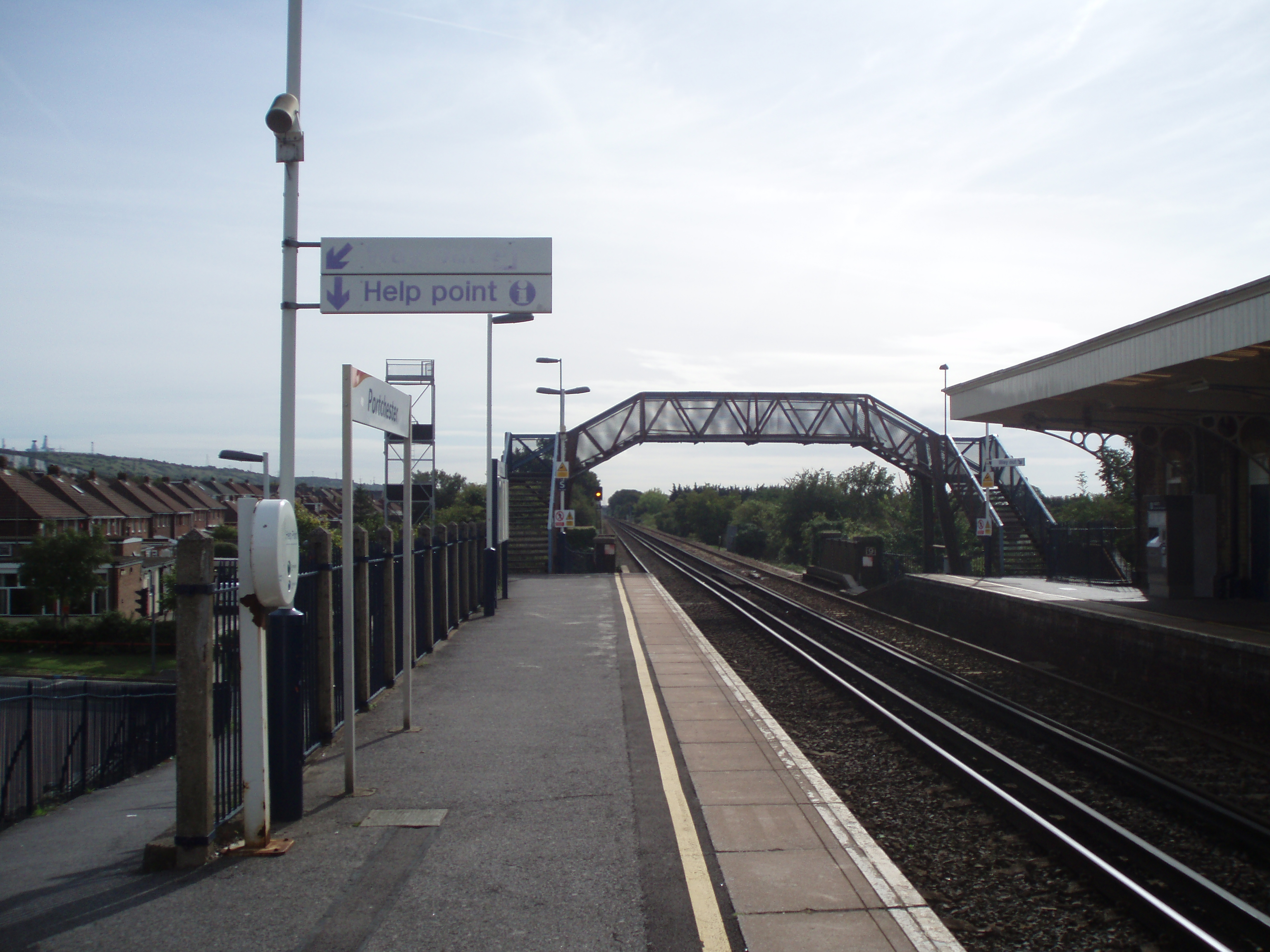
Looking east

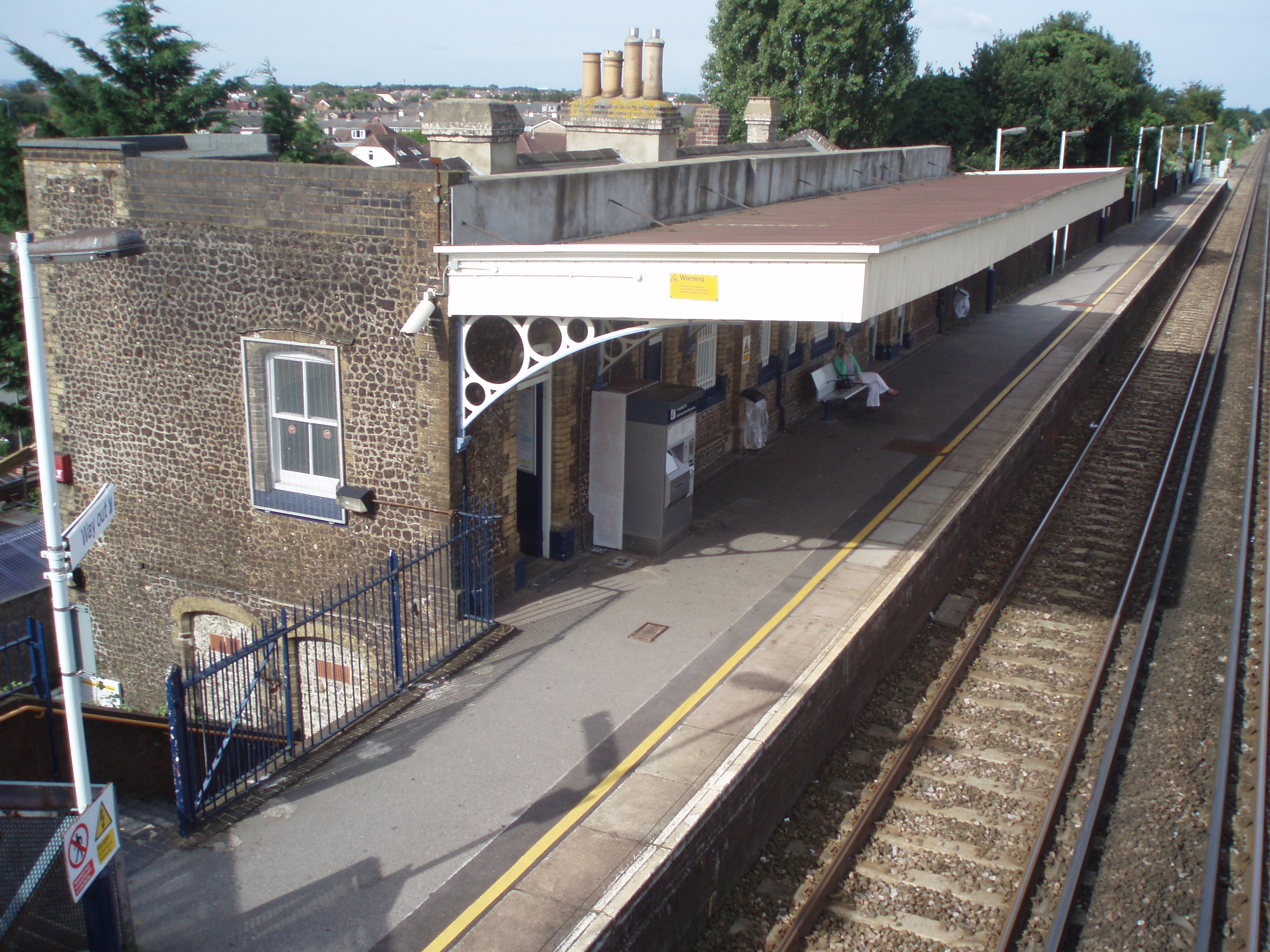
From foot bridge

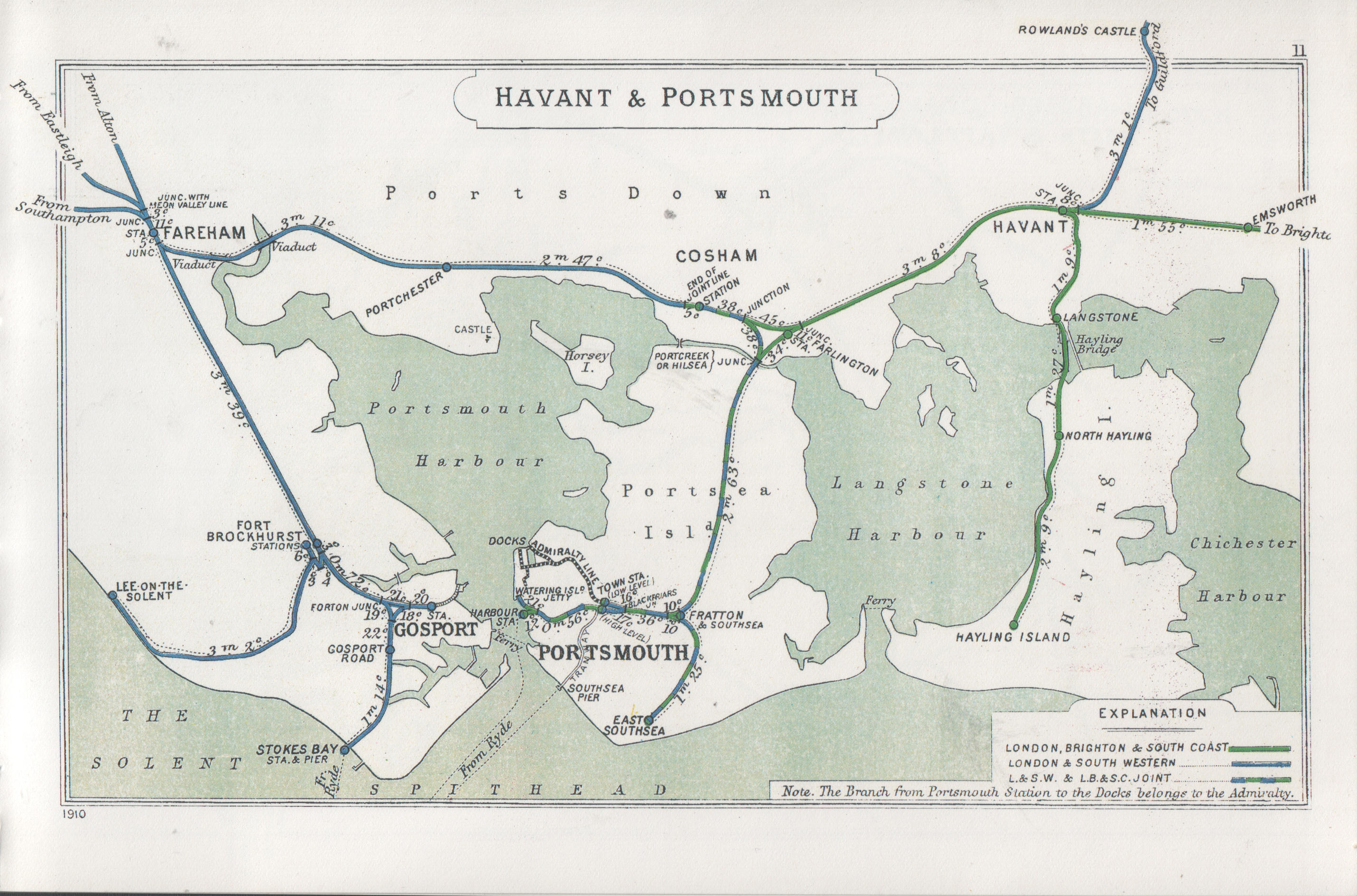
A 1910 Railway Clearing House map of lines around Portchester railway station
