= All Saints Church, Roffey =

All Saints Church
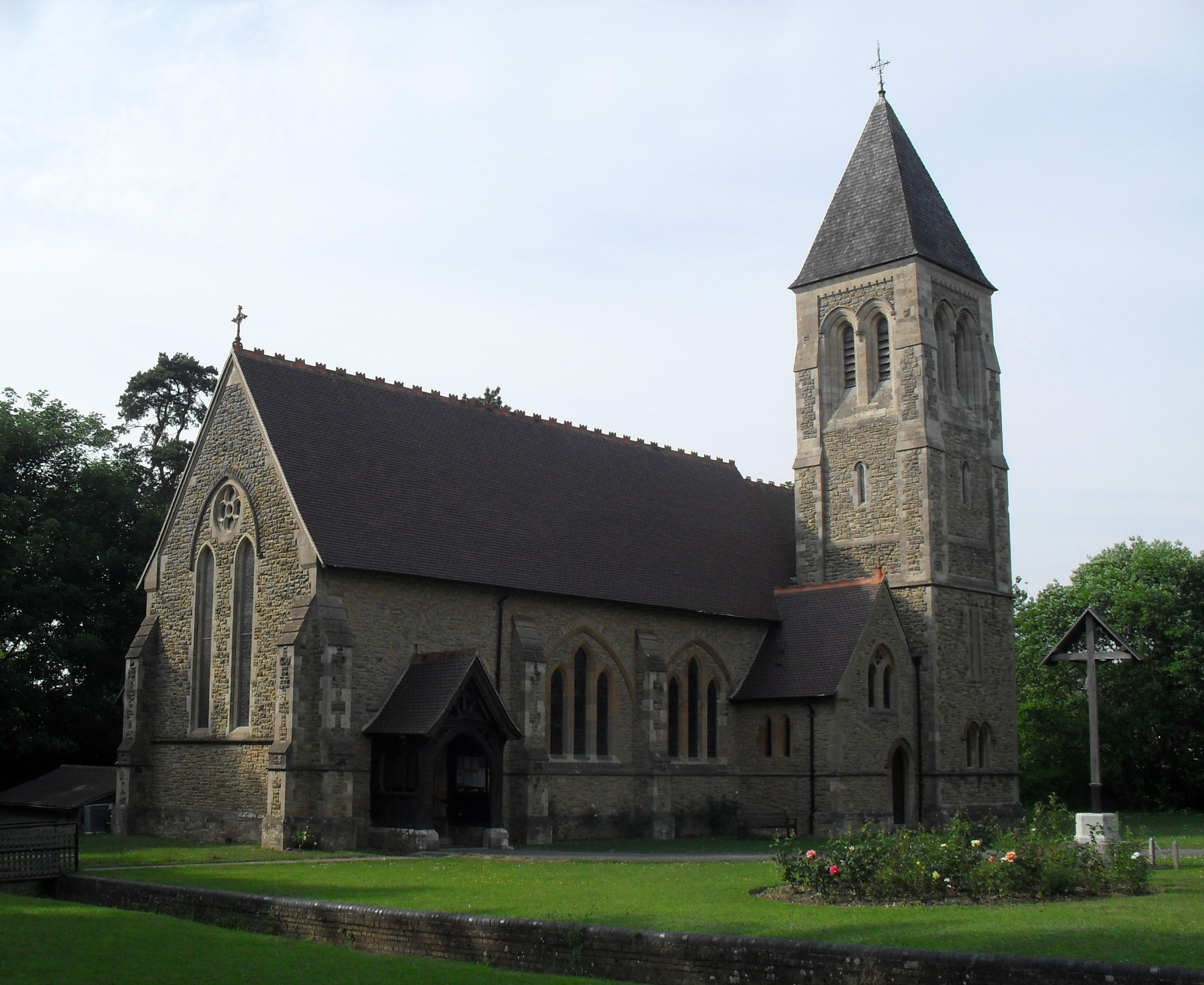
- The church from the southeast
- All Saints Church
- 51.0767°N 0.2940°W
- Location: Crawley Road, Roffey, Horsham, West Sussex RH12 4LX
- Country: England
- Denomination: Church of England

History
- Status: Active
- Founded: 1856 (in schoolroom); 1878 (present church)
- Founder: Gertrude Martyn
- Dedication: All Saints
- Consecrated: 1878

Architecture
- Functional status: Parish church
- Heritage designation: Grade II
- Designated: 11 November 2002
- Architect: Arthur Blomfield
- Style: Early English Gothic Revival
- Completed: 1878
- Construction cost: £4,000–£5,000

Specifications
- Capacity: 300
- Materials: Horsham sandstone; Bath stone

Administration
- Archdeaconry: Horsham
- Deanery: Horsham
- Parish: All Saints Roughey or Roffey

Clergy
- Vicar: Fr Russell Stagg ssc

All Saints Church is the Anglican parish church of Roffey, in the Horsham district of the English county of West Sussex. The present church, built to serve the Victorian suburb of Roffey—part of the ancient market town of Horsham—replaced a schoolroom in which religious services had been held since 1856. Arthur Blomfield's Early English-style church, built of locally quarried sandstone and funded by a widow as a memorial to her late husband, was completed in 1878 and was allocated a parish immediately. Roman Catholic services were also held in the building to serve Roffey's Catholic population, but these ceased in the early 21st century. English Heritage has listed the church at Grade II for its architectural and historical importance.

== History ==
A settlement existed at Roffey by the 16th century, and the area was known for its early ironmaking industry. A manor called Roffey, part of the ancient and larger manor of Chesworth, was first described in the mid-15th century; its land covered an area northeast of the market town of Horsham.

Horsham was linked to the national railway network in 1848, when a branch line was built from Three Bridges on the London–Brighton Main Line. More lines were built to surrounding towns in the next 20 years, stimulating residential and commercial growth. The area around the village of Roffey, which had been common land until enclosure in 1812–13, began to develop in the 1820s after the road from Horsham to Crawley was turnpiked. Growth was focused on the old Star Inn, and the village had the alternative name Star Row until as late as 1874 (as well as variations on its original name—such as Roughey, Roughheath and Roughway— which was derived from the Old English Rogh hay meaning "deer enclosure").

The village was in the ecclesiastical parish of Horsham, whose parish church (St Mary's Church) was distant. The possibility of opening a church in Roffey was first discussed in about 1840. In 1856, an iron school was erected on Roffey Street, and this building almost immediately became the village's first church when it was licensed as a 90-capacity place of worship. Consideration was soon given to building a permanent church to serve the continuously growing population; and in 1870 Mrs A. Gertrude Martyn, widow of Cecil Martyn from nearby Roffey Lodge, donated money and land for the construction of a church in memory of her late husband. Gothic Revival architect Arthur Blomfield, who designed or restored several churches in Sussex, was commissioned to design the church.

Building work began in 1878 and was finished within the year. Blomfield used locally quarried sandstone dressed with Bath stone. During construction, a swan crashed into the scaffolding around the tower while in flight, and fell dead on the ground. Coincidentally, the Martyn family crest featured a swan and a crown, so the incident was seen as auspicious—and the dead swan's feathers were removed and incorporated into the antependium of the altar when the church opened. Building work was complete by 1 November 1878 (All Saints Day), and the church was consecrated by the Bishop of Chichester Richard Durnford. Construction work had cost between £4,000 and £5,000.

Roffey continued to thrive: in 1878, the suburb was described as "growing, populous, but very poor", and by the end of the 19th century a workhouse, working men's club, reading room, larger school and a parade of shops were all built. The workhouse site became a military camp and hospital in 1916, and later a psychiatric hospital. The 300-capacity church was allocated its own parish immediately after opening, and was well-used from the beginning—congregations were typically around 125 in its early years, although some residents of distant parts of the parish worshipped in the nearby villages of Colgate or Rusper. In 1880, the churchyard was consecrated and a J. W. Walker & Sons manual organ was installed in the church. A Calvary—a wooden crucifix of teak and oak—was erected in the churchyard in 1919 as Roffey's war memorial. The Bishop of Chichester Winfrid Burrows dedicated the sculpture on 4 October 1919. In 1971, it had to be rebuilt and rededicated after being knocked over and badly damaged during a tree-felling exercise.

A new vicarage, replacing an earlier building which was too expensive to maintain, was opened in 1967. A parish hall had already been built in 1957. In 1972, All Saints Church began to hold regular Roman Catholic Masses, which continued until 2011 or later.

== Architecture ==
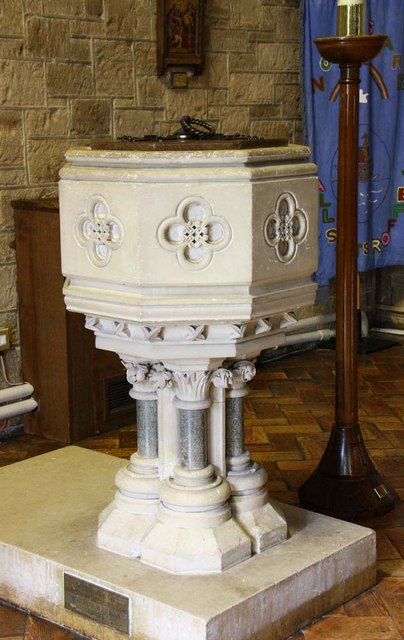
The church has a stone and marble-columned font.

All Saints Church is a small Early English Gothic Revival-style building with a "surprisingly large" tower. It is built of Horsham sandstone, laid as rubble in a snecked formation (courses of stonework with smaller stones, or snecks, inserted at frequent intervals). There is also Bath stone and some brickwork. The roof is laid with tiles, and the tower roof is shingled.

The plan consists of a 3 1/2-bay nave with an aisle on the north side only, a chancel of a further two bays (and at a lower level), and a tower, vestry and porch—all grouped close to each other. The simple building was described as "hard and soulless" by Nikolaus Pevsner, although he noted that its interior was "impressively proportioned". The quadruple-trussed timber hammerbeam roof of the nave, held on carved stone corbels and supported by scissor braces (paired diagonal braces running between pairs of beams), displays Blomfield's characteristic careful regard for the timberwork in his churches.

The west window consists of a pair of lancets below a quatrefoil, and elsewhere in the nave there are three-light lancets set into recessed arches and separated by buttresses. The vestry window is similar to the west window, and sits above an arched doorway. Seven more lancet windows are in the north aisle, and the chancel has a further three sets—including a three-light east window, which contains stained glass designed by the Clayton and Bell firm in 1878. Michael Charles Farrer Bell, later of the same firm, was responsible for the glass in the church's other windows. Scenes depicted include Christ in Majesty, the Four Gospels, the Apostles and various saints.

The porch is timber-framed and has arch braces with elaborately carved spandrels. The adjacent tower rises in four parts to a shingled spire topped with a weather vane. The windows are variously arch-headed and lancet, and the uppermost stage has louvred arched openings.

Interior fittings include a stone and marble-columned font of octagonal design, a stone and timber-panelled carved pulpit, oak choir stalls and Communion rails, timber confessional, a J. W. Walker and Sons organ and a stone, wood and marble reredos with carvings and mosaic work. Cecil Martyn, for whom the church was built as a memorial, is commemorated by a brass tablet on the north side.

== The church today ==
All Saints Church was listed at Grade II by English Heritage on 11 November 2002; this defines it as a "nationally important" building of "special interest". As of February 2001, there were 1,628 Grade II listed buildings, and 1,726 listed buildings of all grades, in the district of Horsham.

The parish covers the whole of Roffey and surrounding areas as far as the Rusper Road and Littlehaven railway station, part of the North Horsham housing estate, and surrounding rural areas towards the villages of Rusper, Colgate and Faygate. The legal name of the parish is "All Saints Roughey or Roffey", reflecting the variable spelling of the area's name.

As well as regular Anglican services, All Saints Church served for many years as a Mass Centre for local Roman Catholics. It was served by priests from St John the Evangelist's Church in the centre of Horsham, and had services on Saturday evenings (a "Vigil Mass", or First Mass of Sunday) and on Holy Days of Obligation. This ceased at some point between 2011 and 2013.

== See also ==
- List of places of worship in Horsham (district)

== Notes ==
=== Bibliography ===
- Elleray, D. Robert (1981). The Victorian Churches of Sussex. Chichester: Phillimore & Co. Ltd. ISBN 0-85033-378-4.
- Elleray, D. Robert (2004). Sussex Places of Worship. Worthing: Optimus Books. ISBN 0-9533132-7-1.
- Haines, Susan (2005). Horsham – a History. Chichester: Phillimore & Co. Ltd. ISBN 1-86077-332-X.
- Harris, Roland B. (October 2004). Horsham Historic Character Assessment Report. Sussex Extensive Urban Survey (EUS) (1st ed.). East Sussex County Council, West Sussex County Council and Brighton and Hove City Council.
- Hughes, Annabelle (2000). A History of North Horsham Parish – to Celebrate the Millennium. Horsham: North Horsham Parish Council.
- Nairn, Ian; Pevsner, Nikolaus (1965). The Buildings of England: Sussex. Harmondsworth: Penguin Books. ISBN 0-14-071028-0.
- Salter, Mike (2000). The Old Parish Churches of Sussex. Malvern: Folly Publications. ISBN 1-871731-40-2.
- Wales, Tony (1999). The West Sussex Village Book. Newbury: Countryside Books. ISBN 1-85306-581-1.
