= Kilnwood Vale =

Coordinates: 51.097656°N 0.243059°W

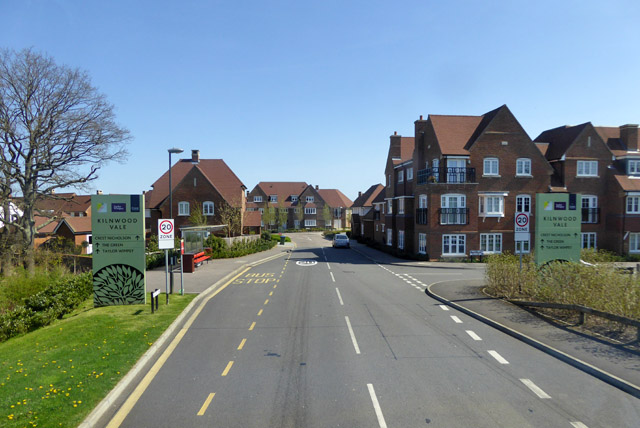
- Entering Kilnwood Vale (2018)

- Location within West Sussex
- Civil parish: Colgate
- District: Horsham
- Shire county: West Sussex
- Region: South East
- Country: England
- Sovereign state: United Kingdom
- Post town: Horsham
- Postcode district: RH12
- Dialling code: 01293
- Police: Sussex
- Fire: West Sussex
- Ambulance: South East Coast
- UK Parliament: Horsham
- Website: Kilnwood Vale Community

Kilnwood Vale is part of the Horsham district of West Sussex, England. It borders the High Weald Area of Outstanding Natural Beauty along the A264 east of Faygate between Horsham and Crawley. The community first opened in 2016 which when complete will include 2500 households. The development is based on the garden village concept designed by Ebenezer Howard, used in Letchworth Garden City, Welwyn Garden City and Hampstead Garden Suburb.

Kilnwood Vale Primary School opened on the development in September 2019 with a planned capacity of 420 pupils. It is a free school and part of the GLF Schools multi academy trust. Cottesmore School is adjacent to Kilnwood Vale alongside Buchan Country Park.

Part of the development has a private gym and social club named The Green and the community is supported by its only sports club, Kilnwood Vale Cricket Club which participates in the Sussex Cricket League. There are multiple play areas for children and walking routes through Pondtail Shaw Woods.

The 10, 23 and 200 Metrobus services connect to Gatwick Airport, Horsham, Crawley and Worthing. The Arun Valley Line runs through the development between London and Portsmouth, the nearest station is Faygate.
