= North Horsham railway station =

Railway station in West Sussex, England

Coordinates: 51°05′09″N 0°17′14″W

North Horsham Parkway

General information
- Location: Horsham, Horsham; England
- Grid reference: TQ201332

History
- Opened: proposed
Location

North Horsham is a proposed railway station in Horsham, West Sussex which would serve the North Horsham Business Park. The proposal was backed by West Sussex County Council who favoured this over Kilnwood Vale.

The station would be located between Faygate and Littlehaven stations.

Preceding station	Future services	Following station
Faygate	Southern; Arun Valley Line	Littlehaven
Faygate	Thameslink; Arun Valley Line	Littlehaven
