= Billingshurst =

Village and parish in West Sussex, England

Coordinates: 51.0226°N 0.4508°W

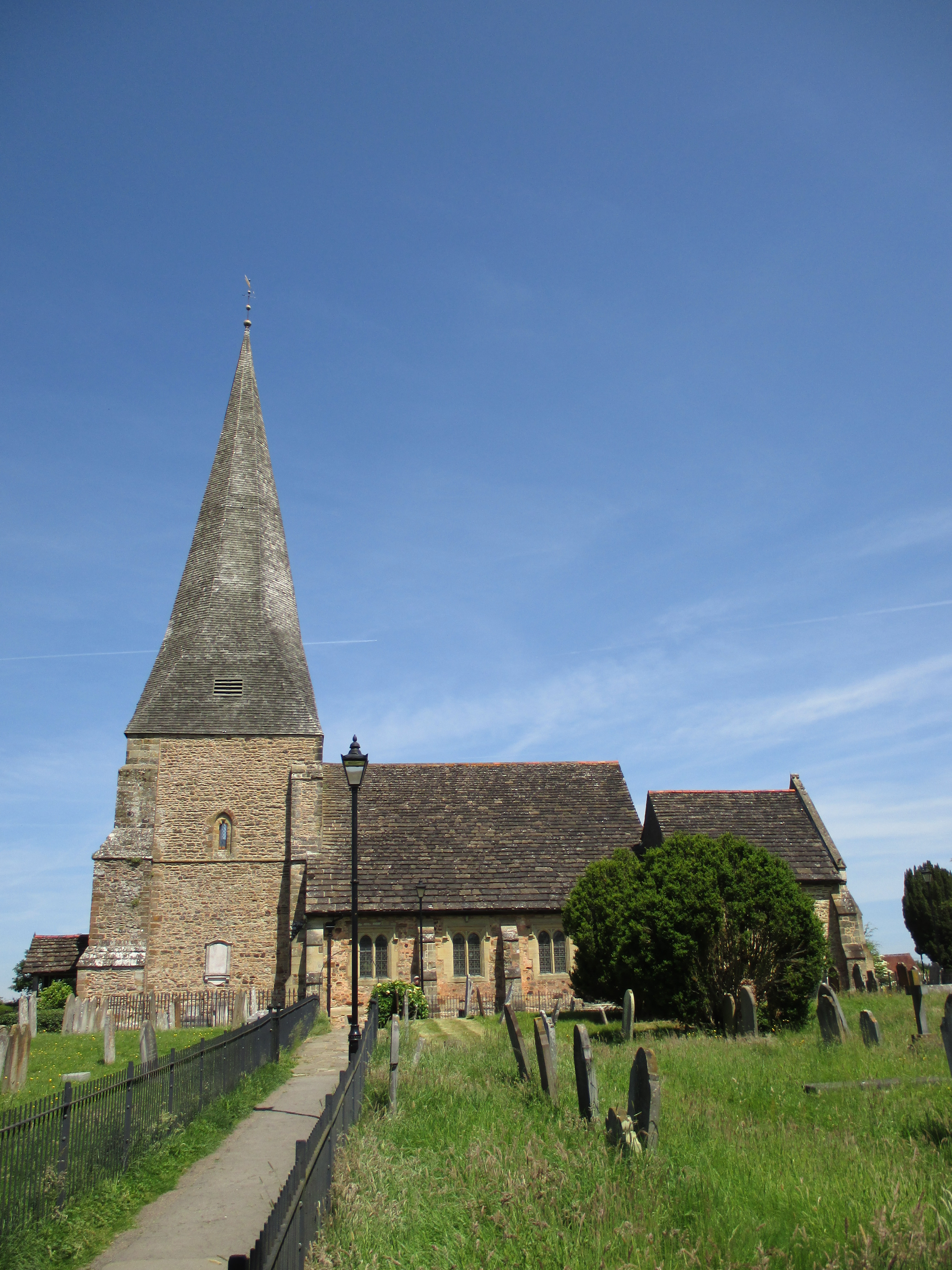
- St Mary's Church viewed from the south in 2018

- Location within West Sussex
- Area: 32.19 km^{2} (12.43 sq mi)
- Population: 8,232 (2011)
  - Density: 256/km^{2} (660/sq mi)
- OS grid reference: TQ087259
  - London: 36 miles (58 km) NNE
- Civil parish: Billingshurst
- District: Horsham
- Shire county: West Sussex
- Region: South East
- Country: England
- Sovereign state: United Kingdom
- Post town: BILLINGSHURST
- Postcode district: RH14
- Dialling code: 01403
- Police: Sussex
- Fire: West Sussex
- Ambulance: South East Coast
- UK Parliament: Horsham
- Website: Billingshurst Parish Council

Billingshurst is a large village and civil parish in the Horsham District of West Sussex, England. The village lies on the A29 road (the Roman Stane Street) at its crossroads with the A272, 6 miles (10 km) south-west of Horsham and 5.5 miles (9 km) north-east of Pulborough.

The civil parish has a land area of 7,952 acres (3,218 hectares) and at the 2001 census had 2,677 households and a population of 6,531 people, which increased to 8,232 at the 2011 census. In the 2021 census, the population grew to 9,127.

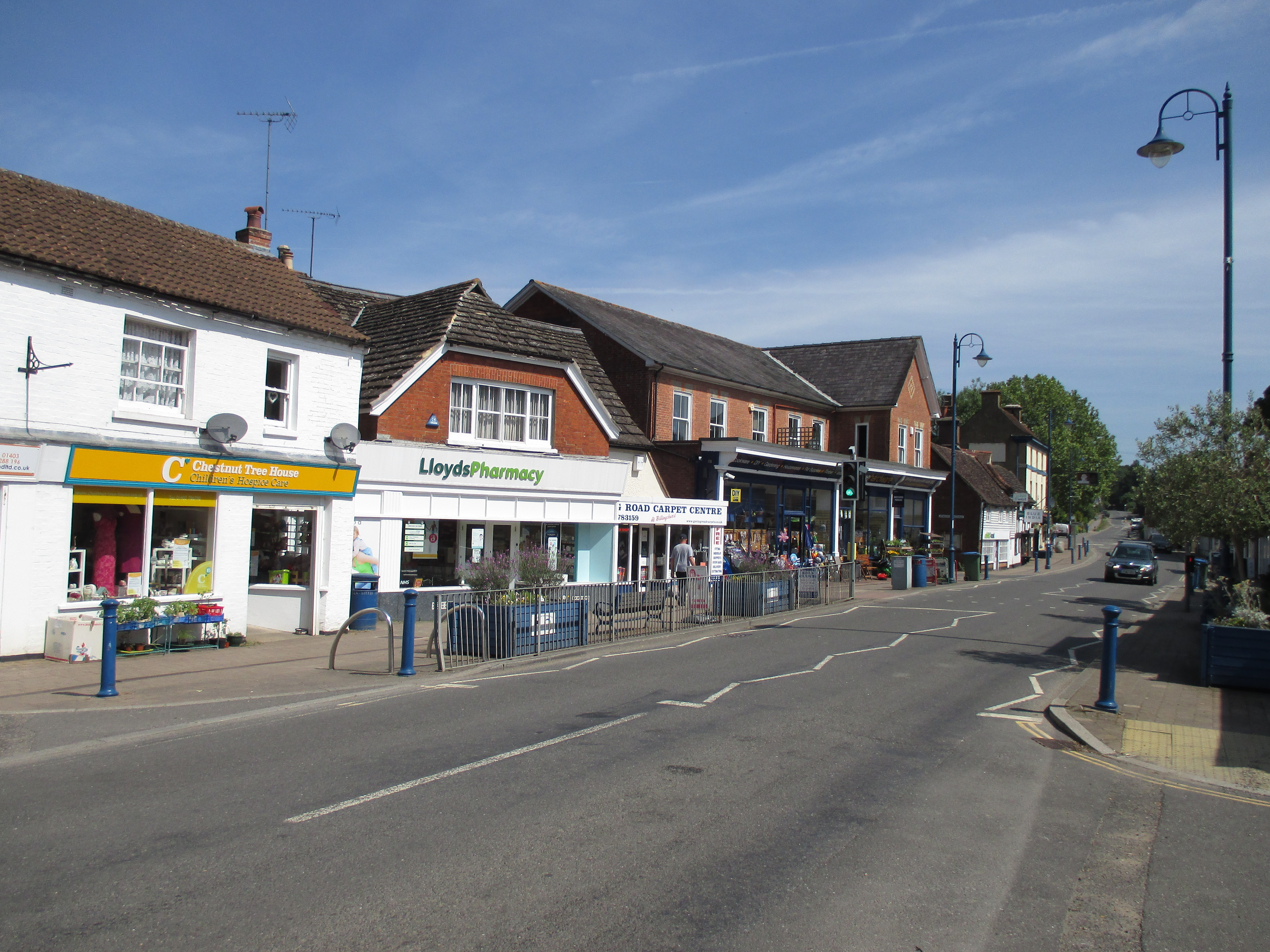
The High Street

== History ==
Billingshurst itself as a settlement extends back to c. 800AD, with evidence of much earlier settlement within the area.

=== Toponymy ===
Billingshurst's name derives from Old English and means 'a wooded hill of Billa's people', most likely referring to the sandstone hillock that Saint Mary's Church is sited on in the historical centre of the village. 'Bill' is the head of a family, 'ing' means of the people, and 'hurst' means wooded hill. It is most likely that it was a small family settlement, not yet being a large community, headed by one 'Billa' – someone of unestablished origin, and not by a populous Saxon tribe.

== Community facilities ==
The village has a secondary school and a sixth form college, known together as The Weald School. Billingshurst Primary Academy School (formerly separate infant and junior schools, amalgamated in 2010, and becoming an Academy in 2023) is situated near The Weald.

The Women's Hall and Gardens founded in 1923 was given as a gift to the women of Billingshurst by Ellen and Edith Beck.

In April 2016, plans were approved for a new housing development on the eastern side of the village, to include a spine road linking the A29 road north of the village with the A272 road to the east. 550 new homes were approved along with a school, dentists' surgery, play areas and improvements to the railway station.

== Transport ==
Billingshurst is at the junction of the A29 and the A272 which are routes to Petworth, Petersfield, Haywards Heath, Pulborough and Bognor Regis.

Billingshurst railway station on Station Road is on the line from London Victoria to Bognor Regis (Arun valley line) between Christ's Hospital railway station and Pulborough railway station. A half hourly southern service in each direction (London Victoria to Bognor Regis railway station) Monday to Saturday. Hourly on Sundays. Billingshurst signal box, one of the last surviving, was moved to Amberley working museum in 2014.

The 100 Bus service (Horsham bus station to Burgess Hill church) serves the village with bus stops at Natts Lane, Station Road and the High Street. The southbound Burgess Hill service runs via places such as Pulborough and Storrington.

The village is to the east of a remaining section of the Wey and Arun Canal; the canal has not been fully navigable since the 1890s.

== Religious sites ==
Billingshurst has four churches. St Mary's Church (Church of England) is the oldest, with a mix of service styles, ranging from Book of Common Prayer communion services to informal family worship. Other churches are St Gabriel's Church (Catholic), Billingshurst Family Church (Evangelical; part of the Commission family of churches) and Trinity Church (United Reformed). Billingshurst Unitarian Chapel, set back behind the High Street, was founded in 1754 and is one of south-east England's oldest Nonconformist places of worship.

== Sport ==
The local football team is Billingshurst FC based at Jubilee Fields on the western junction of the A29 and A272. The club was established in 1891 and is running senior sides and a youth section with teams running from Under 8's through to U16s.

== Notable people ==
- Edith Beck (1847–1930), suffragette and local philanthropist, lived in Billingshurst
- Ellen Beck (1845–1940), suffragette and local philanthropist, lived in Billingshurst
- Paul Darrow (1941–2019), actor and author, lived in Billingshurst
- Diana Dors (1931–1984), actor, singer, and bombshell, lived in Billingshurst
- Colonel John Downes, MP, (1609–c. 1666), Member of Parliament for Arundel during the Long and Rump Parliaments, Colonel, Auditor of the Duchy of Cornwall, lawyer, and Regicide of Charles I, lived in Billingshurst
- Edward Enfield (1929–2019), television and radio presenter, newspaper journalist, and educational administrator, lived in Billingshurst
- Harry Enfield (1961–), comedian, lived in Billingshurst
- Israel Harding, VC, (1833–1917), gunner in the Royal Navy and recipient of the Victoria Cross, died in Billingshurst
- Edgar Hubert, (1906–1985), abstract painter, born in Billingshurst
- Henry Hylton, de jure 12th Baron Hylton, (1586–1641), English Baron, lived in Billingshurst
- Janet Lees-Price (1943–2012), actress, lived in Billingshurst
- Derrick Somerset Macnutt (1902–1971), crossword compiler and housemaster, lived and died in Billingshurst
- Pom Oliver (1952–), filmmaker and arctic explorer, lived in Billingshurst
- Frank Patterson (1871–1952), illustrator, lived in Billingshurst
- Major-General James Renton, CB, DSO & Bar, OBE, (1898–1972), senior British Army officer who briefly commanded the 7th Armoured Division ('The Desert Rats') during the Second World War, lived in Billingshurst.
- Connor Swindells (1996–), actor, lived in Billingshurst
- James Tilley (1998–), footballer, born and lived in Billingshurst and went to school in Billingshurst at The Weald School

== Film and cultural appearances ==
- Billingshurst's Dell Lane was the location for the BBC sitcom Ever Decreasing Circles starring Richard Briers.
- Michael Lugg (1956) in British Pathé "Boy's Traction Engine"
- Paul Adorian (1965) in British Pathé "Vintage Fire Brigade"
