= Ifield railway station =

Railway station in West Sussex, England

Coordinates: 51.116°N 0.215°W

Ifield
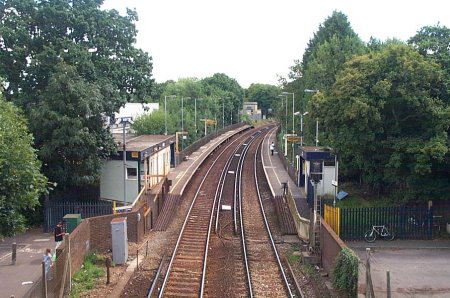

General information
- Location: Ifield, Crawley, West Sussex; England
- Grid reference: TQ250366
- Managed by: Southern
- Platforms: 2

Other information
- Station code: IFI
- Classification: DfT category E

Key dates
- 1 June 1907: Opened (Lyons Crossing Halt)
- 6 July 1907: Renamed (Ifield Halt)
- 1 January 1917: Closed
- 3 May 1920: Reopened
- 6 July 1930: Renamed (Ifield)

Passengers
- 2020/21: ▼87,232
- 2021/22: ▲0.185 million
- 2022/23: ▲0.232 million
- 2023/24: ▼0.231 million
- 2024/25: ▲0.258 million
Location
Notes
- Passenger statistics from the Office of Rail and Road

Ifield railway station (pronounced 'Eye-field') serves the neighbourhoods of Ifield and Gossops Green in the West Sussex town of Crawley, England. It is on the Arun Valley Line, 31 miles 66 chains (51.2 km) down the line from London Bridge, measured via Redhill. Train services are provided by Thameslink and Southern.

== History ==
The station was opened on 1 June 1907 as Lyons Crossing Halt, although it became known as Ifield Halt later that year. It was one of a series of unstaffed intermediate halts set up by the London Brighton and South Coast Railway, to be worked by rail motor trains. It became known simply as Ifield station from 1930.

== Services ==
Off-peak, all services at Ifield are operated by Thameslink using Class 700 EMUs.

The typical off-peak service in trains per hour is:

- 2 tph to Peterborough via Redhill
- 2 tph to Horsham

The station is also served by a limited number of Southern services to London Victoria, Bognor Regis, Portsmouth & Southsea and Southampton Central.

On Sundays, the service is reduced to hourly in each direction and northbound services run to and from Bedford instead of Peterborough.

Preceding station	National Rail	Following station
Crawley	Thameslink Arun Valley Line	Faygate or Littlehaven
Crawley	Southern: Arun Valley Line; Limited Service	Faygate or Littlehaven
