= Crawley railway station =

Railway station in West Sussex, England

Coordinates: 51.112°N 0.187°W

Crawley
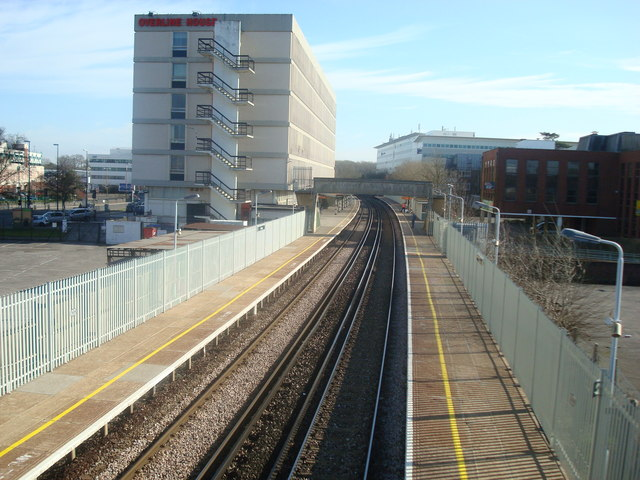
- Crawley Railway Station

General information
- Location: Crawley, Borough of Crawley, West Sussex; England
- Grid reference: TQ270363
- Manager: Southern
- Platforms: 2

Other information
- Station code: CRW
- Classification: DfT category D

Key dates
- 14 February 1848: Opening of original station
- 28 July 1968: Closure of original station and opening of present station to the east
- December 2021: Second station original concourse closed
- 22 November 2022: New concourse opened

Passengers
- 2020/21: ▼0.488 million
- Interchange: ▼954
- 2021/22: ▲1.005 million
- Interchange: ▲2,152
- 2022/23: ▲1.161 million
- Interchange: ▲3,065
- 2023/24: ▲1.287 million
- Interchange: ▼2,246
- 2024/25: ▲1.371 million
- Interchange: ▲2,404
Location
Notes
- Passenger statistics from the Office of Rail and Road

Crawley railway station is a railway station serving the town of Crawley in West Sussex, England. It is 30 mi 49 chains (49.3 km) down the line from London Bridge, measured via Redhill. It is operated by Southern. The station is the last stop on the Arun Valley Line before it joins the Brighton Main Line.

== History ==
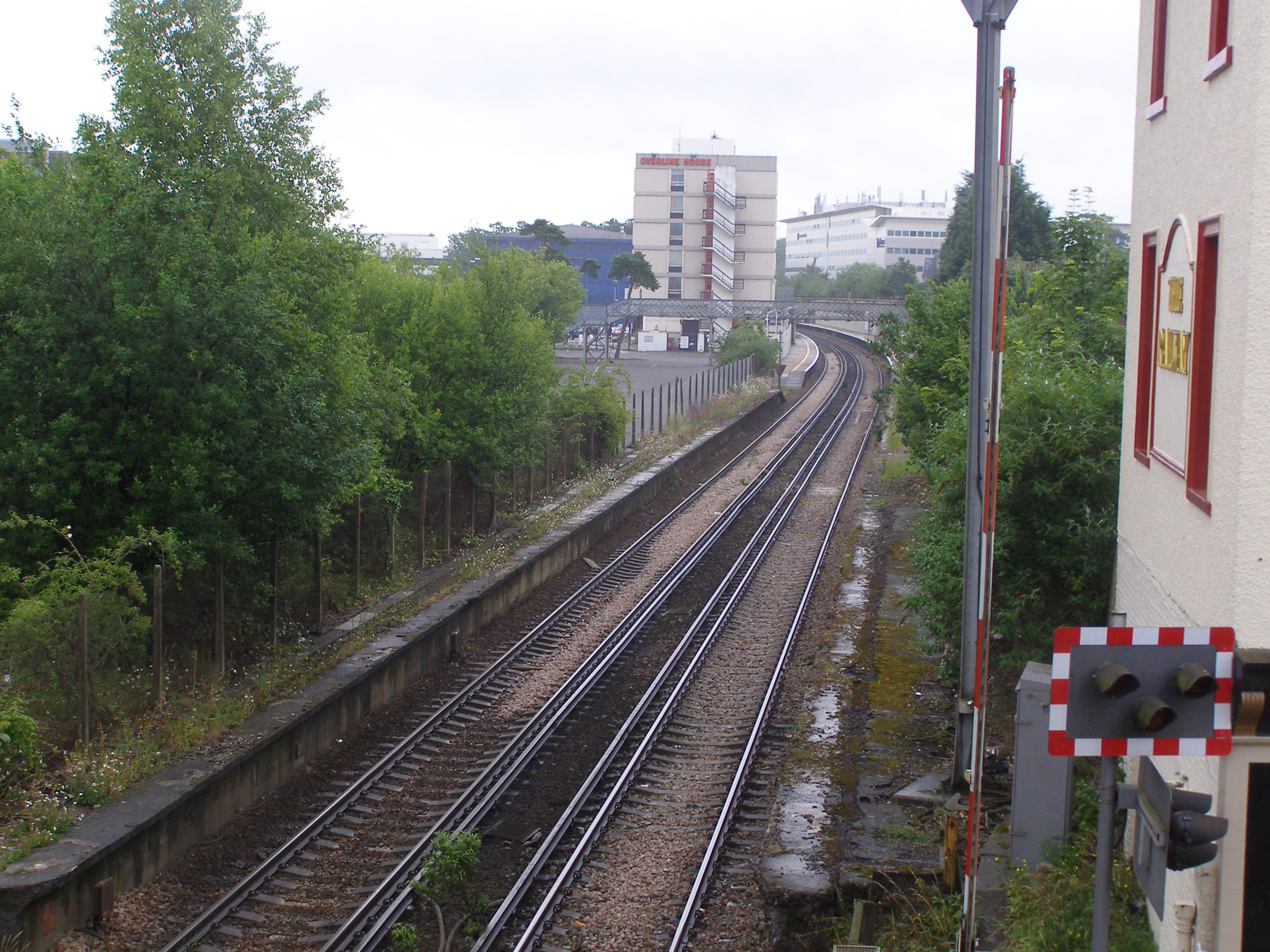
Crawley Station in 2008 showing the original now disused platforms.

The single track branch line of the London Brighton and South Coast Railway between Three Bridges and Horsham was opened on 14 February 1848. Crawley and Faygate were intermediate stations, each with two platforms to enable trains to pass. The line was doubled throughout during 1862 to coincide with the extension of the railway from Horsham to the Arun Valley.

The first Crawley station was situated immediately adjacent to the main High Street, with station buildings on the north side of the railway line.

With the continued development of the New Town during the 1950s and 1960s it soon became clear that the station was too small, and a new station building was opened 28 July 1968 at the current site. The new station was funded by a six-storey commercial development above the new British Rail station. The original station buildings were demolished in August 1968, but the platforms still survive.

A planning application was approved on 16 August 2016 for the demolition and redevelopment of the station buildings to include residential apartments, retail space and multi-storey car parking.

The main concourse and ticket office closed for redevelopment in December 2021. The redevelopment of the main concourse and ticket office was completed in November 2022 and the new concourse opened to the public on 22 November 2022. The new concourse used empty space from sections of the lower floors of the abandoned office block, however the rest of the former office block remains derelict.

In 2020, an accessible footbridge with lifts was installed. It was due to open by autumn 2020.

== Facilities ==
- Concourse
- Ticket office (×2)
- Quick Ticket
- Vending machine
- Waiting room (×2)
- Toilets
- Car park
- Bicycle storage
- Ticket barriers

== Services ==
Services at Crawley are operated by Southern and Thameslink using Class 377 and 700 EMUs.

The typical off-peak service in trains per hour is:

- 2 tph to London Victoria via Gatwick Airport
- 2 tph to Peterborough via Gatwick Airport, Redhill, London Bridge and Stevenage
- 2 tph to Horsham (stopping)
- 2 tph to Portsmouth Harbour and Bognor Regis, dividing at Horsham

In the peak hours, the station is served by a single service between Bognor Regis and London Bridge.

On Sundays, there is an hourly Southern service between London Victoria and Bognor Regis and Portsmouth Harbour, which divides at Barnham (instead of Horsham), and an hourly Thameslink service between Horsham and Bedford (instead of Peterborough).

Preceding station	National Rail	Following station
Three Bridges	Thameslink Arun Valley Line	Ifield
Three Bridges	Southern Arun Valley Line	Horsham
Three Bridges	Southern Arun Valley Line	Ifield Limited service

== Signal box ==
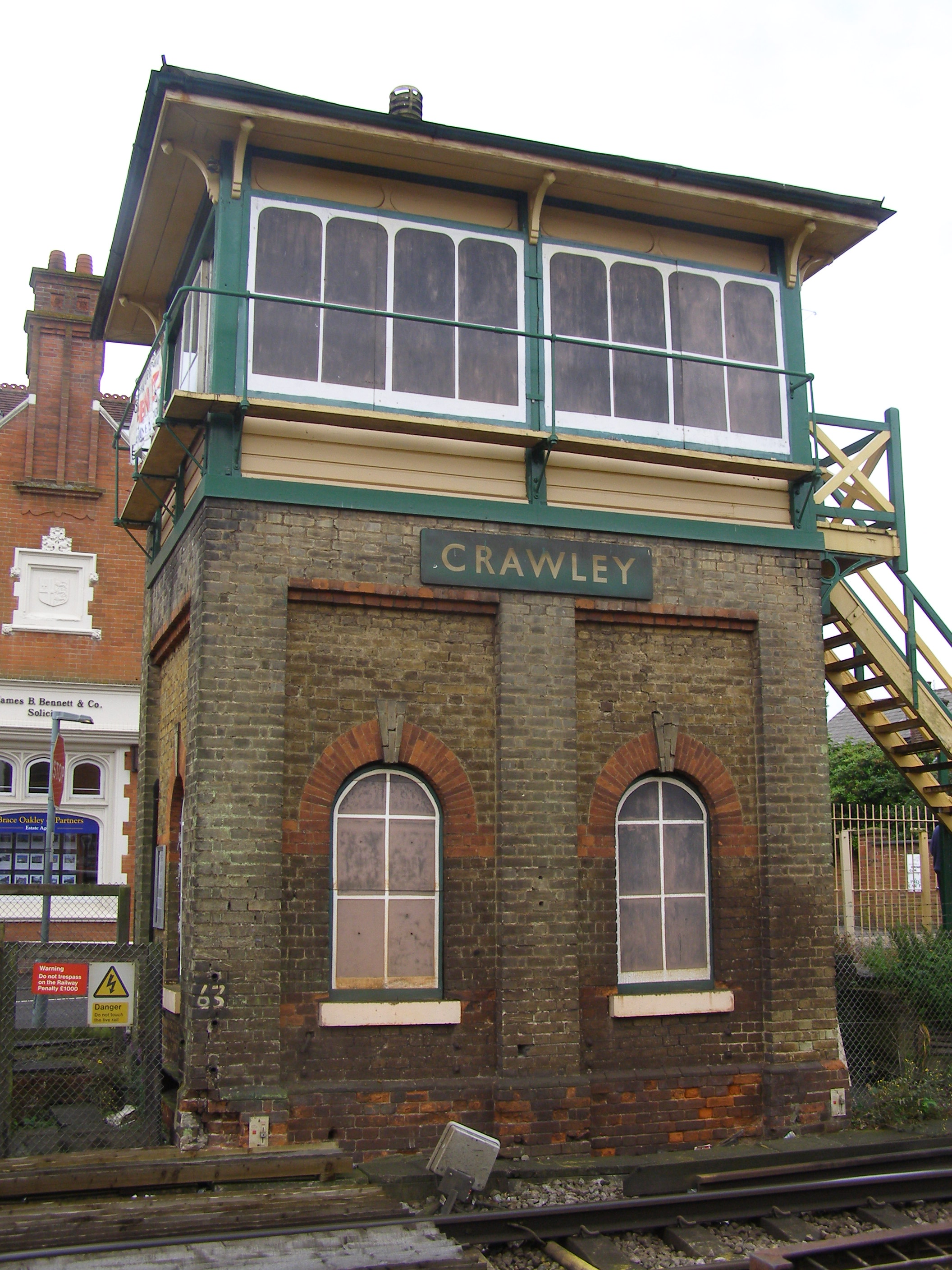
Crawley Signal Box

The original signal box, dating from 1877, survives. It is a tall box with a timber superstructure on a brick base and was built by the firm of Saxby and Farmer. It was made redundant in 1978 when the railway level crossing gates were removed. It is a Grade II listed building and has recently been partially restored.

The former goods yard to the east of the old Crawley Station was closed in the 1960s and demolished to make way for the new station.
