= Roffey Road Halt railway station =

Former railway station in England

Coordinates: 51.08643°N 0.28519°W

Roffey Road Halt
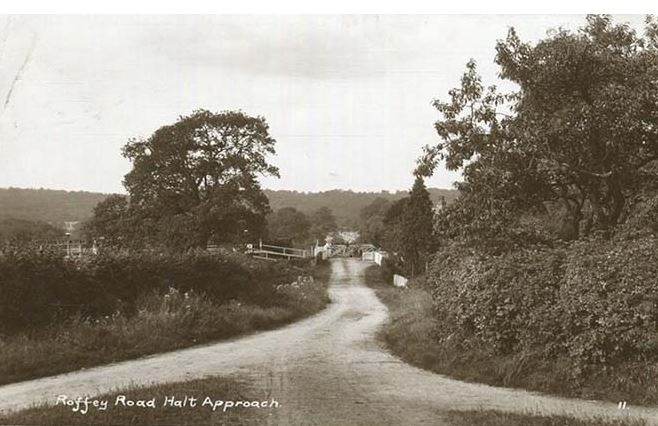

General information
- Location: Roffey, Horsham, West Sussex; England
- Grid reference: TQ202333
- Platforms: 2

Other information
- Status: Disused

History
- Pre-grouping: London, Brighton and South Coast Railway
- Post-grouping: Southern Railway

Key dates
- 1 June 1907: Opened as "Roffey Crossing Halt"
- July 1907: Renamed "Roffey Road Halt"
- 1 January 1917: Closed
- 3 May 1920: Reopened
- 3 January 1937: Closed
Location

Roffey Road Halt is a now disused station on the Arun Valley Line in West Sussex, England and was the second station north from Horsham on the stretch to Crawley. It occupied a rural setting and opened on 1 June 1907 as a steam railmotor halt, introduced as an attempt to increase use of rural train services. The anticipated housing growth did not occur and it was closed in 1937 by the Southern Railway. Some associated cottages were demolished in the early 1970s. The only visible signs of its existence are a number of concrete posts that supported the platforms.

It is likely that the site and associated land next to the old station will be developed in the 2020s. A large housing estate of 2700 houses and a new park and ride railway station at this site have been approved.

== Further bibliography ==
- Gray, Adrian, The Railways of Mid-Sussex, Oakwood Press (1975)
- Mitchell, Vic; Keith Smith (1986). Southern Main Lines: Crawley to Littlehampton. Midhurst: Middleton Press. ISBN 0-906520-34-7.

Preceding station	Disused railways	Following station
Faygate; Line and station open	London, Brighton and South Coast Railway; Arun Valley Line	Littlehaven; Line and station open
