= St Mary's Church, Billingshurst =

Church in West Sussex, England

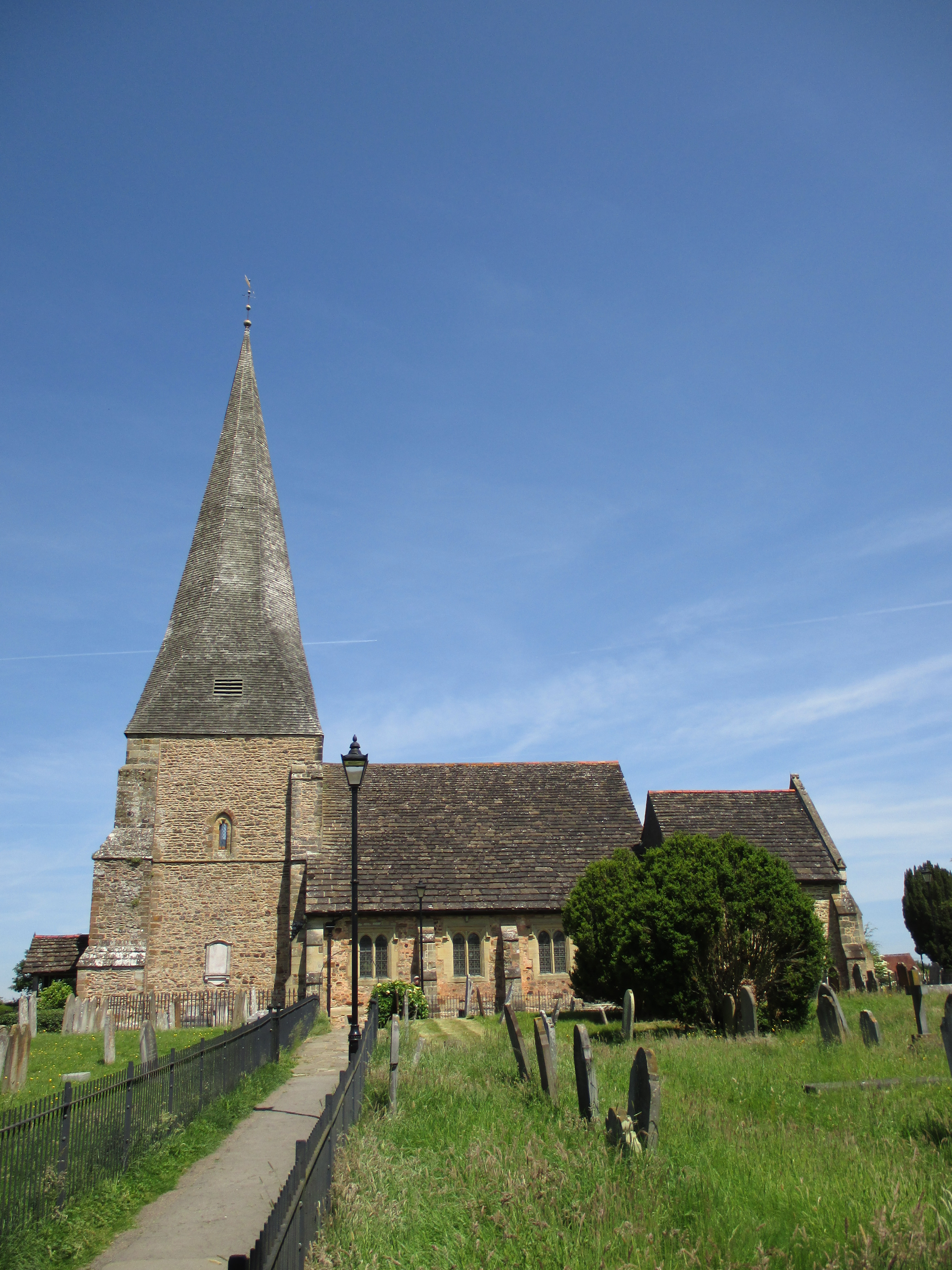
- St Mary's Church viewed from the south in 2018

- Location within West Sussex
- 51°01′20″N 0°27′03″W
- Address: St Mary's Church, East Street, Billingshurst, West Sussex, RH14 9PY
- Country: England
- Denomination: Church of England
- Previous denomination: Catholicism (pre-English Reformation)
- Tradition: Anglicanism
- Website: www.stmarysbillingshurst.org

History
- Founded: 12th century
- Founder(s): Unknown, most likely the then-incumbent de Braose Lord of Bramber
- Dedication: Saint Mary

Architecture
- Functional status: Parish church
- Heritage designation

Listed Building – Grade I
- Designated: 22 September 1959
- Reference no.: 1354139

Administration
- Province: Canterbury
- Diocese: Chichester
- Archdeaconry: Horsham
- Deanery: Horsham
- Parish: Billingshurst

Clergy
- Vicar: The Reverend David Beal (2016–present)

St Mary's Church is the Grade I listed Anglican parish church of Billingshurst, a village and civil parish in the Horsham District of West Sussex, England. It was founded in the 12th century.

== History ==
The construction of St Mary's Church began in the 12th century, possibly as early as 1100AD. The manorial lord who founded the present church is not known, although it most likely would have been the then-incumbent de Braose Lord of Bramber. The church first came under the aegis of Arundel Priory, and in 1250, Saint Richard of Chichester, then Bishop of Chichester, formed vicarages in parishes where he believed the monks of the priory were being neglectful. As a result, the earliest part of the church surviving today was probably built around 1160-1200, before the monks had begun to neglect parishes under their aegis, of which Billingshurst was one. Thomas de Selhurst was recorded as being vicar in 1274 and is the church's earliest vicar known by name.

== See also ==
- Grade I listed buildings in West Sussex
- List of places of worship in Horsham District
