= Frank Patterson (illustrator) =

English illustrator

Frank Patterson (12 October 1871 – 17 July 1952) was an English illustrator best remembered for his pen and ink drawings of cycling in the first half of the 20th century.

== Personal life ==
Frank Patterson was born in Portsmouth into a family of seafarers. After completing his studies at Portsmouth School of Art he walked to London seeking fame and fortune. Producing pen and ink illustrations for books and magazines was the only way he could make a living. Most of his drawing was done with a Gillott 303 pen with a goose quill - "slapping in the pork", to use his own expression.

Early in 1898 Frank and his wife Emily leased a derelict Elizabethan property near Billingshurst in West Sussex for an annual rent of nine-pence (3½p); it remained their home for the next 54 years. The house had no name so they called it Pear Tree Farm, a reference to the only recognisable tree.

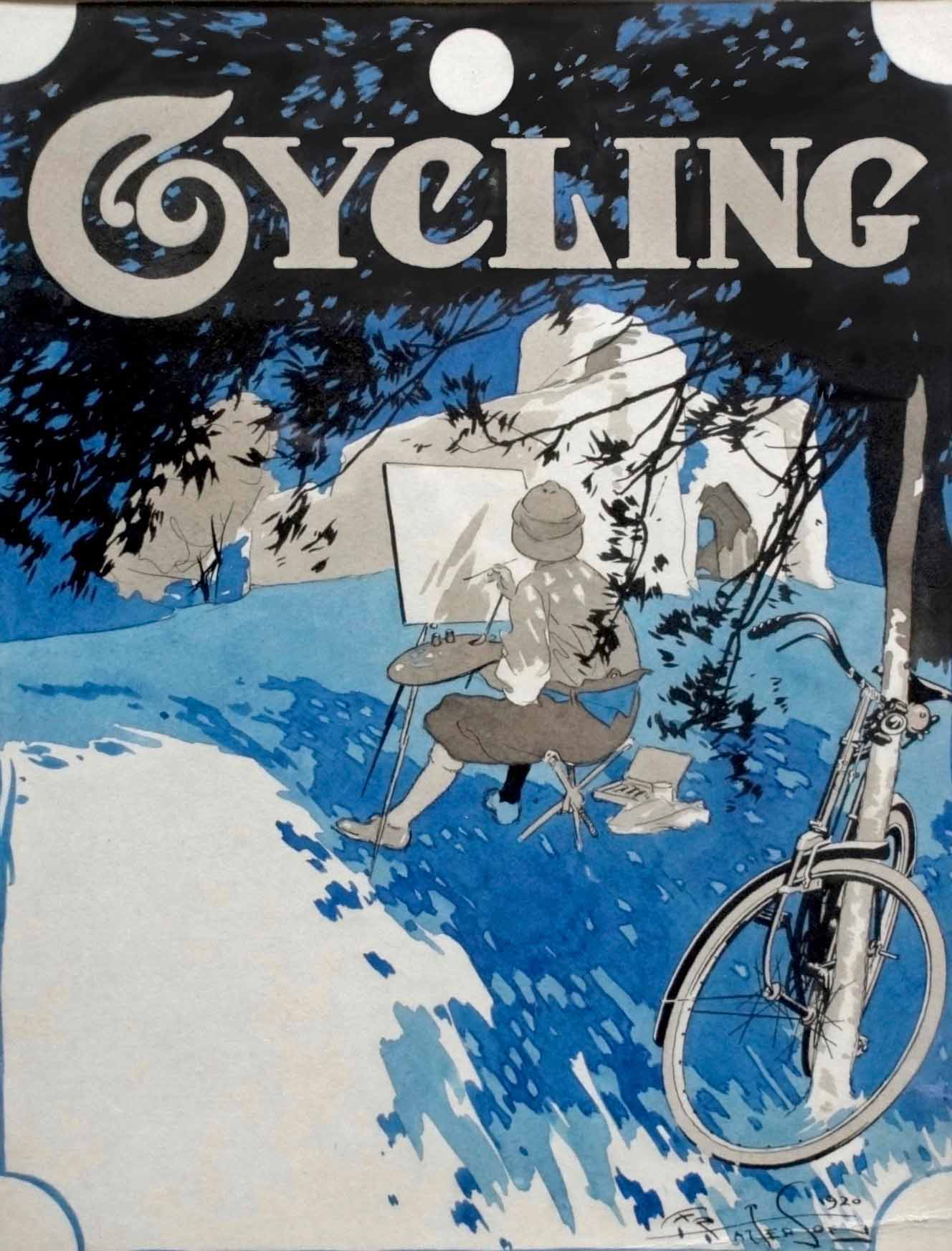
Frank Patterson: Cycling Magazine Cover Art 1920

His connection with Cycling Weekly magazine began in 1893 and continued until his death eventually serving under six editors. For this magazine and from 1925 for The Gazette, the Cyclists' Touring Club magazine, he produced over 26,000 drawings and boasted that he never missed a deadline. He worked for other Temple Press magazines, drew Boer War pictures for The Illustrated London News, and illustrations for The Book of the Home and The House.

Patterson cycled until the age of 38 when he switched to walking after a leg injury. From then on he often worked from photographs and postcards provided by friends. In 1944, he was awarded the Bidlake Memorial Prize for "his joyous delineation of the pastime of cycling for 51 years, and the pleasure his work has given in particular to cyclists serving their country the world over during 1944". In 1950 his health began to deteriorate and on 17 July 1952 he died. At his own request his ashes were scattered at Pear Tree Farm.

== Publications ==
- Patterson, Frank (1948) The Patterson Book. Temple Press
- Patterson, Frank (1952) The Second Patterson Book. Temple Press
- Patterson, Frank (1978) The Frank Patterson Picture Book. Cyclists' Touring Club
- Patterson, Frank (1979) The Art of Frank Patterson. Cyclists' Touring Club
- Patterson, Frank (1982) Frank Patterson The Cycling Artist. Forest Publishing
- Patterson, Frank (1990) Memories of Frank Patterson. Jim Willis
- Patterson, Frank (1992-9) Britain's Counties (10 vols). GM Designs/RGB Sport and Leisure
- Patterson, Frank (1993) Britain Off Pat. Flying Scot Publications. ISBN 0-9522477-0-4
- Patterson, Frank (1996) Frank Patterson The Early Years. Janet Willis

== Gallery ==
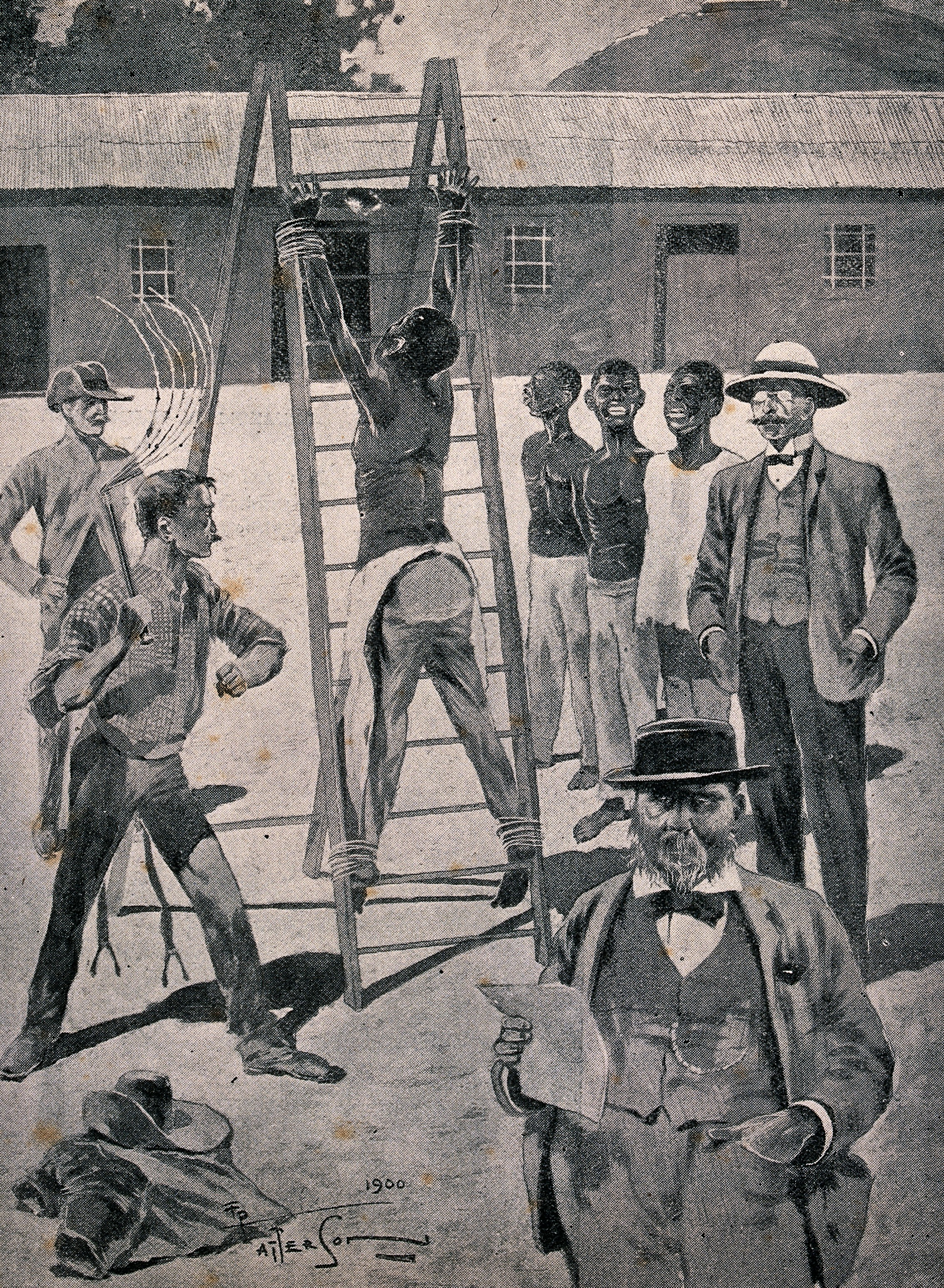
The Boer method of punishing natives (1900)
