= Petworth railway station =

Former railway station in England

Coordinates: 50.96317°N 0.62011°W

Petworth
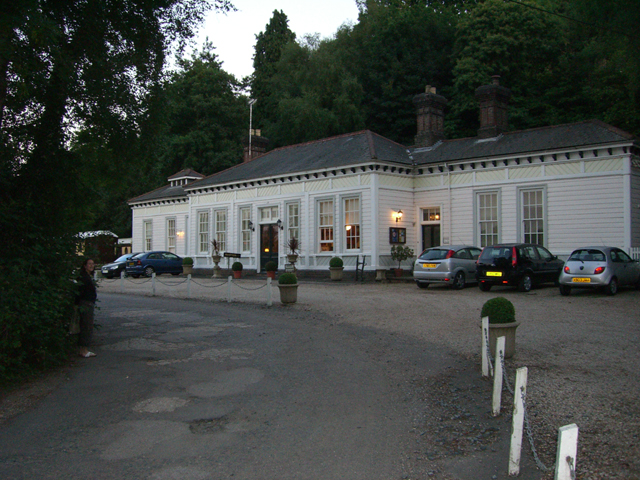

General information
- Location: Petworth, Chichester, West Sussex; England
- Grid reference: SU969191
- Platforms: 1

Other information
- Status: Disused

History
- Pre-grouping: London, Brighton and South Coast Railway
- Post-grouping: Southern Railway; Southern Region of British Railways

Key dates
- 10 October 1859: Station opened
- 1892: Rebuilt
- 5 February 1955: Station closed (passengers)
- 20 May 1966: Station closed (freight)
Location

Petworth railway station was a railway station nearly 2 miles (3.2 km) south of Petworth in West Sussex, England.

It was on the former London, Brighton and South Coast Railway single track Pulborough to Midhurst branch line. It had a single platform, and a passing loop for freight trains, together with a signal box and goods facilities.

The line was opened to here on 10 October 1859 and extended westwards to Midhurst in 1866. The main station building was rebuilt in about 1892 and is a wooden single-storey structure with architectural embellishments.

The station was closed to passengers by the Southern Region of British Railways on 5 February 1955 and to freight traffic on 20 May 1966. Some time after this, the station building was converted to a guest house and a number of former Pullman lounge cars converted to camping coaches have been relocated here from Marazion in Cornwall as sleeping accommodation.

Preceding station	Disused railways	Following station
Fittleworth	Midhurst Railways	Selham
