= Ellen and Edith Beck =

British suffragettes

Ellen Beck (1845 – 1940) and Edith Beck (1847 – 1930) were sisters who founded The Women’s Hall and The Mother’s Garden in Billingshurst, West Sussex. They were Quakers and British suffragettes.

Ellen and Edith were members of the Women’s Social and Political Union and later in the 1930's the Women’s Freedom League. Edith Beck was arrested for her participation in the Black Friday protests in November 1910. Both sisters went, with Kitty Marshall, on the deputation from Caxton Hall to Parliament Square. They took part in the Women’s March from Edinburgh to September in 1912. Harriet Kerr recuperated in a cottage on their farm after her release from prison in 1913.

== Early life and family ==
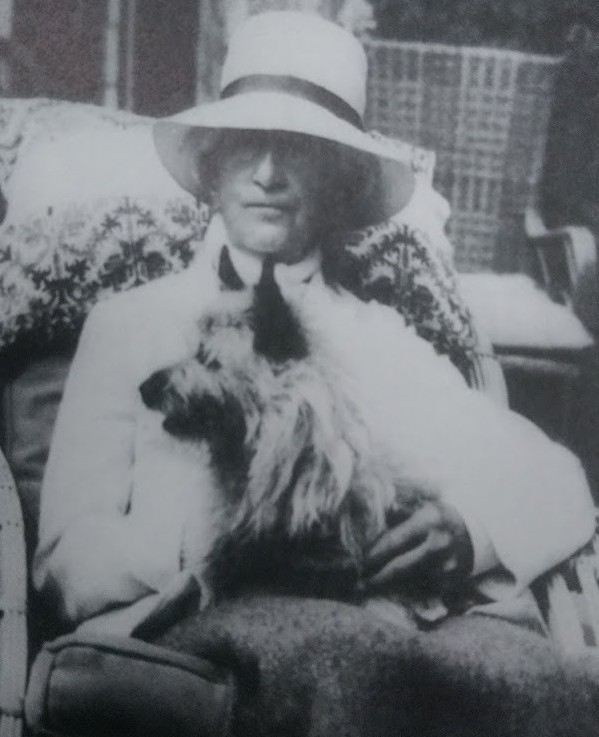
Photograph of Ellen Beck and dog.

Ellen Beck was born on 11 July 1845, and Edith Beck was born on 2 February 1847. They were part of a large Quaker family of ten siblings who lived in Isleworth, Middlesex.

Their father, Edward Beck, was a slate merchant and wharfinger who maintained a wharf on the River Thames. He later became a renowned horticulturalist. Their great-aunt, Mary Lister, founded the Invalid Asylum for Respectable Women in 1825 and they were cousins to Joseph Lister, British surgeon and pioneer of antiseptic surgery. Their brother, Marcus Beck, was a British Professor of Surgery at University College Hospital.

In addition, Ellen and Edith’s maternal grandfather was William Lucas (1804-1861), a Quaker diarist whose published journal detailed his life as a member of the Society of Friends. He was an abolitionist who is recorded as having attended the British and Foreign Anti-Slavery Society convention in 1840.

== Community life ==
The Beck sisters brought Duncan's Farm near Billingshurst in 1901 and were active contributors to the community.

Ellen was on the committee of the Billingshurst Horticultural Society and they were joint presidents of the Billingshurst Women’s Institute. Their philanthropy extended to a range of activities, including purchasing the uniforms and instruments for the Billingshurst Band. Education of children, particularly those from disadvantaged backgrounds. In 1932, two years after her sister’s death, Ellen was pivotal in providing funds towards the provision of hot meals at Billingshurst’s junior school, this was the first school in West Sussex to provide cooked lunches for pupils. They were also connected with Christ’s Hospital girls school, then situated in Hertford, providing a sports pavilion.

The Beck sisters’ most long-lasting contribution to the village is the Women’s Hall, originally conceived as a place where women and children could meet. It was officially opened in November 1923 by the Right Honourable Mrs Bruce, the wife of Stanley Bruce, Australia’s newly-elected Prime Minister. The Mother’s Garden followed in 1926.

== Suffrage activity ==
Ellen and Edith Beck were both long term members of the WSPU and tax resisters.

On 18 November 1910, Black Friday, 300 suffragettes marched on Whitehall, determined to present their case to Prime Minister Asquith. Edith Beck was amongst the protesters. The police arrested 119 women, including Edith, alongside Kitty Marshall. Both women were charged with obstruction and then discharged.

During the 1911 census, Emmeline Pankhurst called on women to boycott the census. Ellen and Edith’s absence from the records suggests that they were evaders.

The sisters provided refuge for suffragette Harriet Kerr, allowing her to recuperate at Hook Cottage following her temporary release from her 12-month prison sentence during the Cat and Mouse Act.
