= Billingshurst railway station =

Railway station in West Sussex, England

Coordinates: 51.015°N 0.450°W

Billingshurst
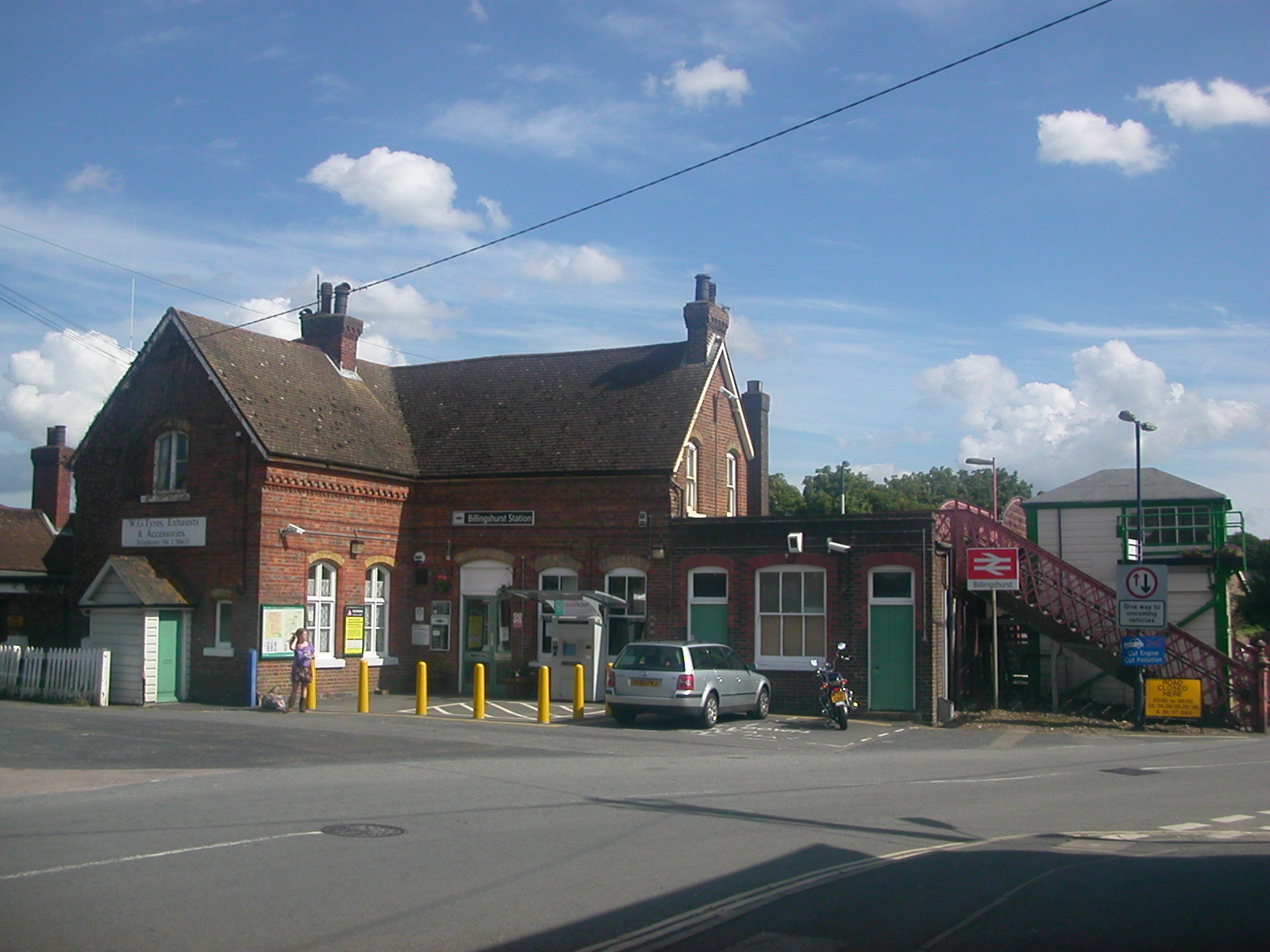

General information
- Location: Billingshurst, Horsham, West Sussex; England
- Grid reference: TQ088251
- Managed by: Southern
- Platforms: 2

Other information
- Station code: BIG
- Classification: DfT category E

History
- Opened: 10 October 1859

Passengers
- 2020/21: ▼0.110 million
- 2021/22: ▲0.310 million
- 2022/23: ▲0.391 million
- 2023/24: ▲0.408 million
- 2024/25: ▲0.447 million
Location
Notes
- Passenger statistics from the Office of Rail and Road

Billingshurst Railway Station serves the market town of Billingshurst, in West Sussex, England. It is on the Arun Valley Line 44 miles 71 chains (72.2 km) down the line from London Bridge via Redhill. The station is operated by Southern. The signalbox was believed to be the oldest operational box in the country, and in May 2016 was moved to Amberley Museum and Heritage Centre.

Until 2006 both platforms were only 4 coaches long. Since then the platform for trains towards Pulborough has been extended to take 8 coaches and more recently the London-bound platform has also now been extended to 8-car length.

== History ==
The station was built by the Mid-Sussex Railway and opened along with the line from Horsham to Petworth on 10 October 1859. From the outset, the line was worked by the London Brighton and South Coast Railway, which bought it out in 1862.

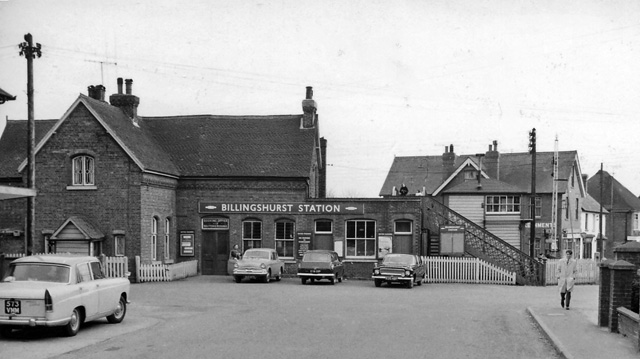
Exterior view of station in 1964

== Services ==
All services at Billingshurst are operated by Southern using Class 377 EMUs.

The typical off-peak service in trains per hour is:

- 2 tph to London Victoria via Gatwick Airport
- 2 tph to Bognor Regis

In the peak hours, the station is served by a single service between Bognor Regis and London Bridge.

On Sundays, there is an hourly service but southbound trains divide at Barnham with an additional portion of the train travelling to Portsmouth Harbour.

Preceding station	National Rail	Following station
Christ's Hospital	Southern Arun Valley Line	Pulborough
