= Fittleworth railway station =

Former railway station in England

Coordinates: 50.9536°N 0.5667°W

Fittleworth
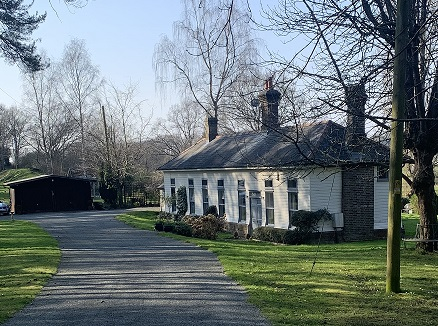
- Fittleworth station in March 2022

General information
- Location: Fittleworth, Chichester, West Sussex; England
- Grid reference: TQ007181
- Platforms: 1

Other information
- Status: Disused

History
- Pre-grouping: London, Brighton and South Coast Railway
- Post-grouping: Southern Railway; Southern Region of British Railways

Key dates
- 1859: Line opened
- September 1889: Station opened
- February 1955: Station closed (passengers)
- May 1963: Station closed (freight)
- 1966: Line closed
Location

Fittleworth railway station served the village of Fittleworth in the county of West Sussex in England. It was on the London Brighton and South Coast Railway's line between Pulborough and Midhurst.

The station opened some years after the line (1859) in September 1889 and closed to passengers in February 1955. Freight traffic from Fittleworth ceased in 1963 three years before total closure in 1966. The small station building remained undeveloped for many years, becoming more and more derelict, reaching its all time low in roughly 1960. However the main station was restored and converted into a private dwelling in 1987, the builders restoring the third chimney stack, while the rest like the platelayers hut and the grain shed was left to rot. A wreckage of a train is rumored to be there.

The station appeared in the film Two-Way Stretch with Peter Sellers.

Preceding station	Disused railways	Following station
Pulborough	Midhurst Railways	Petworth
