= Faygate =

Village in West Sussex, England

Coordinates: 51.09448°N 0.26189°W

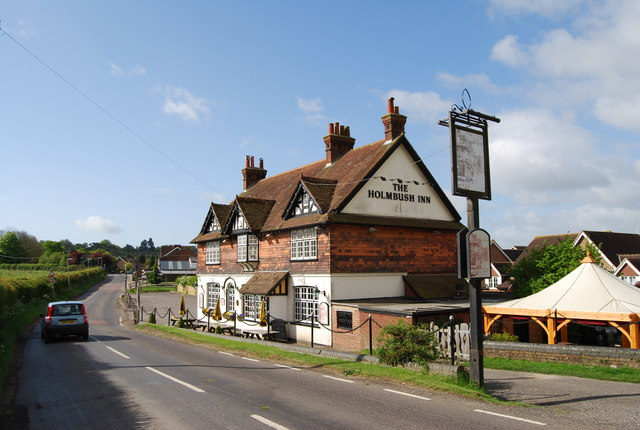
- The Holmbush Inn, Faygate Lane

- Location within West Sussex
- OS grid reference: TQ218342
- Civil parish: Colgate
- District: Horsham
- Shire county: West Sussex
- Region: South East
- Country: England
- Sovereign state: United Kingdom
- Post town: Horsham
- Postcode district: RH12 4
- Dialling code: 01293
- Police: Sussex
- Fire: West Sussex
- Ambulance: South East Coast
- UK Parliament: Horsham

Faygate is a village in the Horsham district of West Sussex, England. It lies on the A264 road 3.4 miles (5.4 km) south west of Crawley. It has a railway station on the Arun Valley Line with trains connecting to London and Portsmouth. The village is in the green belt between Crawley and Horsham.

The village of Faygate is directly north west of Colgate, across the A264 road and west of Kilnwood Vale. Other nearby settlements include Lambs Green, Rusper and Pease Pottage.

The name Faygate was first recorded in 1614.
