= Pulborough railway station =

Railway station in West Sussex, England

Coordinates: 50.957°N 0.517°W

Pulborough
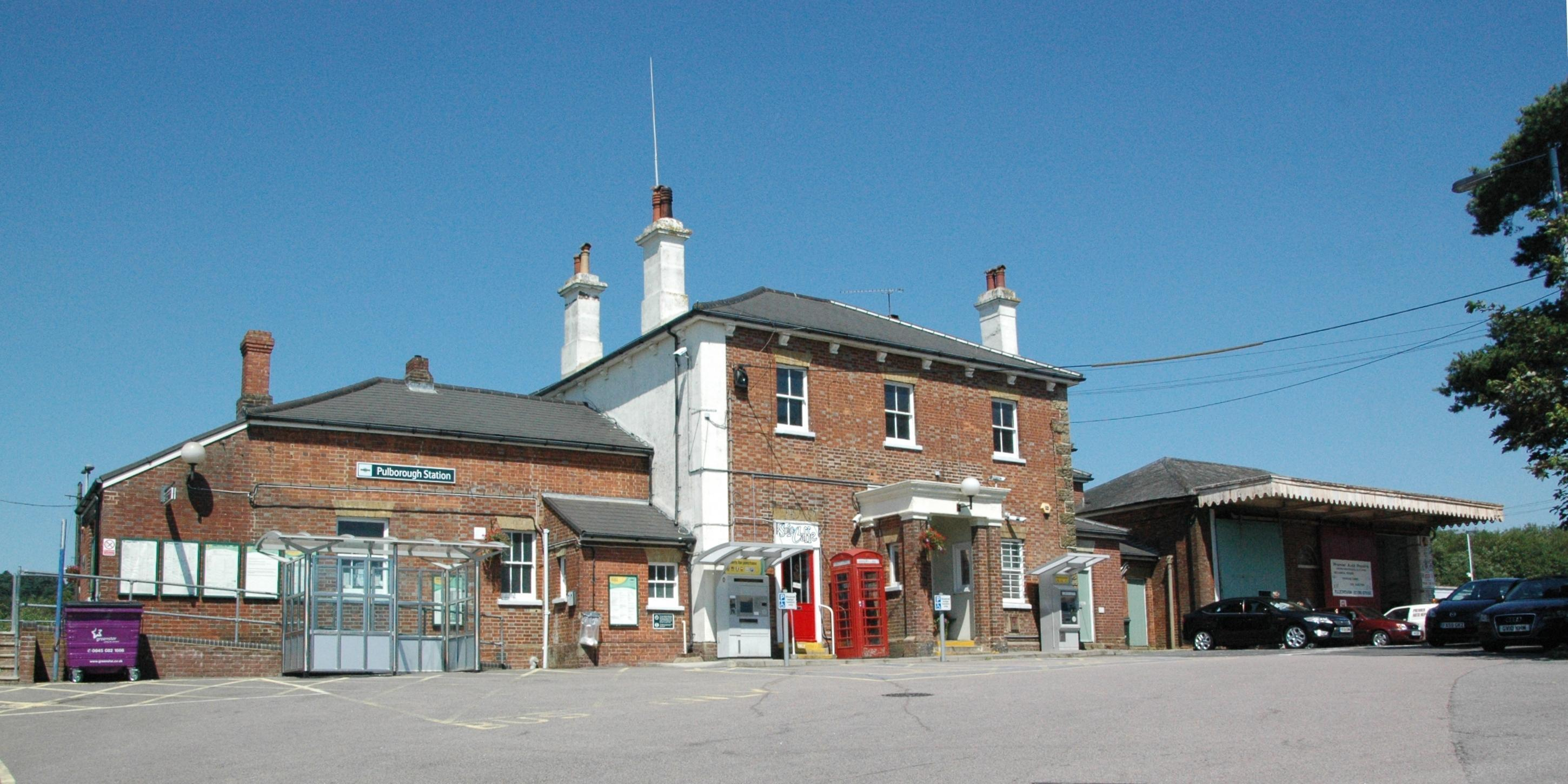

General information
- Location: Pulborough, Horsham, West Sussex; England
- Grid reference: TQ042186
- Manager: Southern
- Platforms: 2

Other information
- Station code: PUL
- Classification: DfT category D

Key dates
- 10 October 1859: Opened

Passengers
- 2020/21: ▼71,754
- 2021/22: ▲0.224 million
- 2022/23: ▲0.286 million
- 2023/24: ▲0.305 million
- 2024/25: ▲0.320 million
Location
Notes
- Passenger statistics from the Office of Rail and Road

Pulborough railway station serves the West Sussex village of Pulborough. It is at the western end of the village, just off the A283 road. It is 50 miles (80 km) down the line from London Bridge via Redhill.

== History ==
The first railway to reach Pulborough was that from Horsham to Petworth, opened on 10 October 1859 and extended to Midhurst in 1866. Pulborough and Billingshurst were the only two intermediate stations at the time. Four years later a link was made to the Brighton to Portsmouth line; the new line diverged from the Petworth branch at Hardham Junction just south of Pulborough.

Three platform faces were provided: a Down side platform on which the main station buildings stood, and an island platform whose western face was used by Midhurst line trains.By World War II, these terminated at Pulborough rather than running to Horsham or beyond. Goods facilities and a cattle market were provided.

Passenger train services to Midhurst and Petersfield were withdrawn in 1955, leaving just the Arun Valley Line serving Pulborough. The goods yard was closed in the mid-1960s and converted into a car park, and the goods shed is now a car repair centre. The station buildings, including a large, wide canopy on the island platform, remain largely unchanged but only two platform faces are now in use. The former up loop line used by Midhurst line trains has been removed.

== Services ==
All services at Pulborough are operated by Southern using Class 377 EMUs.

The typical off-peak service in trains per hour is:

- 2 tph to London Victoria via Gatwick Airport
- 2 tph to Bognor Regis

In the peak hours, the station is served by a single service between Bognor Regis (via Littlehampton) and London Bridge.

On Sundays, there is an hourly service but southbound trains divide at Barnham, with an additional portion of the train travelling to Portsmouth Harbour.

Preceding station	National Rail	Following station
Billingshurst	Southern Arun Valley Line	Amberley
	Disused railways	
Terminus	London, Brighton and South Coast Railway Midhurst Railways	Fittleworth

== Gallery ==
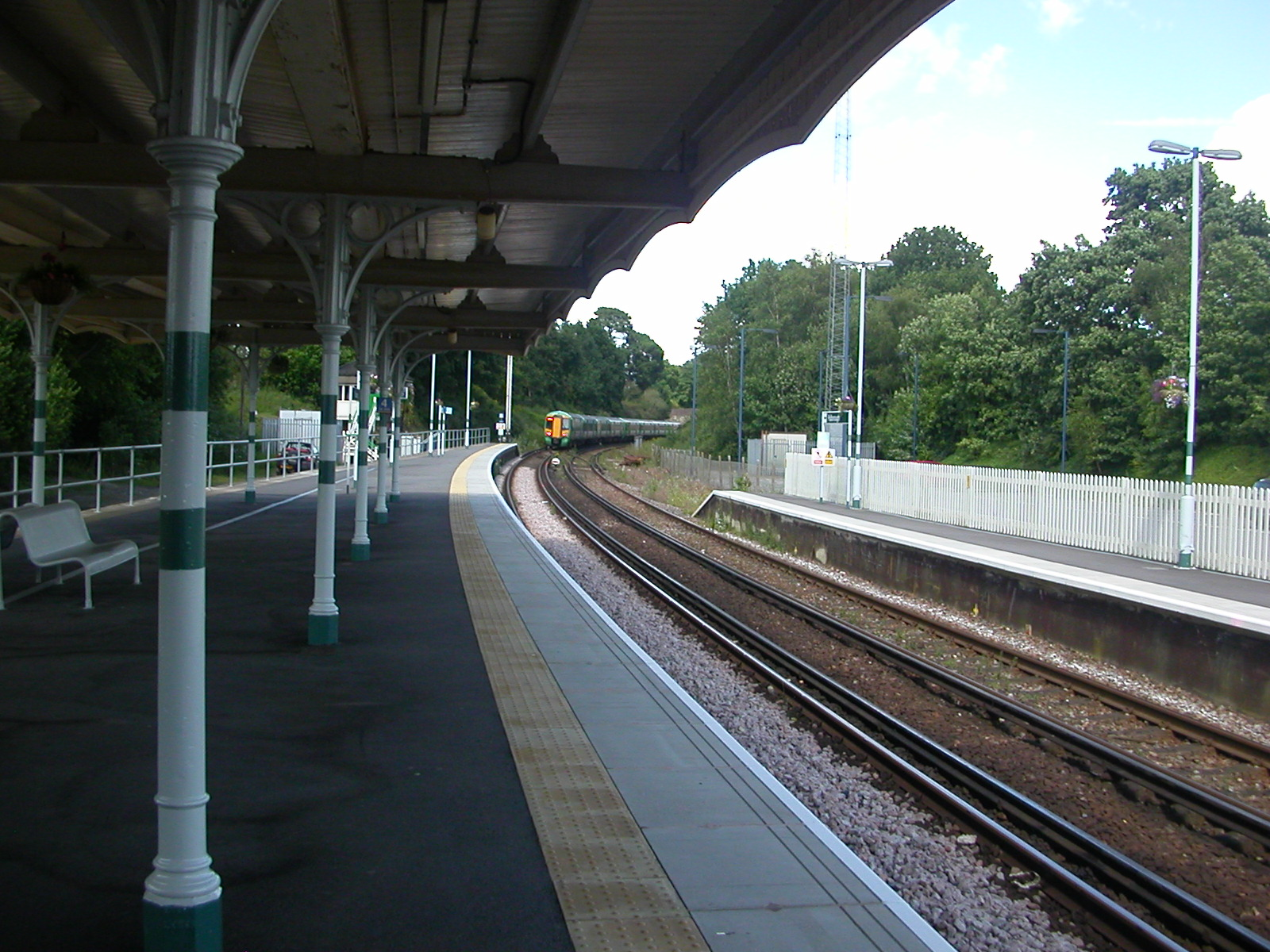
Northward view with London Victoria train that has departed the station

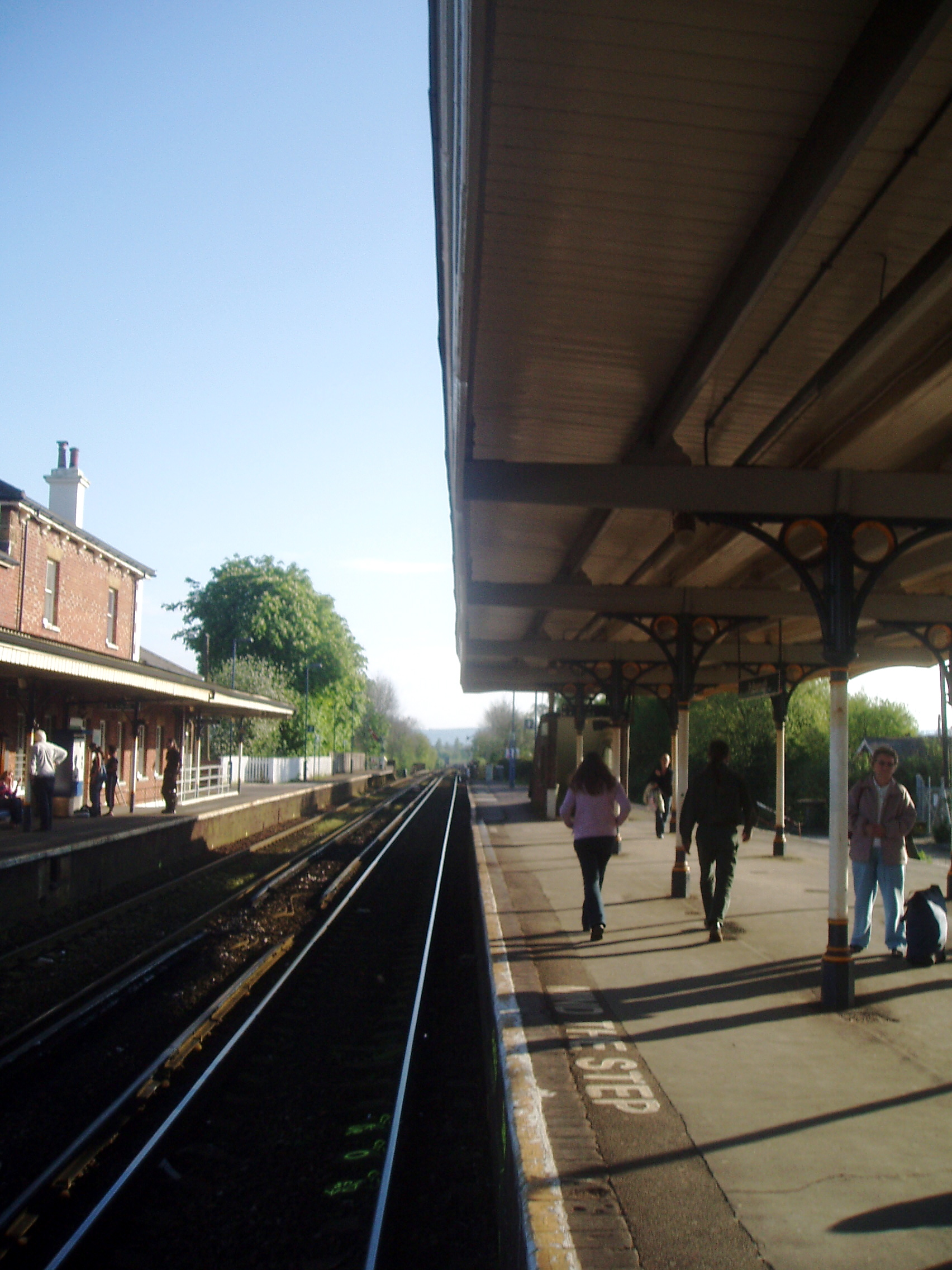
Southward view from the island platform

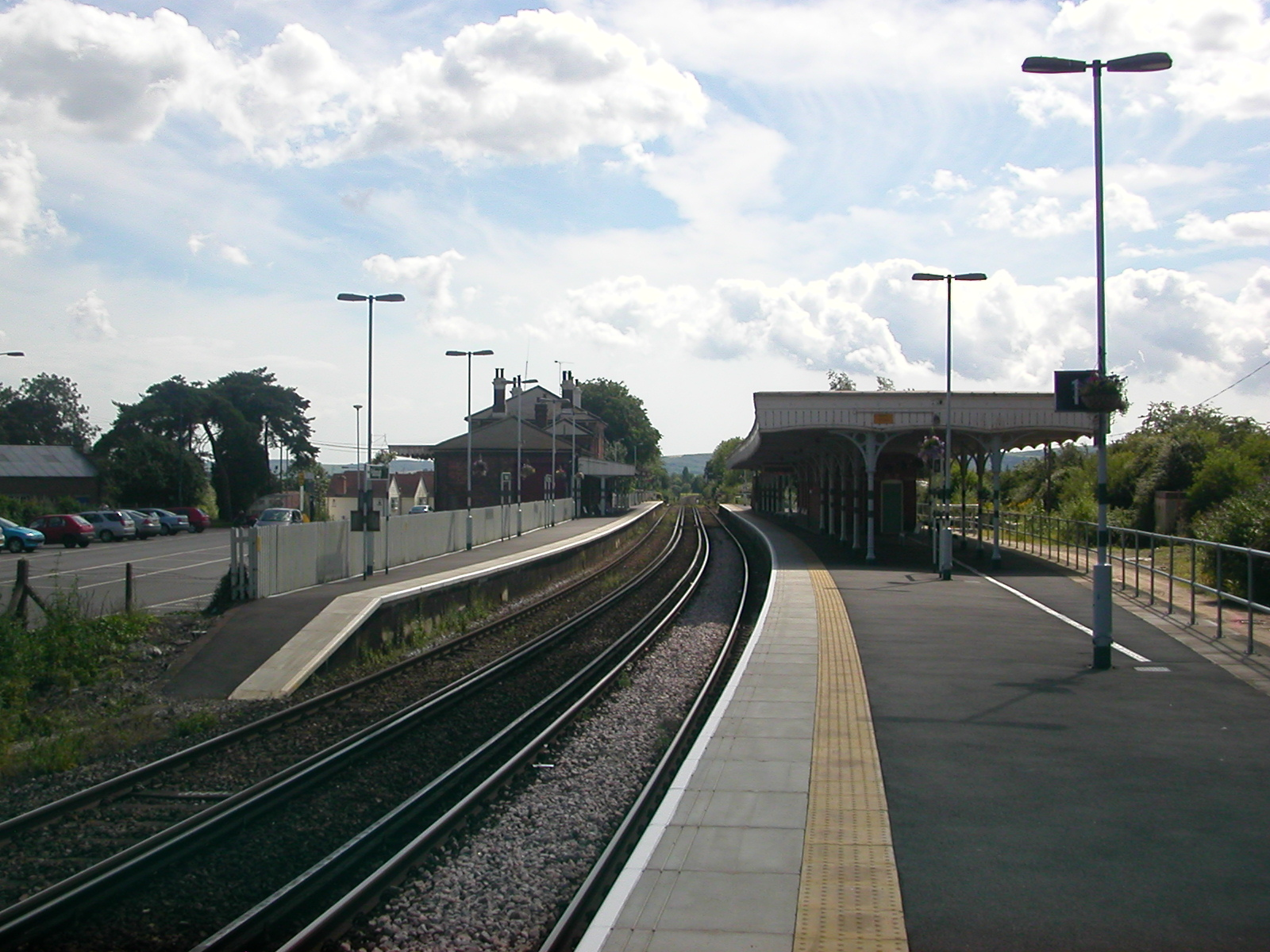
Another general southward view

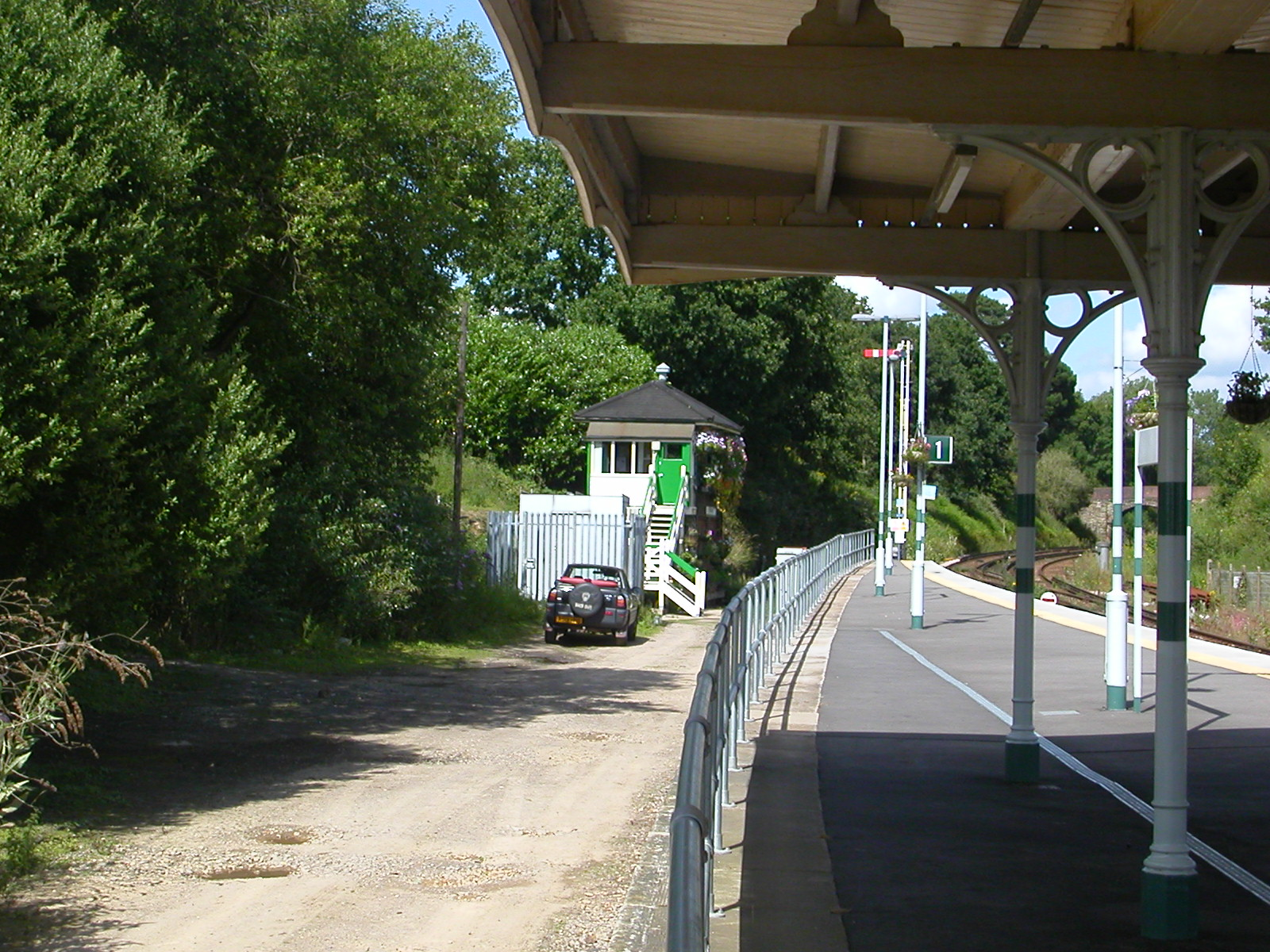
The signal box and filled-in Midhurst platform

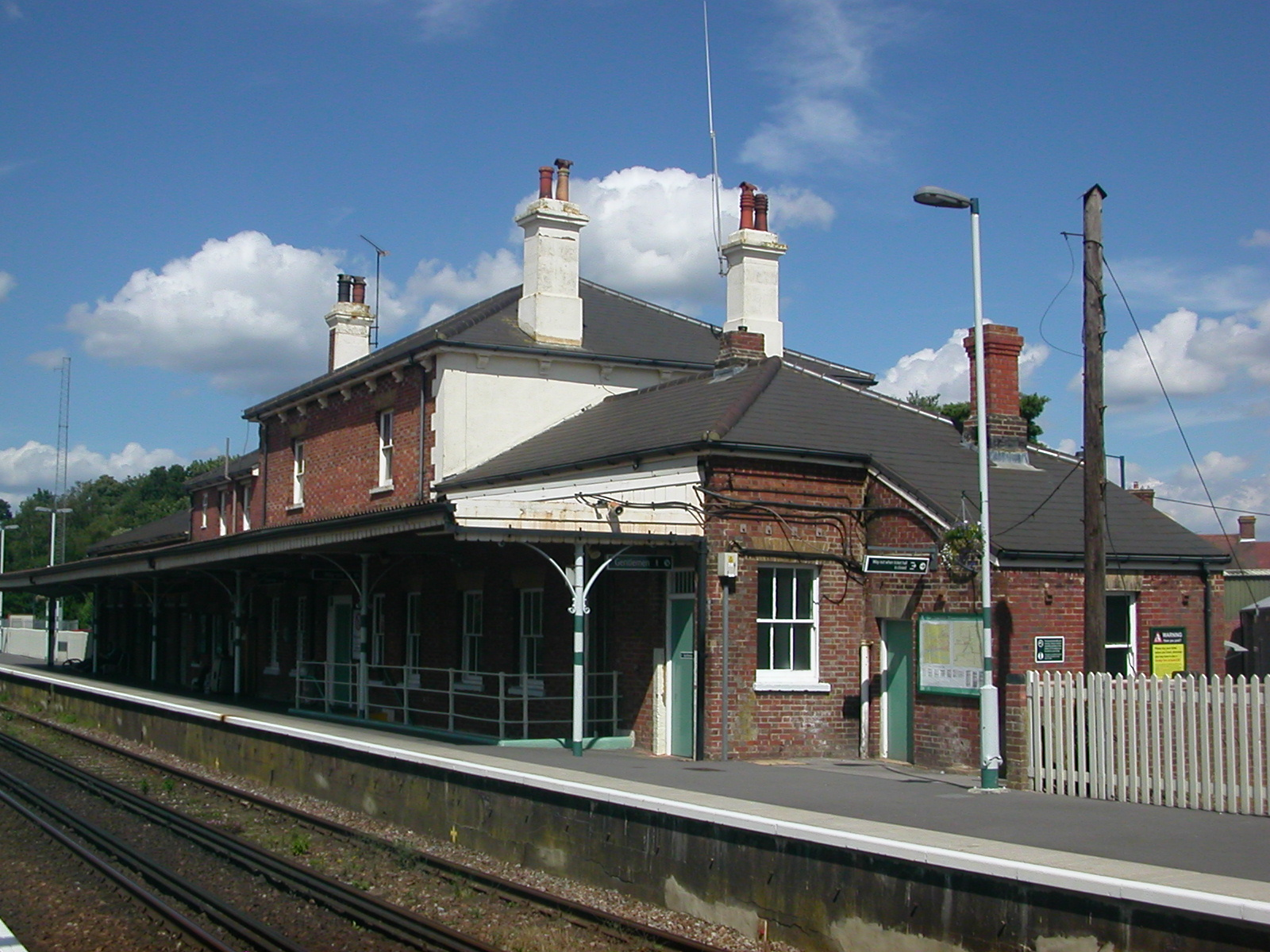
Station buildings from the platforms

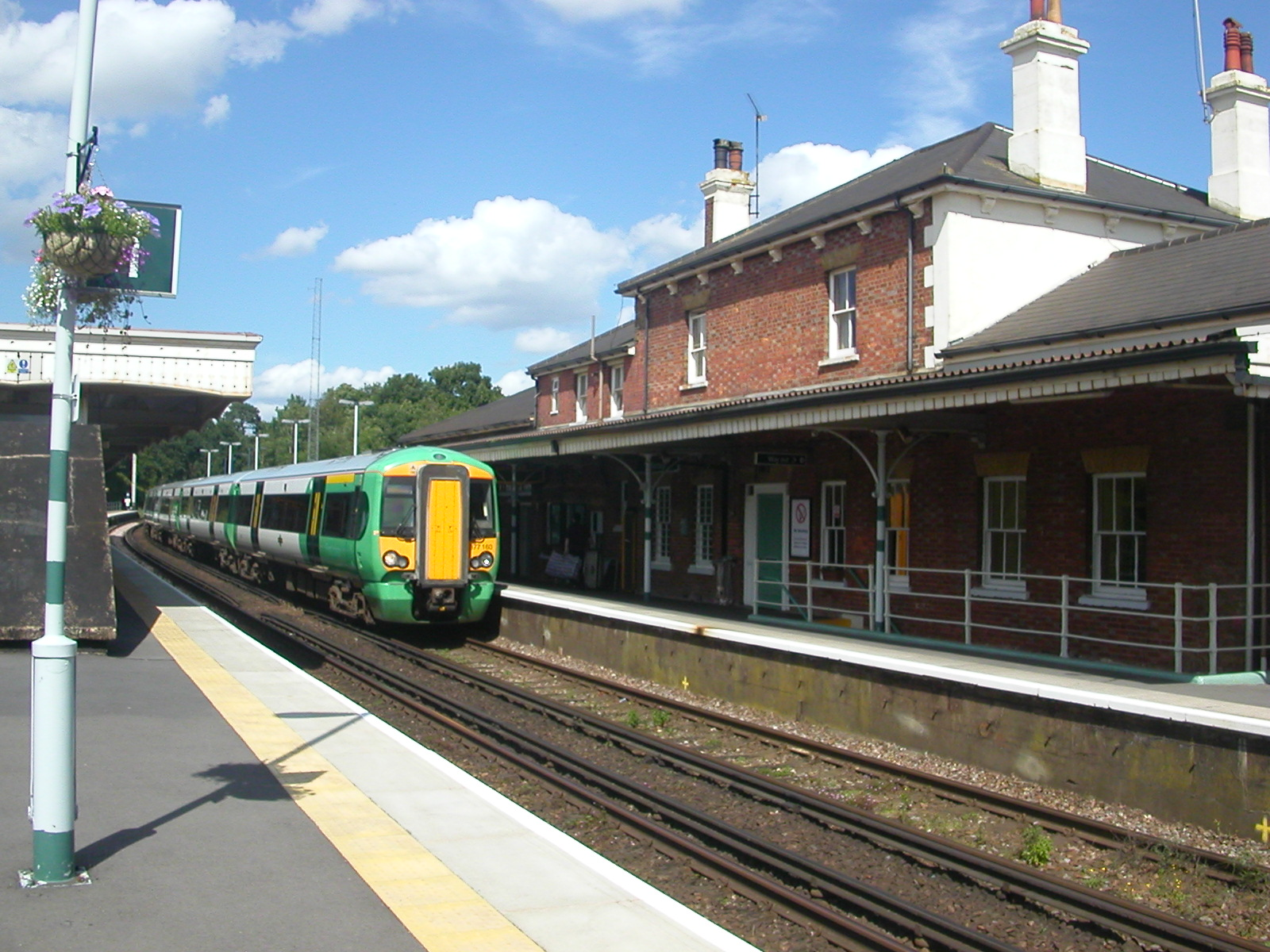
Station buildings with a Portsmouth-bound train arriving at Platform 2 in the foreground.
