= Lambs Green =

Hamlet in West Sussex, England

Coordinates: 51.11583°N 0.26174°W

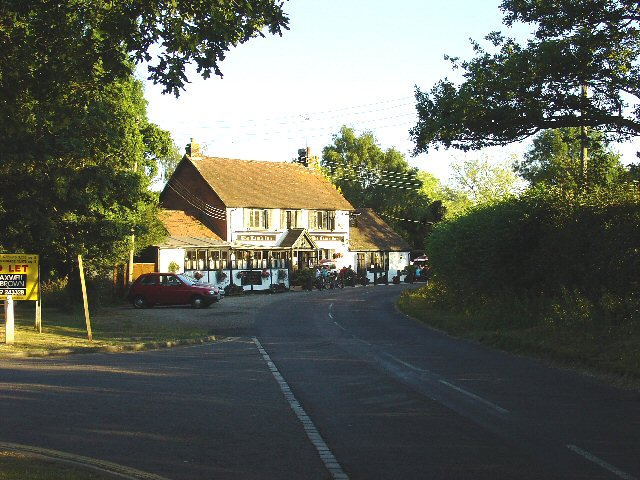
- The Lamb Inn, Lambs Green

- Location within West Sussex
- OS grid reference: TQ217366
- Civil parish: Rusper
- District: Horsham
- Shire county: West Sussex
- Region: South East
- Country: England
- Sovereign state: United Kingdom
- Police: Sussex
- Fire: West Sussex
- Ambulance: South East Coast
- UK Parliament: Horsham

Lambs Green is a hamlet in the civil parish of Rusper and the Horsham District of West Sussex, England. It lies on the Rusper to Ifield road 3.1 miles (5 km) west of Crawley.
