= Littlehaven railway station =

Railway station in West Sussex, England

Coordinates: 51.080°N 0.308°W

Littlehaven
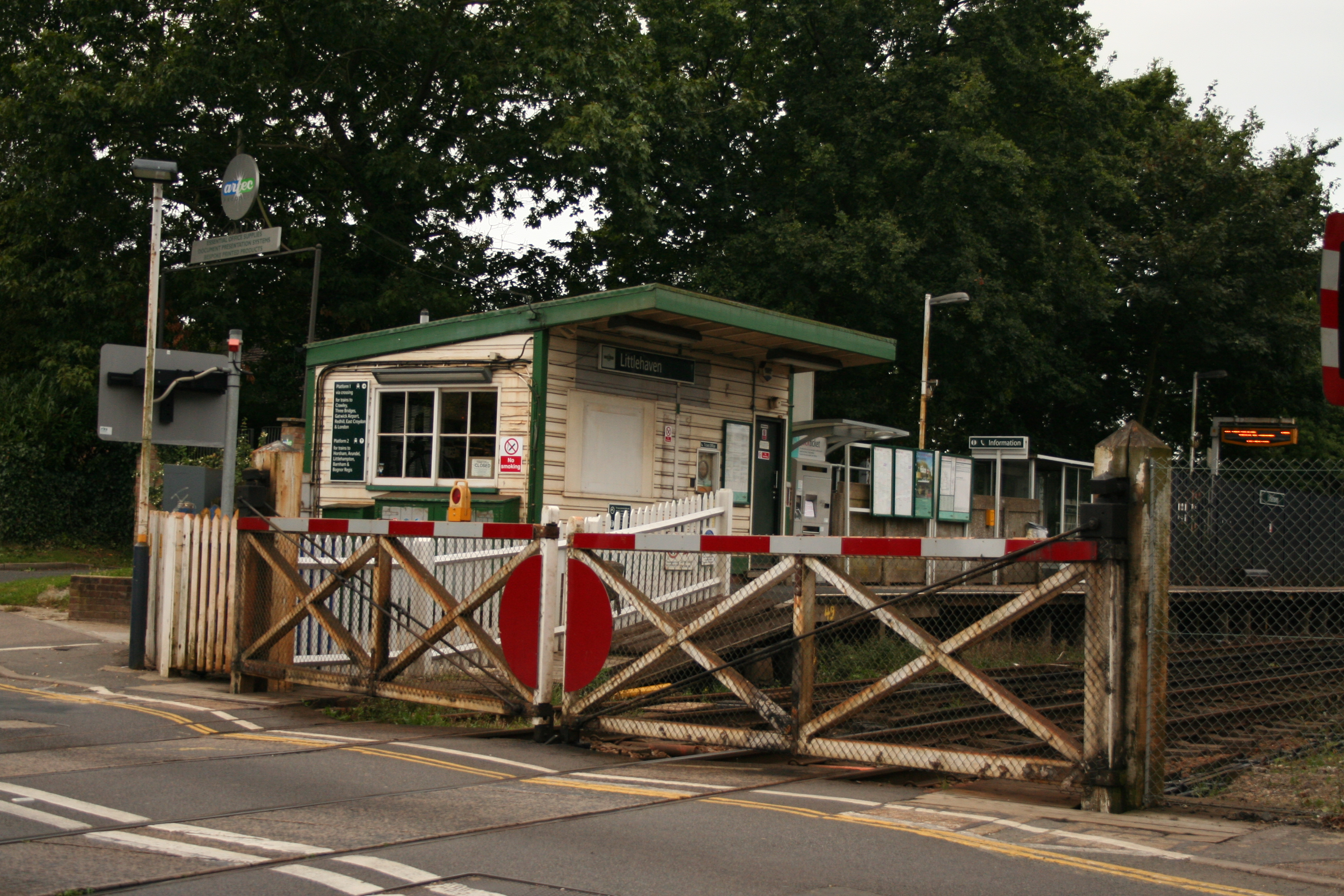

General information
- Location: Littlehaven, Horsham, Horsham, West Sussex; England
- Grid reference: TQ186324
- Managed by: Southern
- Platforms: 2

Other information
- Station code: LVN
- Classification: DfT category E

Key dates
- 1848: Line opened
- 1 June 1907: Station opened (Rusper Road Halt)
- 1 July 1907: Renamed (Littlehaven Crossing Halt)
- 31 December 1907: Renamed (Littlehaven Halt)
- 5 May 1969: Renamed (Littlehaven)

Passengers
- 2020/21: ▼64,950
- 2021/22: ▲0.166 million
- 2022/23: ▲0.227 million
- 2023/24: ▲0.249 million
- 2024/25: ▲0.281 million
Location
Notes
- Passenger statistics from the Office of Rail and Road

Littlehaven railway station serves the areas of Littlehaven, Holbrook and Roffey in the northeast of the town of Horsham, West Sussex, England. It is on the Arun Valley Line, 36 miles 50 chains (58.9 km) down the line from London Bridge, measured via Redhill.

== History ==
The London, Brighton and South Coast Railway opened the first part of the line in 1848. However, the stations at Littlehaven, Roffey Road Halt and nearby Ifield were not opened until 1907; Littlehaven opened as Rusper Road Halt and subsequently changed to Littlehaven Crossing Halt and then Littlehaven Halt all within the first year of service. Similarly, Ifield was initially known as Lyons Crossing Halt. Roffey Road Halt closed in 1937.

The station was completely rebuilt with minimal facilities after traffic decreased.

In 2013, work began to extend the platforms to handle 8 carriages (up from 4), which will reduce delays caused by longer trains blocking the road while stopped.

In 2021, platform 2 was extended to handle 12 carriages, to allow passengers to embark and disembark from the whole train without walking down the train, and to avoid trains blocking the road crossing.

== Level crossing ==
There is a level crossing at the eastern (London) end of the platforms, where the line crosses Rusper Road. The crossing gates were considered for replacement with modern barriers in the early 1990s but as there was a history of late passengers running over the crossing to catch their train it was dismissed. Therefore, the adjacent signal box was staffed 24 hours a day. In October 2012 the level crossing was rebuilt and automatic barriers installed to replace the old fashioned gates. This meant that the crossing operator's job was now redundant, with CCTV used to control the crossing from the Three Bridges signal centre. This upgrade was finally made necessary due to a number of incidents of people driving through the wooden gates when closed, resulting in expensive replacement gates having to be constructed.

== Facilities ==
Facilities include disabled access to both platforms via side ramps from the level crossing, and a ticket office on the Horsham-bound platform. Its opening hours are 0640–1334 Monday to Saturday only. In early 2022, Govia Thameslink Railway intend to close the current ticket office permanently. Ticket vending machines are located on both platforms for customers to purchase tickets. Their sales information highlighted that 96% of pre Covid ticket sales at Littlehaven were purchased via the ticket vending machines.

== Services ==
Off-peak, all services at Littlehaven are operated by Thameslink using Class 700 EMUs.

The typical off-peak service in trains per hour is:

- 2 tph to Peterborough via Redhill
- 2 tph to Horsham

The station is also served by a limited number of Southern services to London Victoria, Bognor Regis, Portsmouth Harbour and London Bridge in the peak hours.

On Sundays, the service is reduced to hourly in each direction and northbound services run to and from Bedford instead of Peterborough.

| Preceding station | National Rail | Following station |
|---|---|---|
| Faygate or Ifield | Thameslink Arun Valley Line | Horsham |
| Faygate or Ifield | Southern: Arun Valley Line; Limited Service | Horsham |
