= Colgate, West Sussex =

Village and parish in West Sussex, England

Coordinates: 51.08148°N 0.24428°W

Colgate
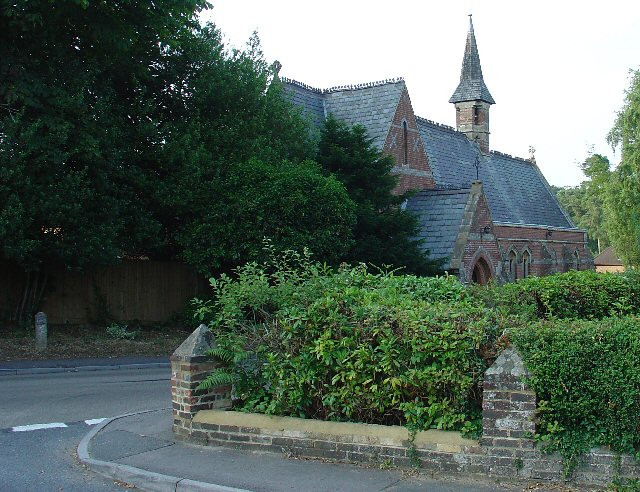

- Location within West Sussex
- Area: 22.44 km^{2} (8.66 sq mi)
- Population: 1,119 2001 Census; 1,087 (2011 Census)
  - Density: 50/km^{2} (130/sq mi)
- OS grid reference: TQ230328
  - London: 29 miles (47 km) N
- Civil parish: Colgate
- District: Horsham
- Shire county: West Sussex
- Region: South East
- Country: England
- Sovereign state: United Kingdom
- Post town: HORSHAM
- Postcode district: RH12
- Dialling code: 01293
- Police: Sussex
- Fire: West Sussex
- Ambulance: South East Coast
- UK Parliament: Horsham

Colgate is a small village and civil parish in the Horsham district of West Sussex, England, about four miles (6 km) north east of Horsham.

A small village, with its origins at the northern edge of St. Leonards Forest, it has no shops or retail facilities. There is a pub "The Dragon", and a church and a small primary school, which in 2012 received a Good report rating from OFSTED. There is a range of architectural styles in the village, with houses present from several different design eras. In the late twentieth century there were some small developments of new houses in the centre of the village.

Nearby settlements include villages of a similar size, architectural design, layout, and administrative status in Faygate and Pease Pottage, and the village is located close to the towns of both Horsham and Crawley.

== History ==
The area is associated with the Wealden iron industry, and Col possibly refers to charcoal burners. Many hammer ponds are still visible within the parish. The Gate is thought to refer to an entrance to the historically much larger St Leonards Forest. The centre of the village was dominated by the Red Cedar Farm and Colgate House. Over the road to the north was Black Hill wood, part of the traditional St Leonards Forest that no longer exists.

In 1887 the ecclesiastical parish, for which the living benefice was a vicarage of a small Early English style Victorian church was subordinated by the larger civil parish of Horsham and Beeding thanks to the local government reorganization of 1885. The population at the time was 485. (Note: "This work is based on data provided through www.VisionofBritain.org.uk and uses historical material which is copyright of the Great Britain Historical GIS Project and the University of Portsmouth".)

Twelve sons of Colgate were killed in World War I. During the Battle of Britain the village was bombed by the Nazis and four people were killed. And a total of seven sons were killed during World War II. Furthermore, five deaths occurred during the conflict among villagers serving in the Civil Defences that would have included the Home Guard. (Note: the fictional Warmington-on-Sea invented by the BBC TV was situated in Sussex.)
