= Horsham railway station =

Railway station in West Sussex, England

Horsham
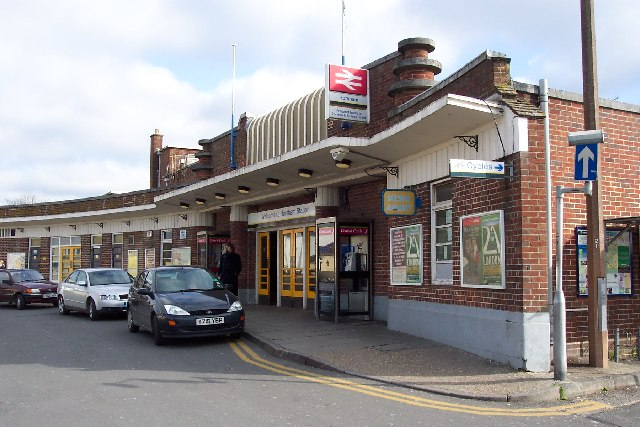

General information
- Location: Horsham, District of Horsham; England
- Coordinates: 51.066°N 0.319°W
- Grid reference: TQ178309
- Managed by: Southern
- Platforms: 4

Other information
- Station code: HRH
- Classification: DfT category C2

History
- Opened: 14 February 1848

Passengers
- 2020/21: ▼0.608 million
- Interchange: ▼26,079
- 2021/22: ▲1.663 million
- Interchange: ▲64,418
- 2022/23: ▲2.094 million
- Interchange: ▲0.105 million
- 2023/24: ▲2.246 million
- Interchange: ▲0.174 million
- 2024/25: ▲2.464 million
- Interchange: ▼76,483
Location
Notes
- Passenger statistics from the Office of Rail and Road

Horsham railway station serves the town of Horsham in West Sussex, England. It is 37 miles 56 chains (60.7 km) down the line from London Bridge, measured via Redhill, on the Arun Valley Line and the Sutton & Mole Valley Lines, and train services are provided by Southern and Thameslink. Services on the Sutton & Mole Valley Line from London Victoria via Dorking terminate here, as do Thameslink services from Peterborough via London Bridge. The other services, which begin at London Victoria divide here and continue into the Arun Valley: Rear portions of trains call at all stations to Bognor Regis, and the front portions travel non-stop Barnham, before then proceeding onto Portsmouth Harbour. Outside the station a small Taxi rank is found. There is also bus links to Crawley and Horsham bus stations.

== History ==
Horsham would have been an important midway point in two of the original proposals for a London to Brighton railway via the Adur valley but in the event Sir John Rennie's proposed direct line through Three Bridges (in east Crawley) and Haywards Heath was given parliamentary approval. As a result, the original Horsham station was the terminus of a single track branch line from Three Bridges opened by the London Brighton and South Coast Railway (LBSCR) in February 1848.

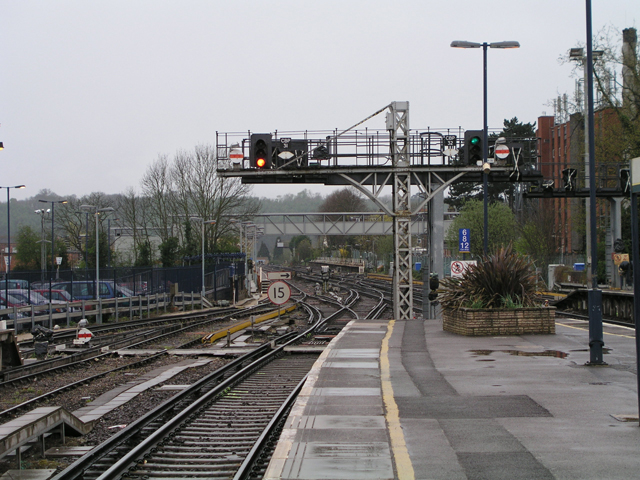
The down line from Horsham railway station.

Between 1859 and 1867, the station was enlarged on several occasions to coincide with the doubling of the branch line from Three Bridges; the extension of the railway from Horsham along the Arun Valley Line; the opening of new lines from Horsham to Shoreham via Steyning and from Christ's Hospital to Guildford. Finally, in 1867, a new route to Dorking, Leatherhead and thence to London, was opened. The station was again partially rebuilt and resignalled, with three signal boxes, in 1875.

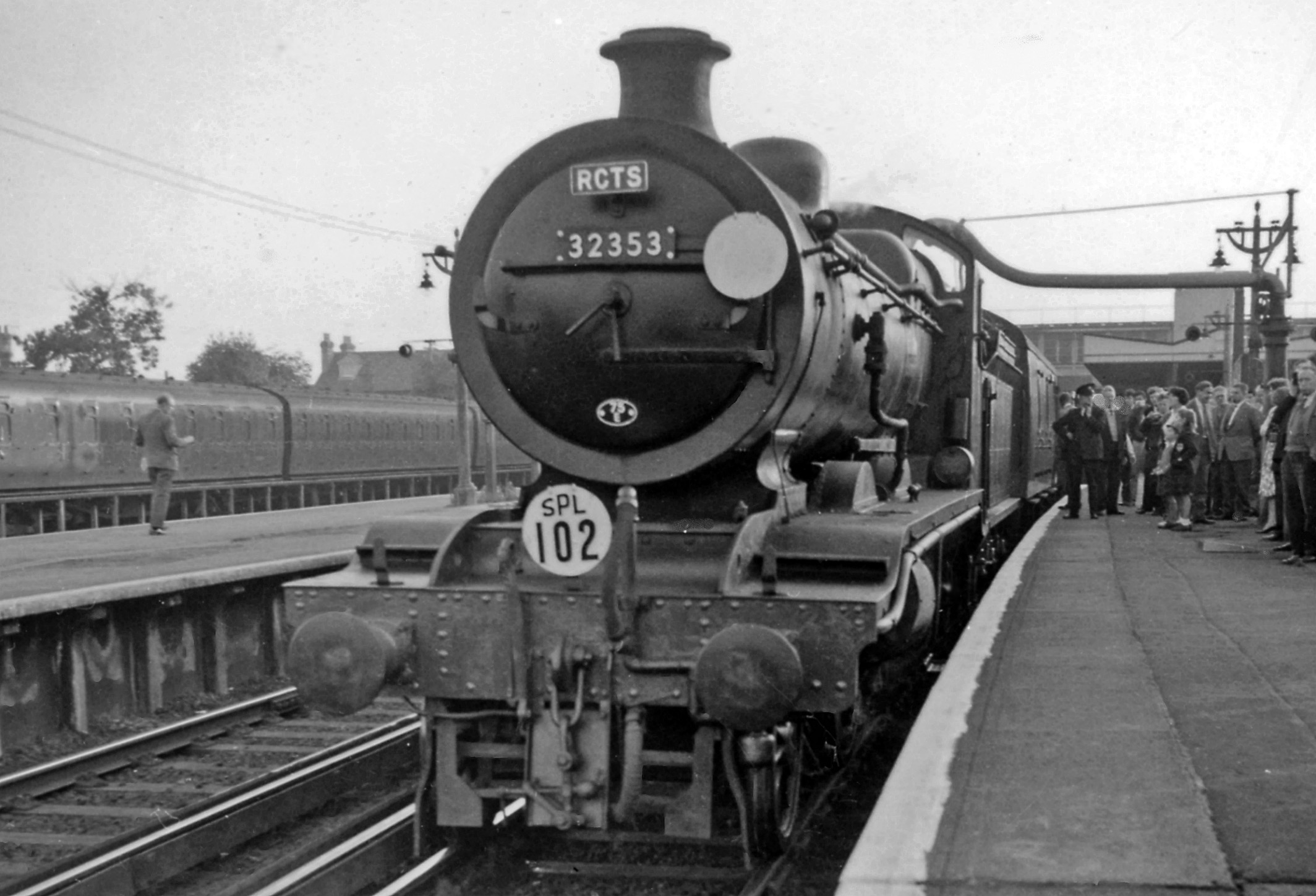
RCTS Sussex Rail Tour in 1962

The present station was built by the Southern Railway in the International Modern Style in 1938 to coincide with the electrification of the line. The building was designed by James Robb Scott and is grade II listed, see external links below. The lines to Guildford and Shoreham both fell victim to the Beeching Axe in the mid-1960s, the former being closed to passengers on 14 June 1965 and the latter on 7 March 1966.

In September 2011, the station frontage was closed to undergo extensive refurbishment work to the main ticket hall. It reopened late in 2012 with a new side entrance, internal lift access, relocated barriers and stairway, a new ticket office, and new information screens. The platforms received a rebuild of the roofing and refurbished waiting rooms. Previously, the building was shared with Henfield Hire, who vacated in order to give the floor space needed to create the new features and new ceiling and lights and so completing a complete reconfiguration of the layout.

== Accidents and incidents ==
- On 9 January 1972, an engineers train overran signals and was in a rear-end collision with an electric multiple unit at the station. Fifteen people were injured. The crew of the engineers train had failed to check their brakes on departure from Three Bridges and thus failed to discover that the isolation cock between the two locomotives had not been opened.

== Services ==
Services at Horsham are operated by Southern and Thameslink using Class 377 and 700 EMUs.

The typical off-peak service in trains per hour is:

- 2 tph to London Victoria via Gatwick Airport
- 1 tph to London Victoria via Epsom and Sutton
- 2 tph to Peterborough via Gatwick Airport, Redhill and London Bridge
- 2 tph to Portsmouth Harbour (non-stop to Barnham)
- 2 tph to Bognor Regis (stopping)

In the peak hours, the station is served by a single service between London Bridge and Bognor Regis (via Littlehampton).

On Sundays, the service to London Victoria via Epsom does not run. In addition, the Thameslink service is reduced to 1 tph and runs to Bedford, instead of Peterborough. Mainline services are reduced to 1 tph and trains divide at Barnham instead of at Horsham.

Preceding station	National Rail	Following station
Crawley	Southern Arun Valley line	Christ's Hospital or Barnham
Littlehaven Limited service	Southern Arun Valley line	Christ's Hospital or Barnham
Littlehaven	Thameslink Arun Valley line	Terminus
Warnham	Southern Sutton and Mole Valley lines Monday-Saturday only	Terminus
	Disused railways	
Terminus	British Rail Southern Region Cranleigh line	Christ's Hospital
Terminus	British Rail Southern Region Steyning Line	Christ's Hospital

== Motive power depot ==
A small wooden motive power depot was built at the station in 1876. This was replaced by a brick-built ten-road semi-roundhouse together with a 46 ft (14 metre) turntable in 1880. This in turn was extended with a further eight roads in 1900. In 1927 the Southern Railway installed a 55 ft (16.8 metre) turntable. This depot was closed in 1964.

== Signalbox ==
Nearby is the type 13 signal box dating from 1938, which is also Grade II listed. It closed in 2005 when its controls were transferred to Three Bridges Integrated Electronic Control Centre.

== New services ==
New services from Horsham have been introduced to destinations north of central London from December 2018. The new timetable was originally proposed in May 2014, with services between Horsham and London Bridge transferred from Southern to Thameslink, and extended to Peterborough via St Pancras International, Stevenage and St Neots.
