= Faygate railway station =

Railway station in West Sussex, England

Coordinates: 51.096°N 0.263°W

Faygate
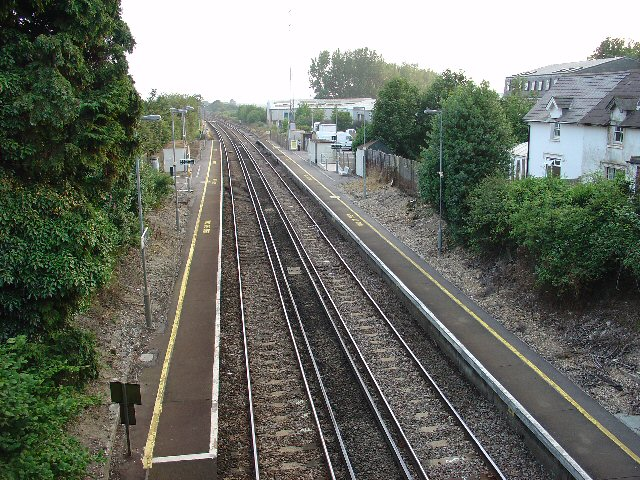

General information
- Location: Faygate, Horsham; England
- Grid reference: TQ217343
- Manager: Southern
- Platforms: 2

Other information
- Station code: FGT
- Classification: DfT category F2

History
- Opened: 14 February 1848

Passengers
- 2021/22: ▲3,886
- 2022/23: ▲5,934
- 2023/24: ▲7,756
- 2024/25: ▲9,478
- 2025/26: ▼9,140
Location
Notes
- Passenger statistics from the Office of Rail and Road

Faygate Station is located on the Arun Valley Line, between Littlehaven and Ifield, 34 miles 28 chains (55.3 km) down the line from London Bridge, measured via Redhill. It serves the small village of Faygate and the Faygate Business Centre, situated on the A264 in the countryside between Crawley and Horsham. It is one of the least used stations in West Sussex.

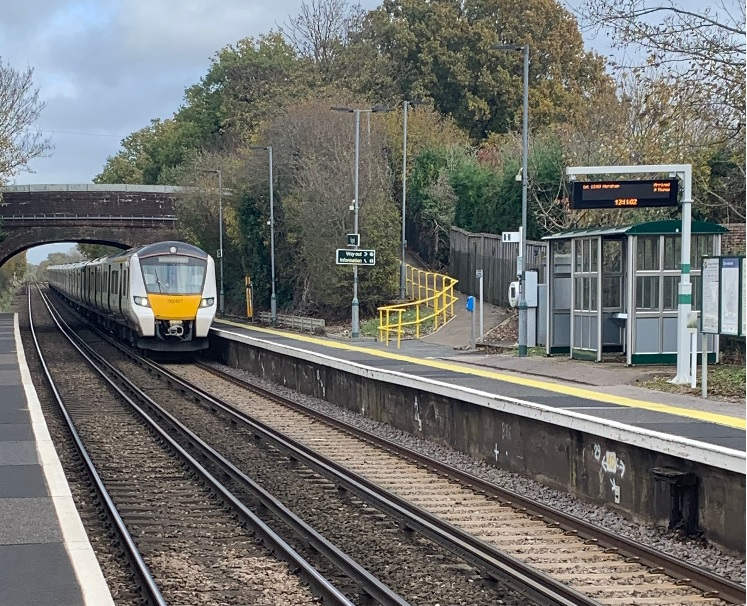
Faygate station, West Sussex November 11 2022

== History ==
The single track branch line of the London Brighton and South Coast Railway between Three Bridges and Horsham was opened 14 February 1848. Crawley and Faygate were intermediate stations each with two platforms to enable trains to pass. The line was doubled throughout during 1862 to coincide with the extension of the railway from Horsham to the Arun Valley.

== Facilities ==
The station is unstaffed and facilities are limited. Tickets can be purchased from the self-service ticket machine and there are shelters and modern help points on both platforms. There is also a small car park at the station, operated by APCOA.

Step-free access is available to both the platforms at the station.

== Services ==
Services at Faygate are operated by Southern and Thameslink using Class 377 and Class 700 EMUs respectively.

Services at the station are limited and run on weekdays only. Services run mostly during the peak hours with an additional service calling at around midday.

As of May 2022, there are a total of 12 southbound trains, 11 of which are operated by Thameslink and run to Horsham and 1 is operated by Southern and extends to Portsmouth Harbour. There are 10 northbound trains that are all operated by Thameslink of which 9 run to Peterborough, with a single early morning service to Bedford via London Bridge.

No services stop at the station on weekends.

| Preceding station | National Rail | Following station |
|---|---|---|
| Ifield | Thameslink Arun Valley Line Monday-Friday only | Littlehaven |
| Ifield | Southern Arun Valley Line Limited Service | Littlehaven |

== Bus connections ==
No regular buses directly serve the station although the Metrobus routes 23 and 200 stop at the Faygate roundabout, approximately 10 minutes walking distance from the station.

These services provide connections to Crawley, Gatwick Airport, Horsham and Worthing.
