= Arun Valley line =

Railway line in the UK

Coordinates: 51.117°N 0.161°E

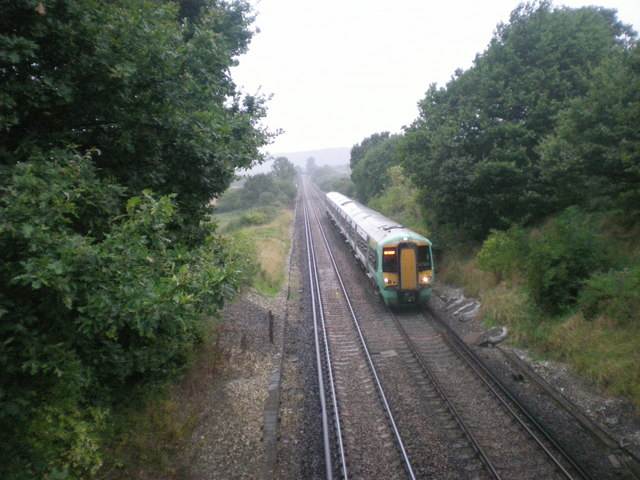
- Southern class 377 train bound for Victoria passes under the A29 road bridge south of Pulborough in West Sussex in 2009

Overview
- Status: Operational
- Owner: Network Rail
- Locale: South East England
- Termini: Littlehampton; Three Bridges
- Stations: 11

Service
- Type: Heavy rail
- System: National Rail
- Operator(s): Southern; Thameslink
- Rolling stock: Class 377; Class 700

History
- Opened: 1863

Technical
- Line length: 30 mi 46 ch (49.2 km) (Between Three Bridges and Arundel junctions)
- Number of tracks: 2
- Track gauge: 4 ft 8 1/2 in (1,435 mm) standard gauge
- Electrification: 750 V DC third rail
Route map
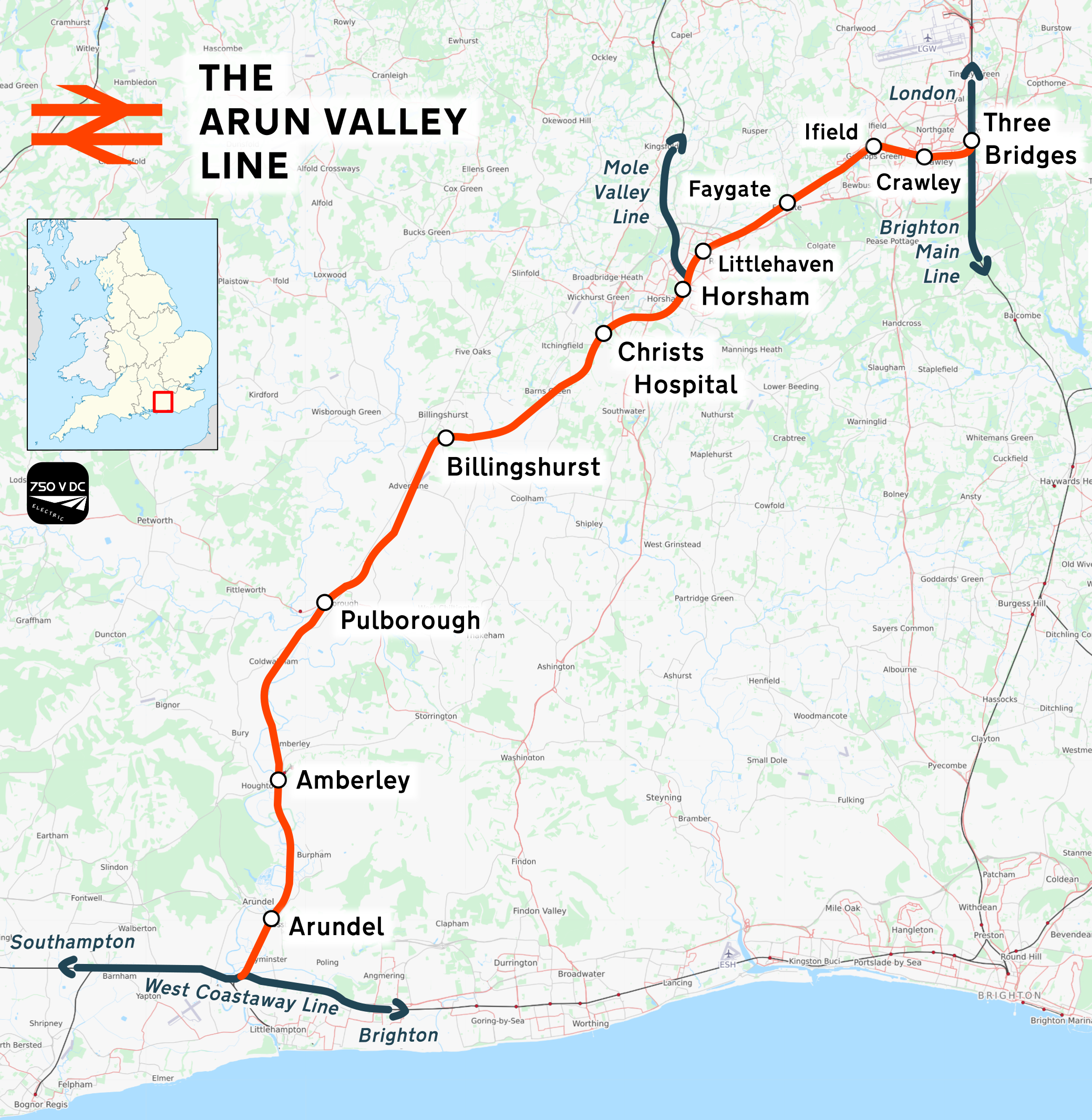
(Click to expand)

The Arun Valley line, also known as the Mid Sussex line, is part of the Southern- and Thameslink-operated railway services. For the initial part of the route trains follow the Brighton Main Line, and at a junction south of Three Bridges the route turns westwards. It then runs via Crawley, Horsham (where there is a junction with the Portsmouth Line) and Arundel, before meeting the West Coastway line at Arundel Junction. Trains on the Arun Valley line then mostly proceed to either Bognor Regis or Portsmouth Harbour, with an additional peak hour service which first proceeds to Littlehampton, and subsequently to Bognor Regis.

Many stations on this line retain the short platforms which were originally built, not being extended by the Southern Railway when the line was modernised in the 1930s, nor by any subsequent operators. This causes operational difficulties to this day, which require frequent platform and on-train announcements with longer trains, telling passengers they must travel in the correct part of the train.

== History ==
The line was opened in three stages by the London, Brighton and South Coast Railway (LB&SCR) between 1848 and 1863, creating what was then known as Mid-Sussex route to Portsmouth.

=== Three Bridges–Horsham ===
A single track branch line was opened on 14 February 1848, with passing places at the intermediate stations at Crawley and Faygate. The line was doubled throughout in 1862. The stations now at Ifield and Littlehaven were not opened with the line, both being opened on 1 June 1907: Ifield as Lyons Crossing Halt and Littlehaven as Rusper Road Halt; both serving the outskirts of their nearby towns. An additional stop was opened at Roffey Road Halt; however this station was closed in 1937, as the land next to the station had remained undeveloped.

=== Horsham–Pulborough ===
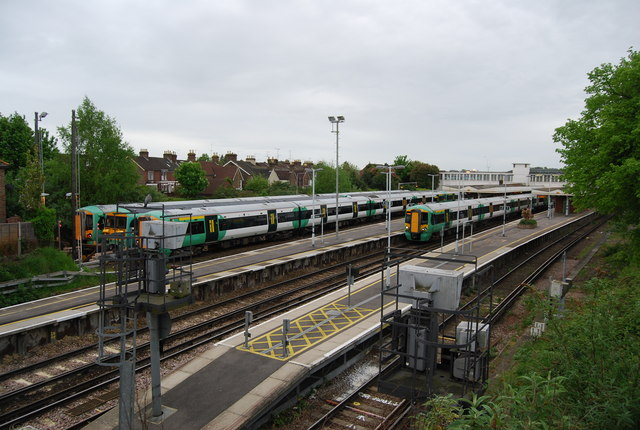
Horsham railway station

The Midhurst Railways line from Horsham to Pulborough, Petworth and Midhurst was opened on 10 October 1859. The section from Hardham Junction to Midhurst was closed between 1964 and 1966. The Steyning Line from Horsham to Shoreham by Sea was opened on 1 July 1861 branching off at Itchingfield Junction south of Horsham. It closed in 1966. The line from Christs Hospital to Guildford opened in 1865 and closed in 1965.

=== Pulborough–Arundel ===
The line between Hardham Junction south of Pulborough, and Arundel Junction on the coast line via Arundel was finally opened on 3 August 1863 creating a through route to Portsmouth.

Originally, the main LB&SCR route from London to Portsmouth used the Portsmouth line to reach Horsham. However, with the increase in demand at Gatwick Airport, the mainline services were re-routed in 1978 to serve the airport and then travel via Three Bridges.

=== Electrification ===
The line was electrified using the (750 V DC third rail) system by the Southern Railway in 1938 as part of the proposals to electrify the lines from London to Portsmouth. This originally only covered the section from Horsham to Littlehampton and Barnham, as the main line was the line through Dorking and Sutton, as opposed to the line to Three Bridges, but plans were extended to electrify the "branch" as well in the same year.

Electric services were provided by electric multiple units. For most of the rest of the twentieth century, an hourly express service was provided which joined/divided at Barnham, with 4 or 8 coaches continuing to Bognor and 4 to Portsmouth Harbour. This called at Arundel, Pulborough and latterly Billingshurst, going via Sutton and Dorking. An all-stations stopping service also ran hourly via Crawley to Bognor Regis, usually via Littlehampton.

=== Later work ===
Two bridges on the line, The Black Rabbit Bridge (just north of Arundel) and the Peppering Bridge (a few hundred yards further on) were replaced during the August Bank Holiday weekend of 2009. The line was completely closed to traffic during these major engineering works and a replacement bus service served stations between Arundel and Pulborough. As the two-week Arundel Festival was drawing to a close over the weekend, Southern maintained a service into the station from the West Coastway Line from Bognor Regis via Barnham and Ford, and a reversal at Littlehampton.

== Services ==
Between Horsham and Three Bridges, trains run 4 times per hour: 2 fast southern trains stopping only at crawley and 2 slower Thameslink trains calling at Littlehaven, Faygate (Peak time only), Ifield and Crawley. South of Horsham, 2 fast services per hour run Non-stop to Barnham and then on to Portsmouth. 2 trains per hour stop at all station to Bognor Regis This is the most frequent service on the route since the late 1970s. Thameslink trains to Horsham began in the late 2010s.

Down-line services: Both divide at Horsham, the train closest to the hour has a front portion which is fast to Barnham then stopping to Portsmouth Harbour. The rear portion calls at all stations to Bognor Regis. The 30-minutes-past train's front portion again runs fast to Barnham then is semi-fast to Portsmouth Harbour. The rear section again calls all stations to Bognor Regis.

Up-line service: Again two trains an hour, both services attach at Horsham. The Bognor Regis section always arrives first unless there is disruption and then a section from Portsmouth Harbour arrives. Once the train has attached it runs semi fast to London Victoria via the Horsham Branch Line (Horsham to Three Bridges) and the fast Quarry Line. Each of the up services arrive with normally a 10-minute interchange for the Thameslink services to Peterborough via Redhill and London Bridge and the one closest the hour for the Mole Valley service towards London Victoria via Dorking.

Typical off-peak journey times from London Victoria (via Redhill and Gatwick Airport)

Based in December 2006 timetable, prior to the introduction of the train split at Horsham and the non-stop services Horsham to Barnham. In 2016 most of the off-peak fast services reached Barnham in 80–81 minutes and Chichester in 88; peak-hour services were slightly slower.
Stations in italics are served by through trains but are not part of the Arun Valley line.

Destination	Frequency	Stopping service	Semi-fast service	Change for
Clapham Junction	2 train/h	6 minutes	6 minutes	London Waterloo, Putney, Richmond, Twickenham, Wimbledon, New Malden, Woking, Guildford, Winchester, Salisbury, Reading, Exeter, Willesden Junction, Watford Junction, Milton Keynes
East Croydon	2 train/h	16 minutes	16 minutes	Tramlink, London Bridge, Caterham, Tattenham Corner
Redhill	2 train/h	29 minutes	29 minutes	Reigate, Dorking, Guildford, Wokingham, Reading, Edenbridge, Tonbridge
Gatwick Airport	2 train/h	39 minutes	37 minutes	Hove, Worthing, Lewes, Eastbourne, Bexhill, Hastings, Reading, Guildford
Three Bridges	2 train/h	44 minutes	42 minutes	Haywards Heath, Burgess Hill, Brighton, London Bridge, London St Pancras, St Albans, Luton Airport, Luton, Bedford
Crawley	2 train/h	47 minutes	45 minutes	
Horsham	2 train/h	56 minutes	54 minutes	Dorking, Leatherhead, Epsom, Sutton
Christs Hospital	2 train/h	1 hour		
Billingshurst	2 train/h	1 hour 6 minutes	1 hour 2 minutes	
Pulborough	2 train/h	1 hour 13 minutes	1 hour 8 minutes	
Amberley	2 train/h	1 hour 20 minutes		
Arundel	2 train/h	1 hour 25 minutes	1 hour 17 minutes	
Ford	2 train/h	1 hour 30 minutes	1 hour 22 minutes	Littlehampton, Worthing, Brighton
Barnham	2 train/h	1 hour 34 minutes	1 hour 28 minutes	Bognor Regis, and also Littlehampton, Worthing, Brighton (Ford has reduced service)
Chichester	2 train/h	1 hour 46 minutes	1 hour 36 minutes	Havant, Portsmouth Harbour, Southampton Central

Typical off-peak journey times from London Bridge (via Redhill and Gatwick Airport)

Based in December 2006 timetable. Stations in italics are served by through trains but are not part of the Arun Valley line. There are two trains per hour on this route. Some stations between London Bridge and Gatwick Airport have been omitted. Faygate is served during peak hours only.

Destination	Off-peak journey time	Change for
East Croydon	16 minutes	Tramlink, London Victoria, Caterham, Oxted
Redhill	36 minutes	Reigate, Guildford, Edenbridge, Tonbridge
Gatwick Airport	50 minutes	Flights from Gatwick Airport
Three Bridges	56 minutes	Haywards Heath, Brighton, Eastbourne, Worthing
Crawley	1 hour	
Ifield	1 hour 3 minutes	
Littlehaven	1 hour 9 minutes	
Horsham	1 hour 14 minutes	Dorking, Leatherhead, Epsom, Sutton
