= Leet (surname) =

Leet is a surname. Notable people with the surname include:

- Isaac Leet (1801–1844), American politician
- Marjorie Leet (1904–1994), American actress
- Mildred Robbins Leet (1922–2011), American entrepreneur and philanthropist
- Norman Leet (born 1962), English footballer
- William Leet (1833–1898), Irish Victoria Cross recipient
- William A. Leet, American farmer

== See also ==
- Leet (disambiguation)
- Leete (disambiguation)
