= Arundel railway station =

Railway station in West Sussex, England

Coordinates: 50.848°N 0.546°W

Arundel
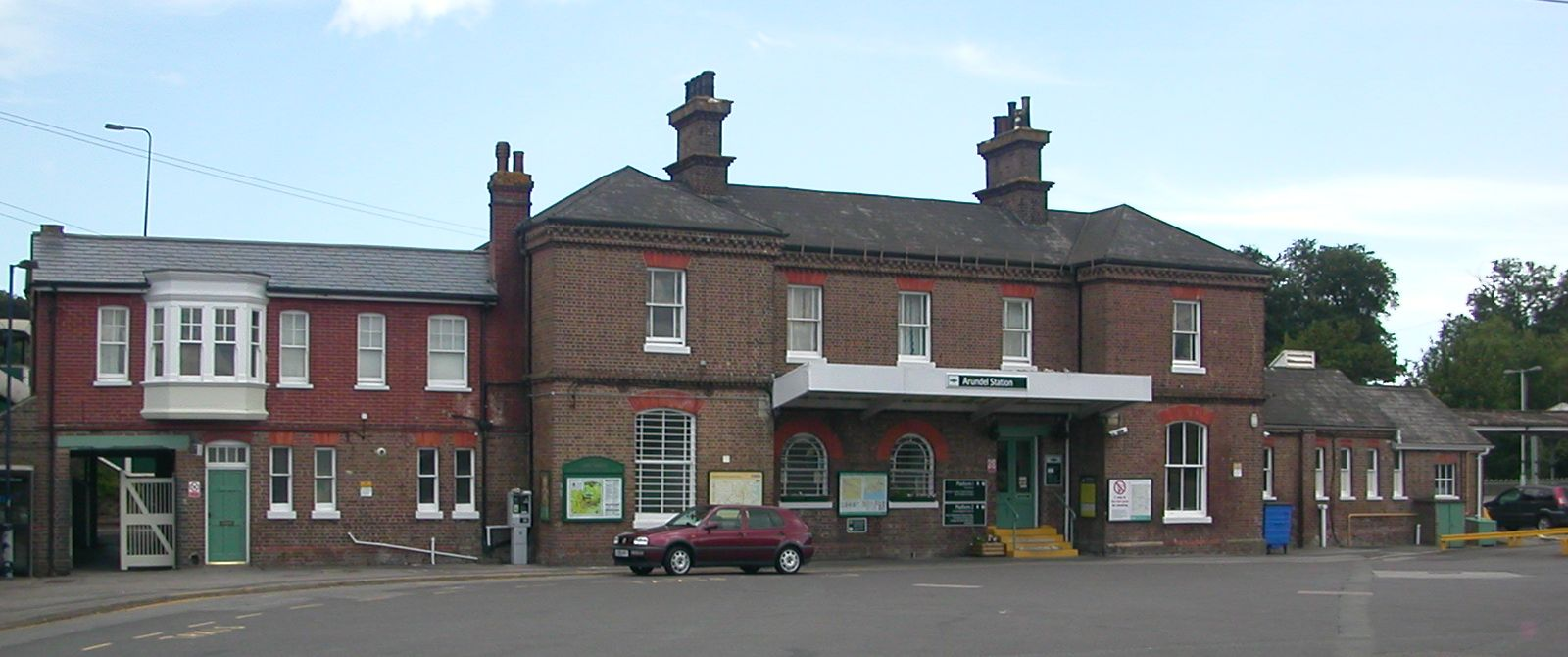

General information
- Location: Arundel, Arun, England
- Grid reference: TQ024063
- Manager: Southern
- Platforms: 2 (was 3)

Other information
- Station code: ARU
- Classification: DfT category E

History
- Opened: 3 August 1863

Passengers
- 2020/21: ▼85,660
- 2021/22: ▲0.209 million
- 2022/23: ▲0.258 million
- 2023/24: ▲0.280 million
- 2024/25: ▲0.309 million
Location
Notes
- Passenger statistics from the Office of Rail and Road

Arundel railway station serves the market town of Arundel, in West Sussex, England. It lies on the eastern side of the town, about 550 yards (500 m) from the High Street, across the River Arun. It is 58 miles 28 chains (58.4 mi; 93.9 km) down the line from London Bridge, via Redhill.

It is situated on the A27 and is the transport hub for many settlements in the Arun District area, including Angmering and Wick, for passengers joining London-bound services to the capital and Gatwick Airport. The station can accommodate 12 coach trains and is one of the few stations along the Arun Valley route that does not have coach restriction announcements.

== History ==
Opened by the London, Brighton and South Coast Railway, as part of the Mid-Sussex railways, it became part of the Southern Railway during the Grouping of 1923. The station then passed on to the Southern Region of British Railways upon nationalisation in 1948.

Until 1978, most trains from Arundel to London were routed via Dorking and Sutton, which was slightly quicker than today's workings. However, since 1978, services now serve Gatwick Airport and East Croydon; passengers for Dorking and Sutton require a change of train at Horsham.

When sectorisation was introduced in the 1980s, the station was served by Network SouthEast until the privatisation of British Rail.

The current use of the station is for predominantly London or Gatwick Airport bound passenger traffic. On Mondays to Saturdays, most southbound trains currently only serve Ford, Barnham and Bognor Regis. Passengers for Chichester, Portsmouth Harbour and Southampton Central, or any stations towards Brighton have a change of train at Ford or Barnham. Passengers for Littlehampton also usually have to change at Ford, with the exception of a single peak hour service to Bognor Regis which runs via Littlehampton.

== Services ==
All services at Arundel are operated by Southern, using Class 377 electric multiple units; the typical off-peak service in trains per hour (tph) is:

- 2 tph to London Victoria, via Gatwick Airport
- 2 tph to Bognor Regis.

At peak hours, the station is served by a single service between Bognor Regis, Littlehampton and London Bridge. On Sundays, there is an hourly service but southbound trains divide at Barnham, with an additional portion of the train travelling to Portsmouth Harbour.

Preceding station	National Rail	Following station
Amberley	Southern; Arun Valley line	Ford
Pulborough	Southern; West Coastway line Littlehampton Branch Peak hours only	Littlehampton

== Onward connections ==
The station is served by Stagecoach South's bus route 9 that operates between Arundel, Littlehampton, Worthing and Shoreham; bus stops are outside the station on the A27.

== Gallery ==
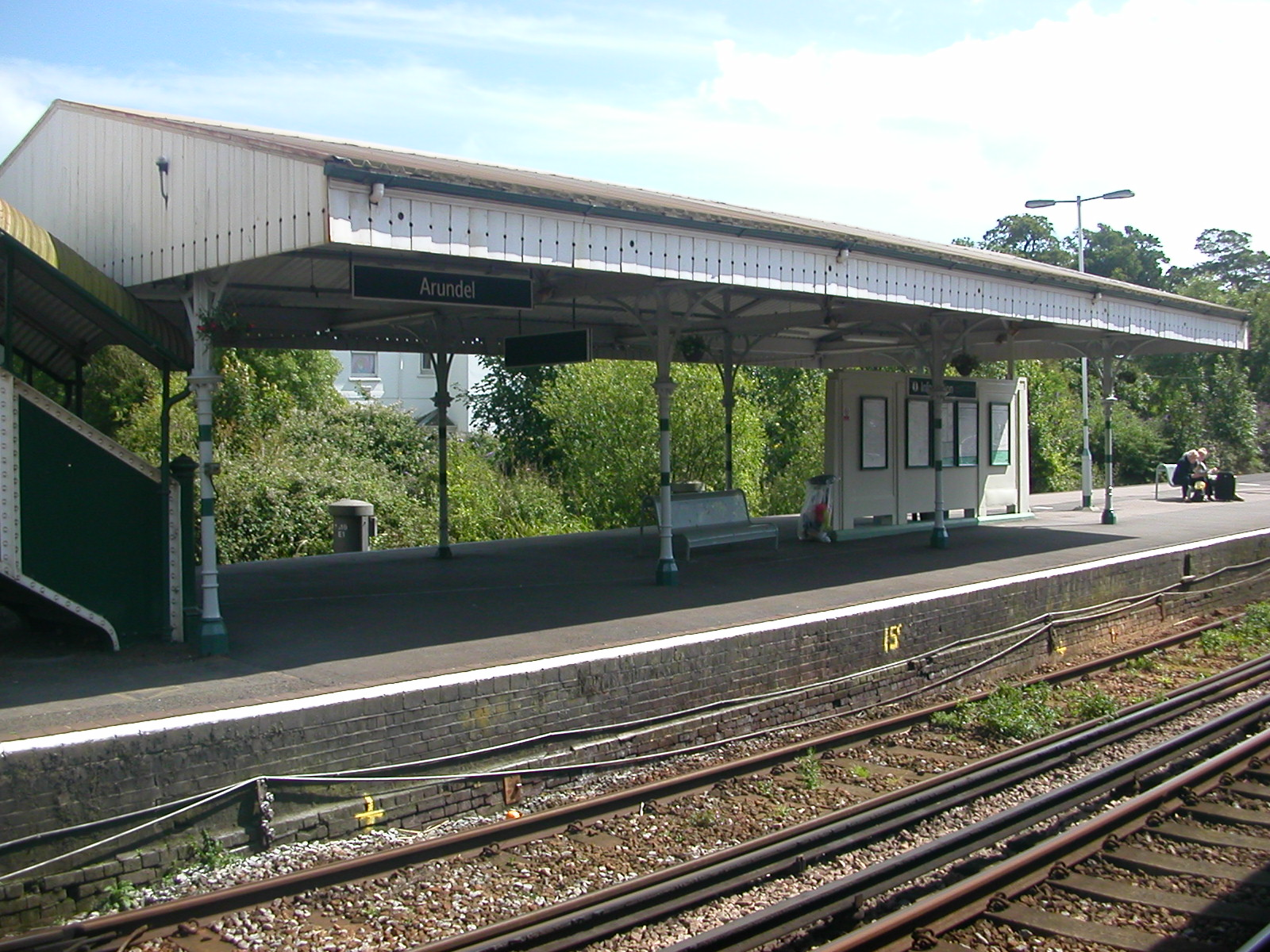
Waiting area at the northern end of the island platform

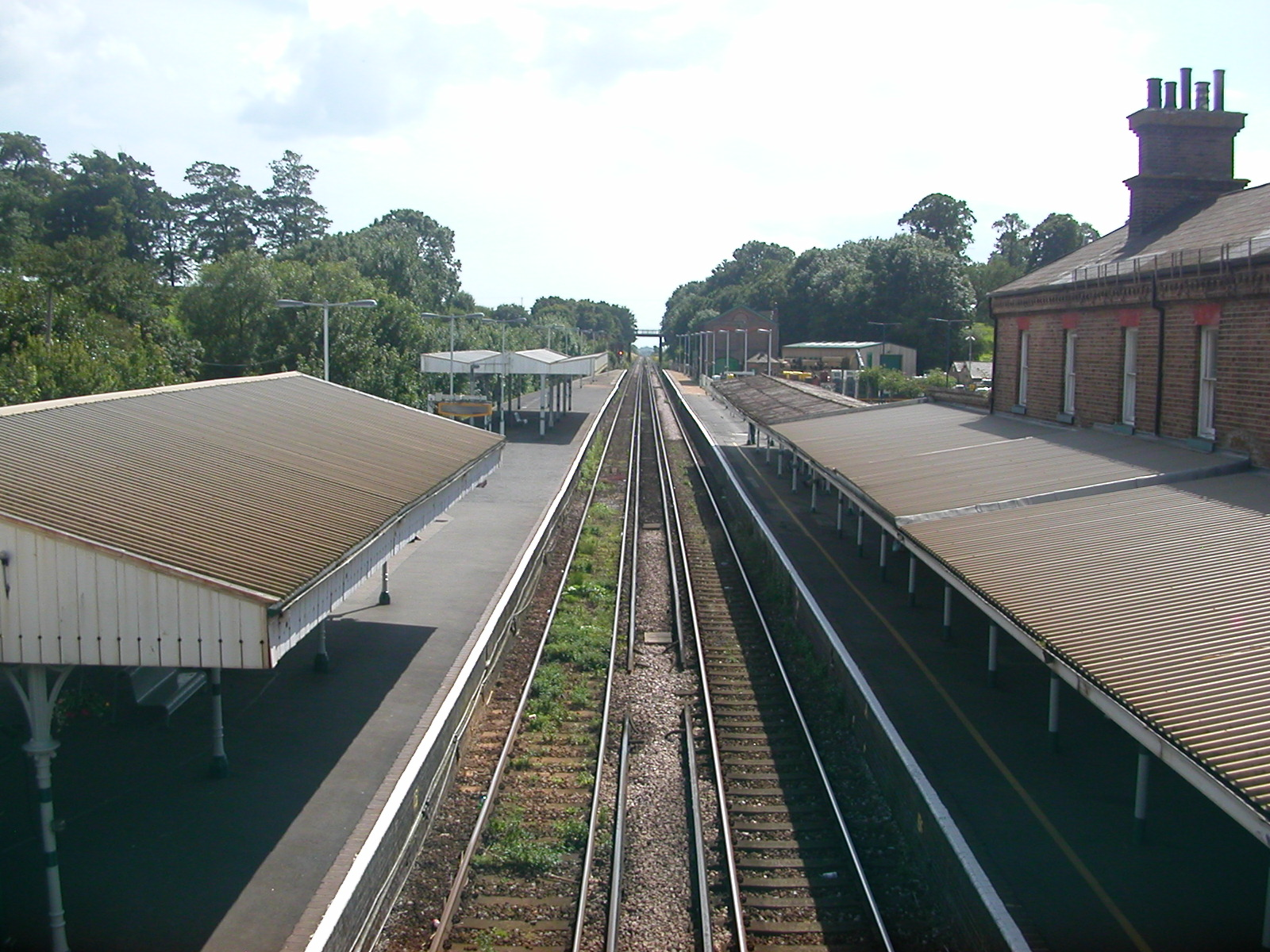
Southbound view from the station footbridge

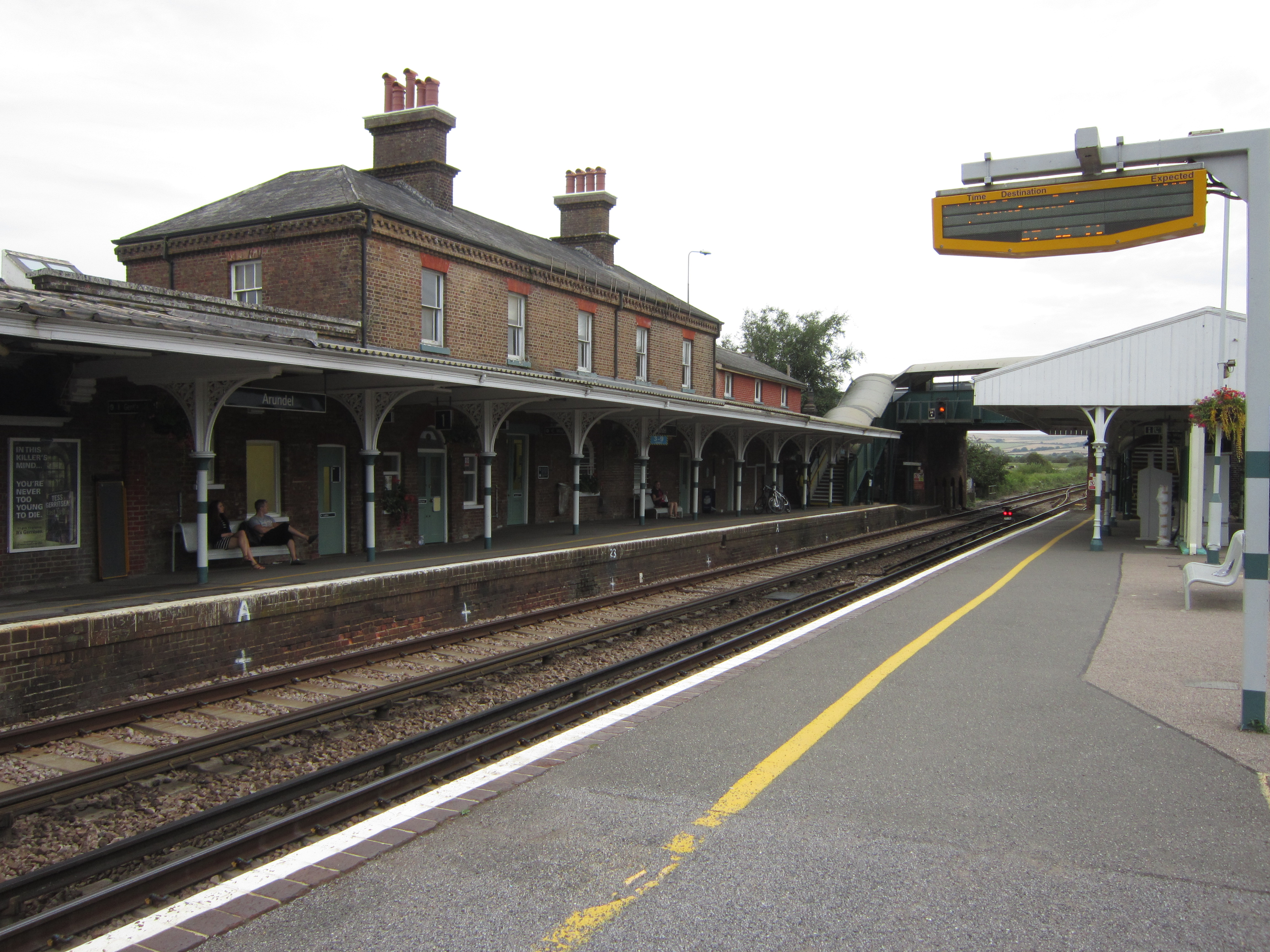
Northbound view from the island platform.
