= Amberley railway station =

Railway station in West Sussex, England

Coordinates: 50.897°N 0.542°W

Amberley
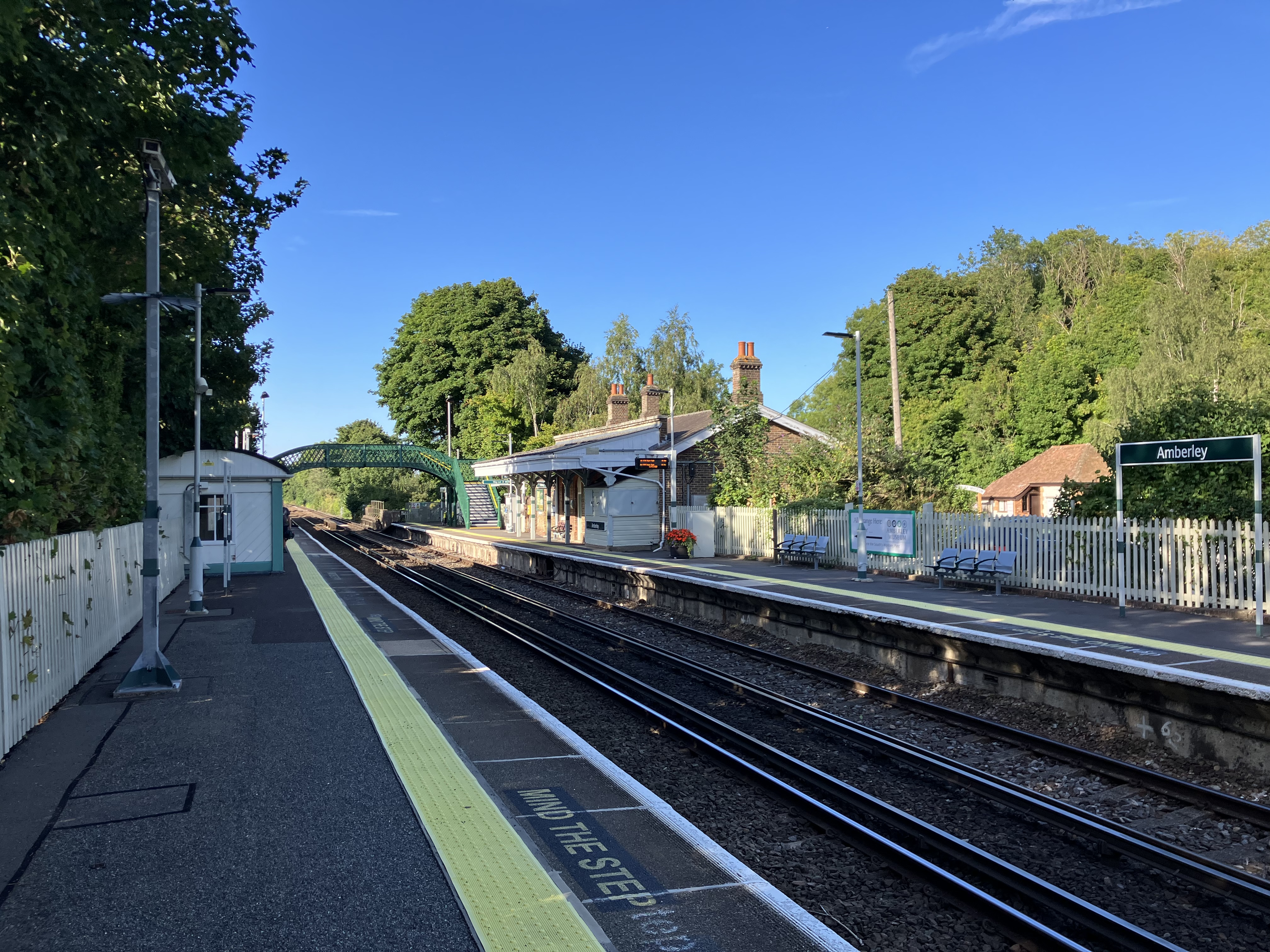
- The platforms at Amberley, looking north

General information
- Location: Amberley, Horsham; England
- Grid reference: TQ026118
- Manager: Southern
- Platforms: 2

Other information
- Station code: AMY
- Classification: DfT category F2

History
- Opened: 3 August 1863
- Original company: London, Brighton and South Coast Railway
- Pre-grouping: London, Brighton and South Coast Railway
- Post-grouping: Southern Railway (UK)

Passengers
- 2020/21: ▼17,084
- 2021/22: ▲44,318
- 2022/23: ▲60,580
- 2023/24: ▲70,836
- 2024/25: ▲89,218
Location
Notes
- Passenger statistics from the Office of Rail and Road

Amberley railway station is a railway station in West Sussex, England. It serves the village of Amberley, about half a mile away, and was opened by the London, Brighton and South Coast Railway. The Amberley Working Museum – a museum of industry – is accessed from the former station goods yard.

It is 54 miles 62 chains (88.2 km) down the line from London Bridge via Redhill on the Arun Valley Line.

== History ==
Opened by the London, Brighton and South Coast Railway on 3 August 1863, it became part of the Southern Railway during the Grouping of 1923.

The station had two platforms connected with a footbridge, a signalbox (now closed) is situated on Platform 2, under the station canopy. There was a goods yard with connections into a "chalk and lime works" to the south of the station and "Amberley Lime Works", now the Amberley Museum and Heritage Centre to the north east. The goods yard was equipped to take most sorts of goods including live stock and had a 1-ton crane.

The station was host to a Southern Railway camping coach from 1938 to 1939.

The station then passed on to the Southern Region of British Railways on nationalisation in 1948. Two camping coaches were positioned here by the Southern Region from 1954 to 1961, the coaches were replaced by two Pullman camping coaches which stayed until 1967.

When Sectorisation was introduced in the 1980s, the station was served by Network SouthEast until the Privatisation of British Railways.

== Services ==
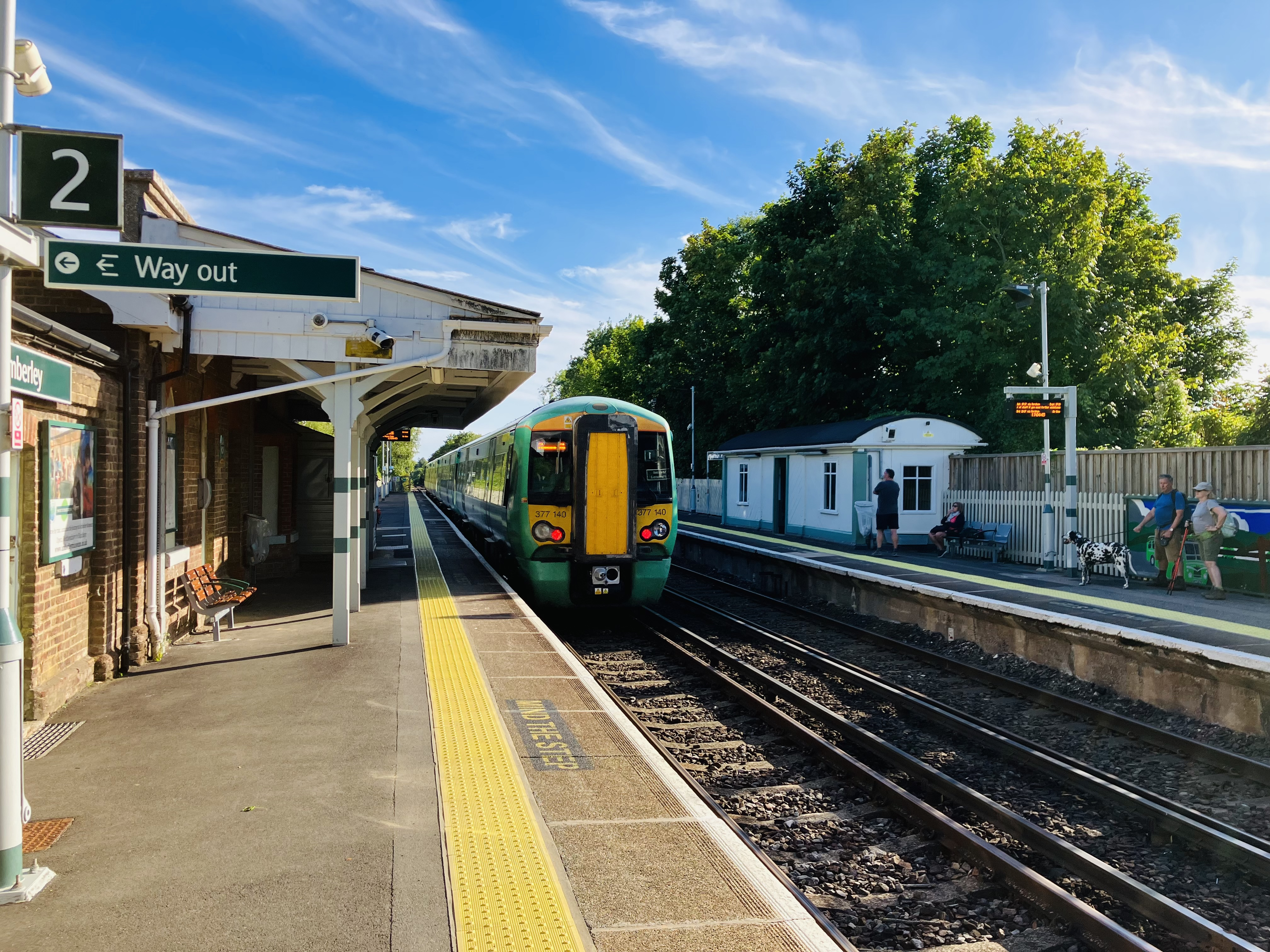
377140 departing Amberley with a Southern service bound for Bognor Regis

All services at Amberley are operated by Southern using Class 377 EMUs.

The typical off-peak service in trains per hour is:

- 2 tph to London Victoria via Gatwick Airport
- 2 tph to Bognor Regis

On Sundays, there is an hourly service but southbound trains divide at Barnham, with an additional portion of the train travelling to Portsmouth Harbour.

Preceding station	National Rail	Following station
Pulborough	Southern Arun Valley Line	Arundel

== Bibliography ==
- McRae, Andrew (1997). British Railway Camping Coach Holidays: The 1930s & British Railways (London Midland Region). Vol. Scenes from the Past: 30 (Part One). Foxline. ISBN 1-870119-48-7.
- McRae, Andrew (1998). British Railways Camping Coach Holidays: A Tour of Britain in the 1950s and 1960s. Vol. Scenes from the Past: 30 (Part Two). Foxline. ISBN 1-870119-53-3.
- Quick, Michael (2022) [2001]. Railway passenger stations in Great Britain: a chronology (PDF). version 5.04. Railway & Canal Historical Society. Archived from the original (PDF) on 25 November 2022.
- The Railway Clearing House (1970) [1904]. The Railway Clearing House Handbook of Railway Stations 1904 (1970 D&C Reprint ed.). Newton Abbot: David & Charles Reprints. ISBN 0-7153-5120-6.
