= Lit =

Lit or LIT may refer to:

== Arts and media ==
=== Music ===
- Lit (band), an American alt-rock band
  - Lit (album), their 2004 album
- "Lit" (Koda Kumi song), 2018
- "Lit" (Steve Aoki and Yellow Claw song), 2017
- "Lit" (Wiz Khalifa song), 2016
- "Lit", a 2019 song by Oneus
- Lit, a 2020 EP album by Lay Zhang

=== Other media ===
- LIT (video game), a 2009 horror puzzler
- LIT Verlag, a German academic publisher
- Literature (clipped to lit)
- &lit, a form of cryptic crossword clue
- .lit, in Microsoft Reader e-book filenames

== Education ==
- LIT journal, periodical of Lambda Iota Tau (1953–2017)
- Lamar Institute of Technology, Texas, US
- Laxminarayan Institute of Technology, Nagpur, India
- Lee-Ming Institute of Technology, Taiwan
- Limerick Institute of Technology, Ireland
- Linz Institute of Technology, Austria
- Literature

== Language ==
- lit, Generation Z slang for 'cool'
- lit., a literal translation (within a gloss)
- Lit., Italian lira, a currency (1861–2002)
- Lithuanian language (ISO 639-2:lit)

== Name ==
- Hy Lit (1934-2007), American disc jockey and television personality

== Places ==
- Lit, Bhulath, India
- Lit, Sweden
- Lit Lounge, a nightclub in New York, US
- Lithuania (UNDP country code:LIT)
- Clinton National Airport, Arkansas, US (IATA:LIT)
- Littlehampton railway station, England (station code:LIT)

== Other uses ==
- Lit Brothers, an American department store chain in Philadelphia
- Lit Motors, an American cabin motorcycle developer
- Linear ion trap, in mass spectrometry

== See also ==
- Litt, a surname
- Leet (disambiguation)
- Lite (disambiguation)
- lit may emit a small source of light
