= Ford railway station =

Railway station in West Sussex, England

Coordinates: 50°49′46″N 0°34′43″W

Ford
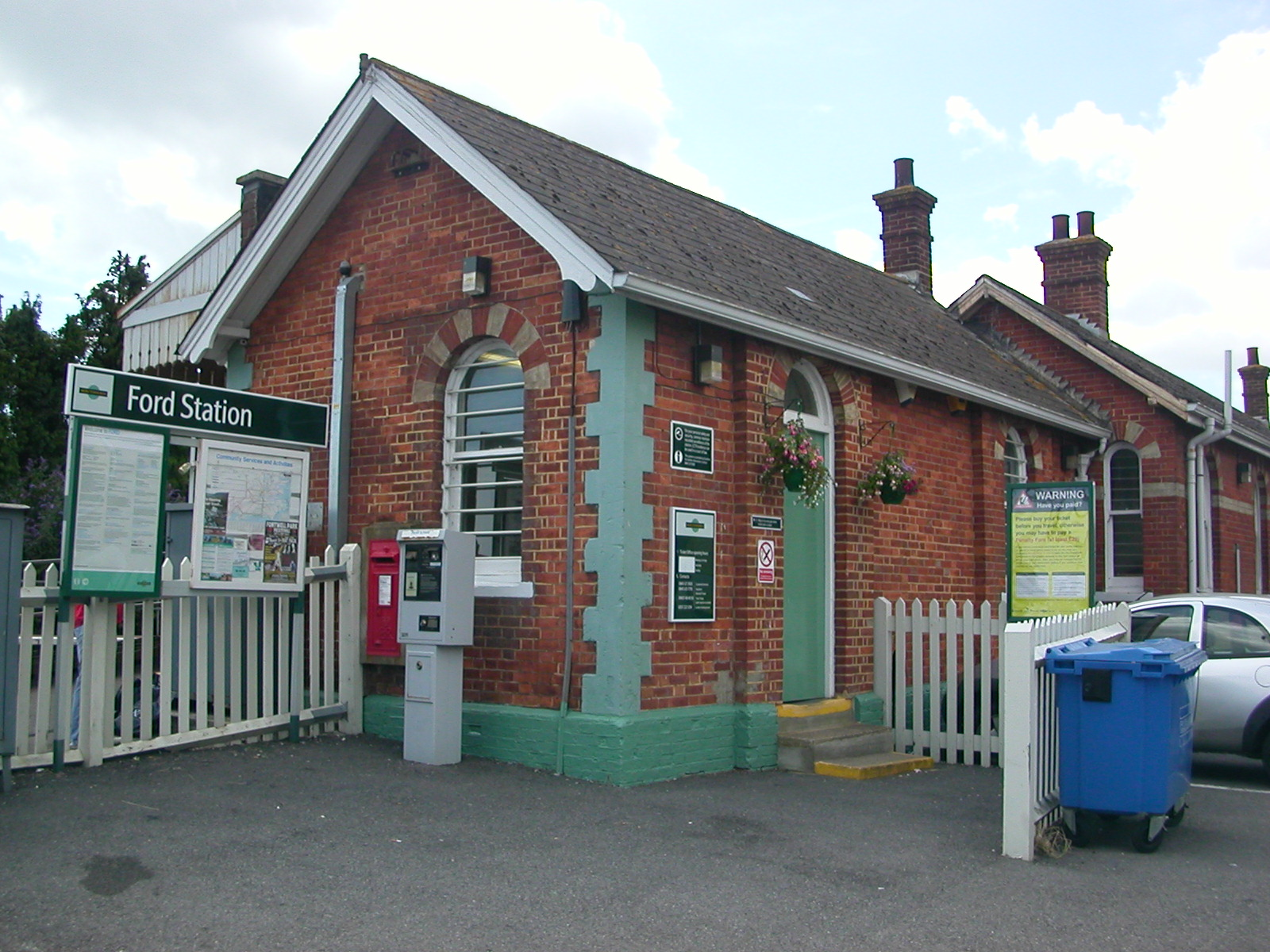

General information
- Location: Ford (Arundel), Arun, West Sussex; England
- Grid reference: TQ002042
- Managed by: Southern
- Platforms: 2 (was 3)

Other information
- Station code: FOD
- Classification: DfT category E

History
- Opened: 8 June 1846

Passengers
- 2020/21: ▼49,220
- Interchange: ▼37,136
- 2021/22: ▲92,108
- Interchange: ▲79,674
- 2022/23: ▲94,128
- Interchange: ▲97,834
- 2023/24: ▲0.106 million
- Interchange: ▲0.102 million
- 2024/25: ▲0.117 million
- Interchange: ▲0.103 million
Location
Notes
- Passenger statistics from the Office of Rail and Road

Ford railway station is a railway station in Ford, West Sussex, England. It is located on the West Coastway Line which runs between Brighton and Southampton and it is 60 miles 48 chains (97.5 km) down the line from London Bridge via Redhill. The station and the trains serving it are operated by Southern. The station is on a notably busy section of line and has low capacity; due to this delays are frequent especially to the east of the station. The line to the east of the station has a visibly high gradient, from the view from the platform, as the track climbs over the high banked River Arun. A busy level crossing is also found to the east of the station, before the river bridge.

== Location ==
Ford serves a rural community with only a few houses and one pub nearby, HMP Ford is about one mile south of the station. Adjacent to the station is the large model railway shop Gaugemaster.

Ford station is close to the junction where the Arun Valley Line and the west coastway line. Due to the geometry of the junction it is impossible for trains to run from the Arun Valley line towards Brighton without changing direction in Littlehampton. To the west of the ‘Arun valley junction’ a triangular junction connecting the West Coastway to the short branch to Littlehampton. It is sometimes used as an interchange for those lines, however, due to the station's lack of facilities, most passengers prefer to change at Barnham.

== Facilities ==
Ford station has a ticket office which is open for part of the day. There is a passenger-operated ticket-issuing machine available on platform 1.

Ford was a 3 platform station but one platform was closed and is now abandoned and overgrown.

- Ticket office (1 Window)
- Waiting Rooms x2
- Toilets (closed Sundays)
- Post Box
- Sheltered seating around the station
- Departure Boards (1 on both platforms)
- Subway (linking platforms)
- Car Park

== Information ==
The station is staffed Monday–Saturday 06:30–13:20 and Sunday 08:10–15:40. It has CCTV installed.

== Services ==
All services at Ford are operated by Southern using class 377 EMUs. Although Southern run some Gatwick Express 387 EMUs to fill in for 377s on the Brighton to Southampton route.

The typical off-peak service in trains per hour is:

- 2 tph to London Victoria via Horsham
- 3 tph to Brighton (1 of these runs via Littlehampton)
- 2 tph to Bognor Regis
- 2 tph to Southampton Central
- 1 tph to Chichester

Preceding station	National Rail	Following station
Angmering	Southern West Coastway Line	Barnham
Littlehampton	Southern West Coastway Line Littlehampton Branch	Barnham
Arundel	Southern Arun Valley Line	Barnham

== Accidents and incidents ==
On 5 August 1951, an electric multiple unit overran signals and was in a rear-end collision with another at the station. Ten people were killed and 46 were injured.

== Gallery ==
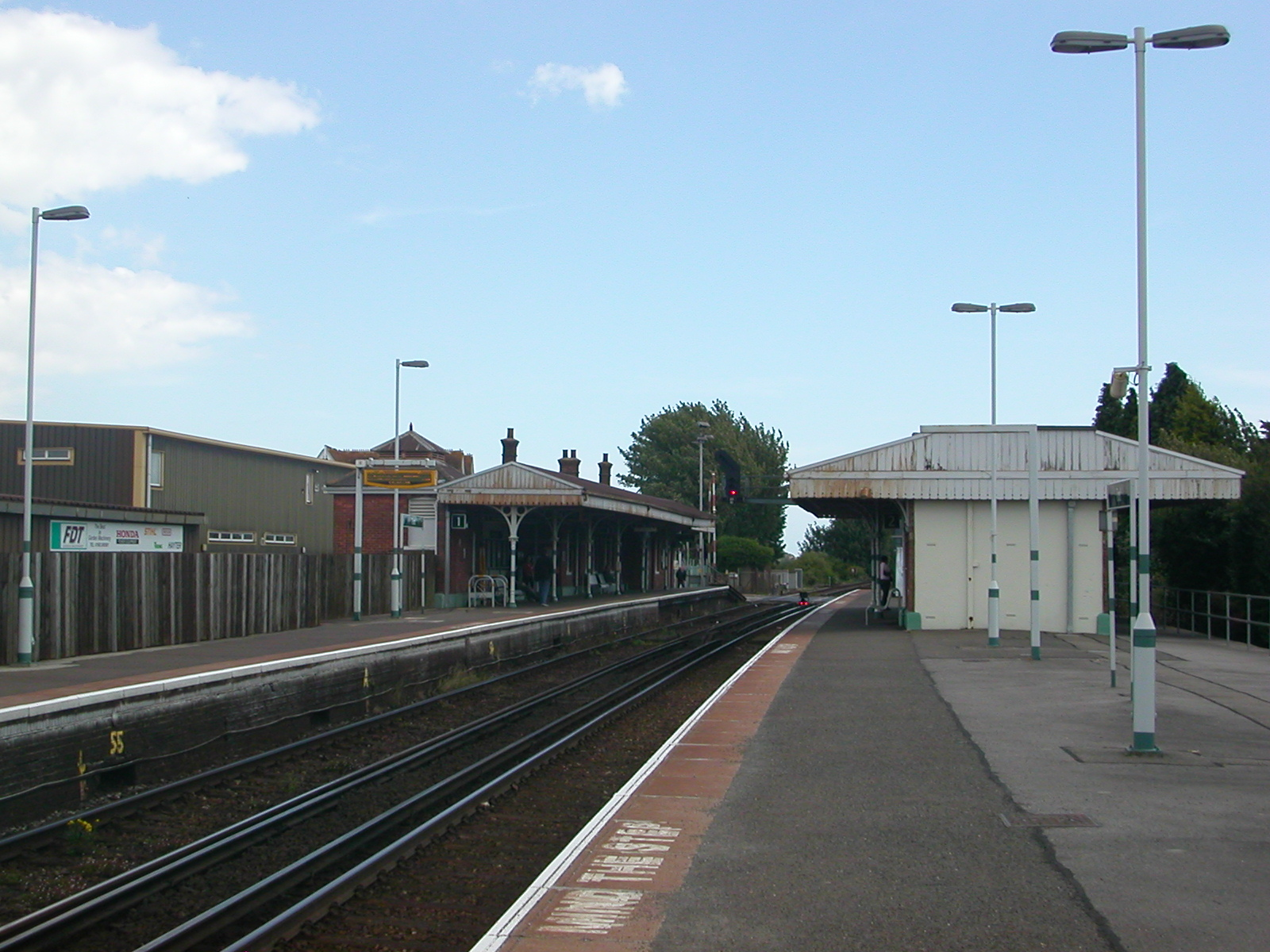
General view looking east.

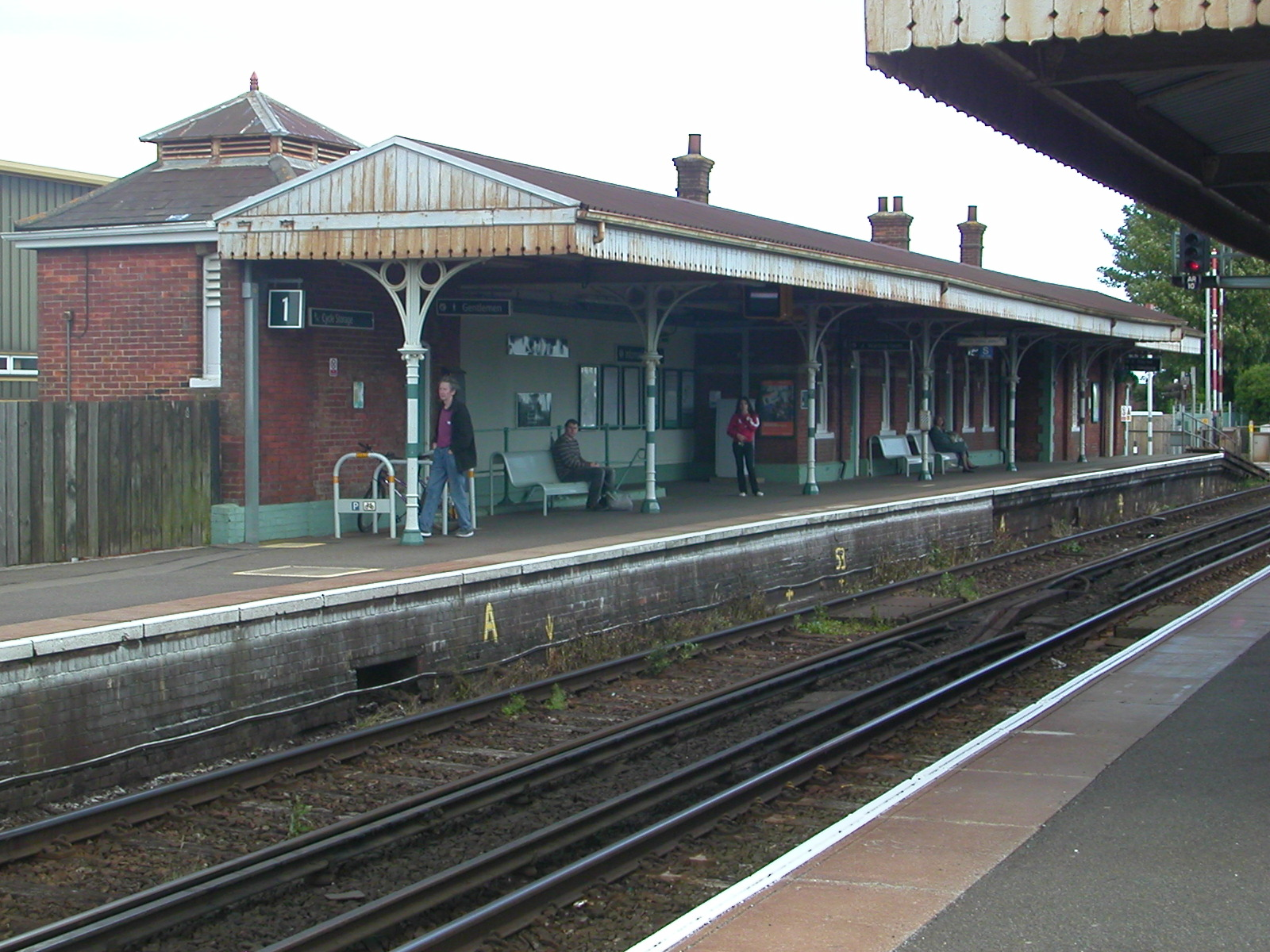
Platform 1 buildings.

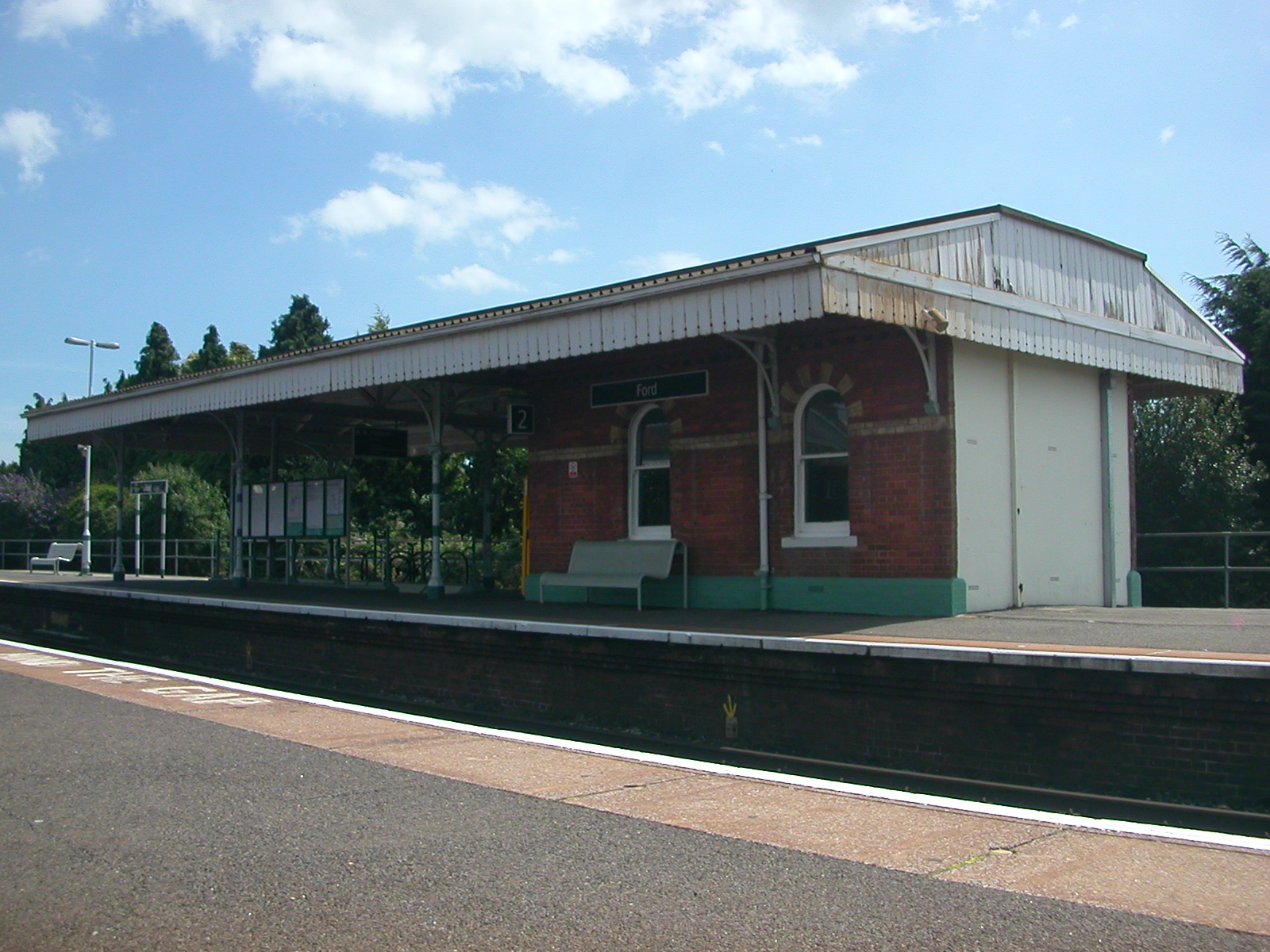
Platform 2 buildings.
