= Litt =

Litt is a surname. Notable people with this surname include:

- David Litt (born 1986), American speechwriter and author
- Brian Litt (born 1960), American neuroscientist
- Louis Litt, a fictional lawyer in the Suits TV series
- Robert S. Litt, American lawyer
- Scott Litt (born 1954), American record producer
- Toby Litt (born 1968), English author and academic

== See also ==
- Litt Live, an online radio service
- Lit (disambiguation)
- Leet (disambiguation)
- Lite (disambiguation)
