= Leet (disambiguation) =

Leet is an online slang and alternative orthography.

L337 may also refer to:

- Mercedes-Benz L 337, a lorry made by Daimler-Benz, 1959–1961
- ℓ 337 or Lectionary 337, by Gregory-Aland numbering, a Greek manuscript of the New Testament, on parchment
- L3-37, voiced by Phoebe Waller-Bridge in Solo: A Star Wars Story, Lando's droid, who integrated with the Millennium Falcon's computer

Leet or LEET may also refer to:

== Law ==
- Leet, a mediaeval court leet or its jurisdiction
- Legal Education Eligibility Test, a South Korean law school exam

== People ==
- Leet (surname)—lists people so named
- Leet O'Brien, American architect

== Places ==
- Leet Township, Pennsylvania, United States
- Leet, West Virginia, United States
- Leets Vale, New South Wales, near Sydney, Australia

== Other uses ==
- Leat or leet, an artificially dug watercourse or aqueduct
- Leet (programming language), an esoteric/conceptual computer language
- Leet-ale, a type of parish fair
- LEET rocket engine, a conceptual engine design to replace the Raptor engine used in SpaceX Starship

== See also ==
- Ryan Leet, an ocean-going salvage tug
- Leete (disambiguation)
