= Marjorie Leet =

American actress (1904–1994)

- Leet in 1925, photographed by Alfred Cheney Johnston
- Born: 13 May 1904; Iowa, U.S.
- Died: 4 January 1994 (aged 89); Deerfield Beach, Florida, U.S.
- Years active: 1923–1954

Marjorie Leet (May 13, 1904 – January 4, 1994) was an American actress, Ziegfeld girl and revue dancer.

== Biography ==
Leet on the cover of Midweek-Pictorial, 1924.

Leet was born in Iowa, her father William A. Leet was a landowner who owned the William A. Leet and Frederick Hassler Farmstead District, however the costs of the construction of the building led him to loose his wealth, leading him and his wife to divorce, and to loose the building to his farm manager Frederick H. Hassler. They would relocate and live in Minneapolis until 1922 when she left for New York to join the Morgan Dancers upon the invitation of Marion Morgan.

She was invited by Florenz Ziegfeld to appear in the Ziegfeld Follies of 1923, continuing on with various productions and events during the 1920s. She starred in the musicals No Foolin' in June 1926 at the Globe Theatre, Criss Cross in 1926 and appearing alongside John Wayne in The Big Trail in 1930. She would appear on General Motors Theatre in 1952 and On Camera in 1954, later she would move to Deerfield Beach, Florida, and die in 1994.
