= Barnham railway station =

Railway station in West Sussex, England

Coordinates: 50°49′52″N 0°38′26″W

Barnham
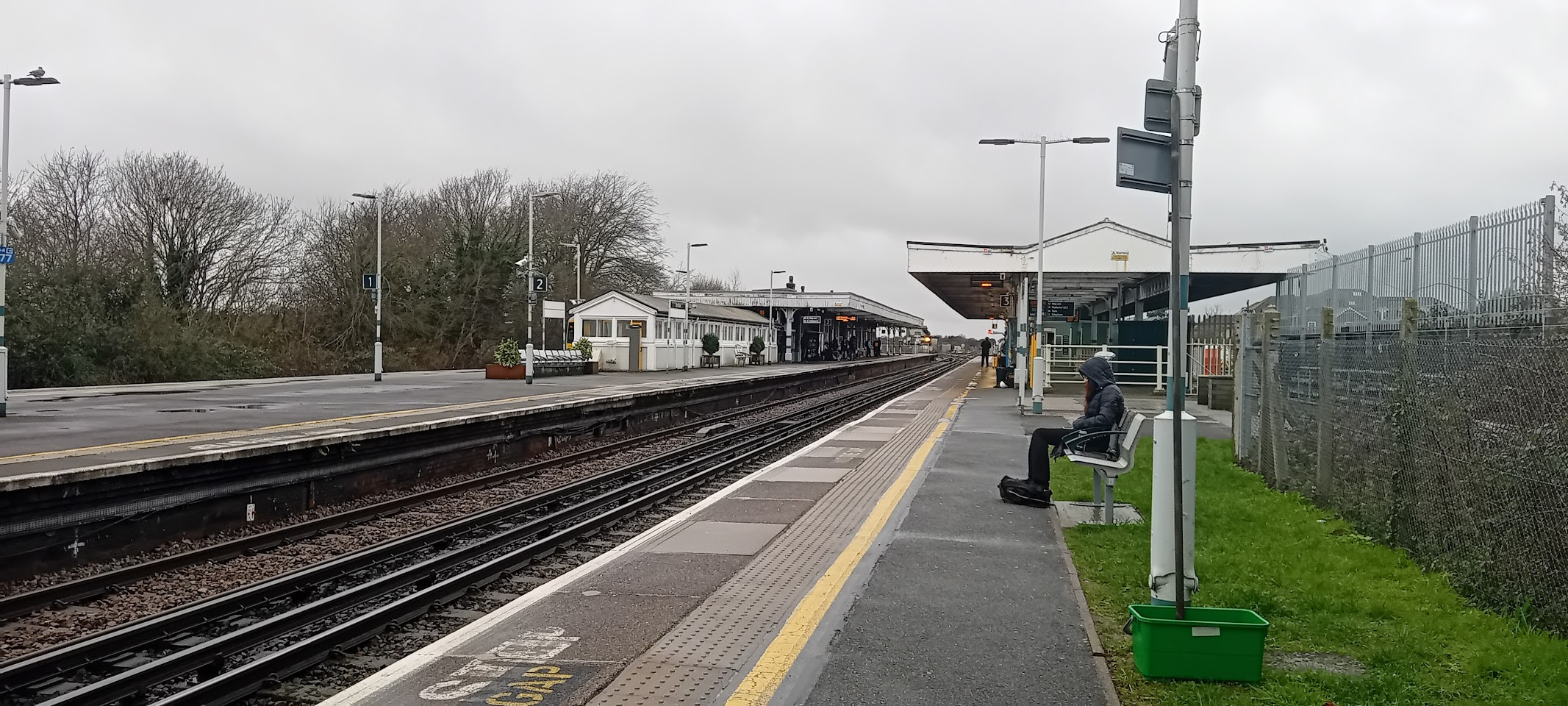

General information
- Location: Barnham, Arun, West Sussex; England
- Grid reference: SU958043
- Manager: Southern
- Platforms: 3

Other information
- Station code: BAA
- Classification: DfT category D

History
- Opened: 1 June 1864

Passengers
- 2020/21: ▼0.397 million
- Interchange: ▼0.275 million
- 2021/22: ▲0.846 million
- Interchange: ▲0.626 million
- 2022/23: ▲0.925 million
- Interchange: ▲0.703 million
- 2023/24: ▲0.969 million
- Interchange: ▼0.667 million
- 2024/25: ▲1.032 million
- Interchange: ▲0.794 million
Location
Notes
- Passenger statistics from the Office of Rail and Road

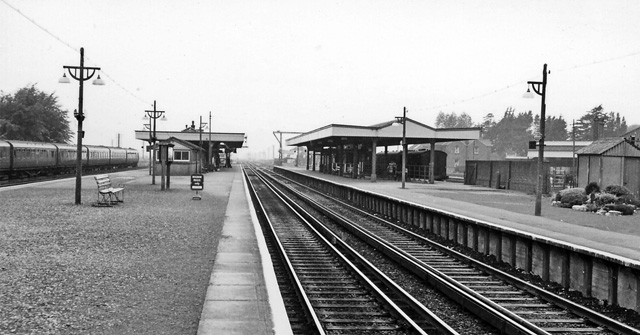
Station in 1961

Barnham railway station is in Barnham, West Sussex, England around 5 miles (8.0 km) north of Bognor Regis.

It is located on the West Coastway Line between Brighton and Southampton, 63 miles 22 chains (101.8 km) down the line from London Bridge via Redhill. The station and all services are operated by Southern which operate at the station using Class 377 EMUs.

== History ==
Barnham station was opened by the London, Brighton and South Coast Railway on 1 June 1864, with the new branch line to Bognor Regis, for which Barnham was the junction, opening the same day. It was sited on the LB&SCR Brighton to Portsmouth line to the west of the original Yapton station, and to the east of Woodgate station.

== Platforms ==
Barnham is the junction station for the short branch to Bognor Regis. It is also a well-used interchange for passengers between slow and fast services. It has eastbound services to London Victoria via Horsham and Gatwick Airport, Brighton via Worthing and Littlehampton via Ford, as well as westbound services to Bognor Regis, Portsmouth, Southampton. Trains travelling from east to west (i.e. heading towards Chichester and Bognor Regis) sometimes divide (or attach in the case of west to east services) at Barnham, particularly services on Sundays.

- Platform 1 - Westbound services towards Bognor Regis (either starting at Barnham or from Littlehampton)
- Platform 2 - Westbound services towards Chichester, Portsmouth, Southampton or Bognor Regis (from London)
- Platform 3 - Eastbound services towards Littlehampton, Brighton, London

== Services ==
All services at Barnham are operated by Southern using Class 377 EMUs.

The typical off-peak service in trains per hour is:

- 4 tph to London Victoria via Horsham (2 of these run non-stop to Horsham and 2 are stopping services - the fast and stopping services attach at Horsham, giving 2 tph to London Victoria beyond Horsham)
- 4 tph to Brighton (1 of these runs via Littlehampton)
- 4 tph to Bognor Regis
- 2 tph to Southampton Central
- 3 tph to Portsmouth & Southsea of which 2 continue to Portsmouth Harbour
- 1 tph to Chichester

In the peak hours, the station is served by a single service between Bognor Regis and London Bridge via Littlehampton.

Preceding station	National Rail	Following station
Ford or Horsham	Southern Arun Valley Line	Chichester
Ford or Angmering	Southern West Coastway Line	Chichester
Ford or Terminus	Southern; West Coastway line Bognor Regis Branch	Bognor Regis

== Former services ==
Until May 2022, Great Western Railway operated limited services between Brighton, Portsmouth Harbour and Bristol Temple Meads that called at Barnham.

== Accidents and incidents ==
- On 1 August 1962, an electric multiple unit was derailed when points switched under it due to an electrical fault. Thirty-eight people were injured. The cause was an electrical short circuit due to a metal washer that had been left behind after maintenance, which caused a false feed to the points motor under unusual circumstances with a very high power load from three trains accelerating simultaneously. Adrian Vaughan commented; "One gets a nasty feeling wondering where the next washer is, at this moment, lying in wait with the potential of mayhem". Before his book had even been published, the Clapham Junction disaster occurred, with a very similar cause.
