= Bognor Regis railway station =

Railway station in West Sussex, England

Coordinates: 50.787°N 0.676°W

Bognor Regis
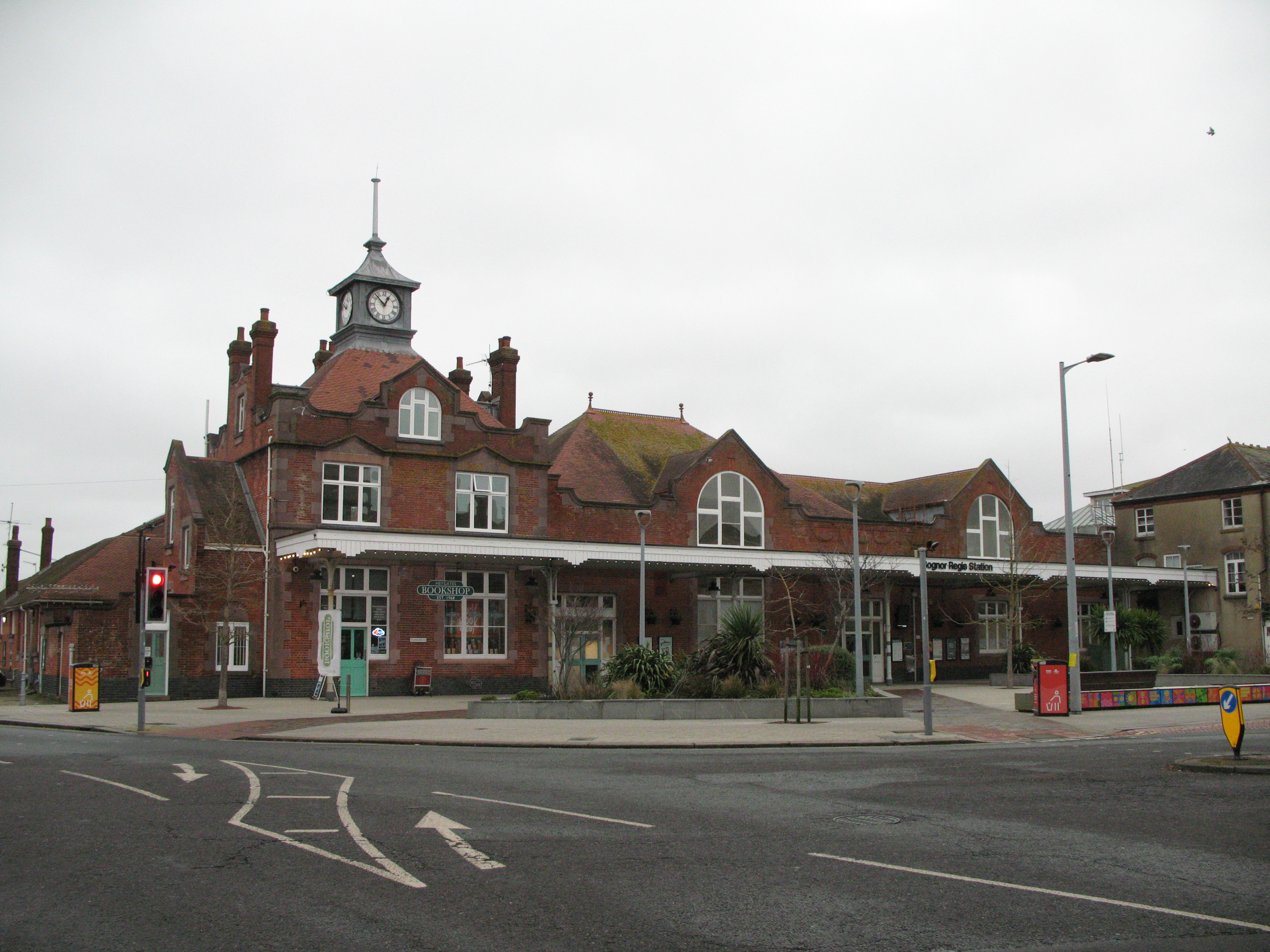
- Bognor Regis Station

General information
- Location: Bognor Regis, Arun; England
- Grid reference: SZ934994
- Manager: Southern
- Platforms: 4

Other information
- Station code: BOG
- Classification: DfT category D

History
- Opened: 1 June 1864

Passengers
- 2020/21: ▼0.426 million
- 2021/22: ▲0.907 million
- 2022/23: ▲1.025 million
- 2023/24: ▼1.009 million
- 2024/25: ▲1.087 million

Listed Building – Grade II
- Feature: Railway Station
- Designated: 8 August 1989
- Reference no.: 1027734
Location
Notes
- Passenger statistics from the Office of Rail and Road

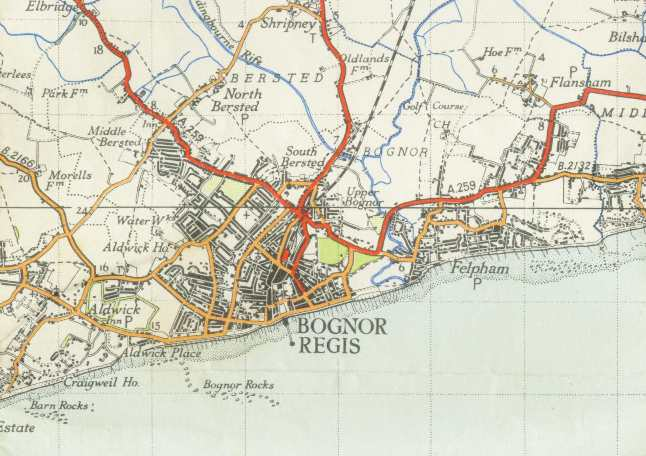
A 1947 Ordnance Survey map, showing Bognor Regis station

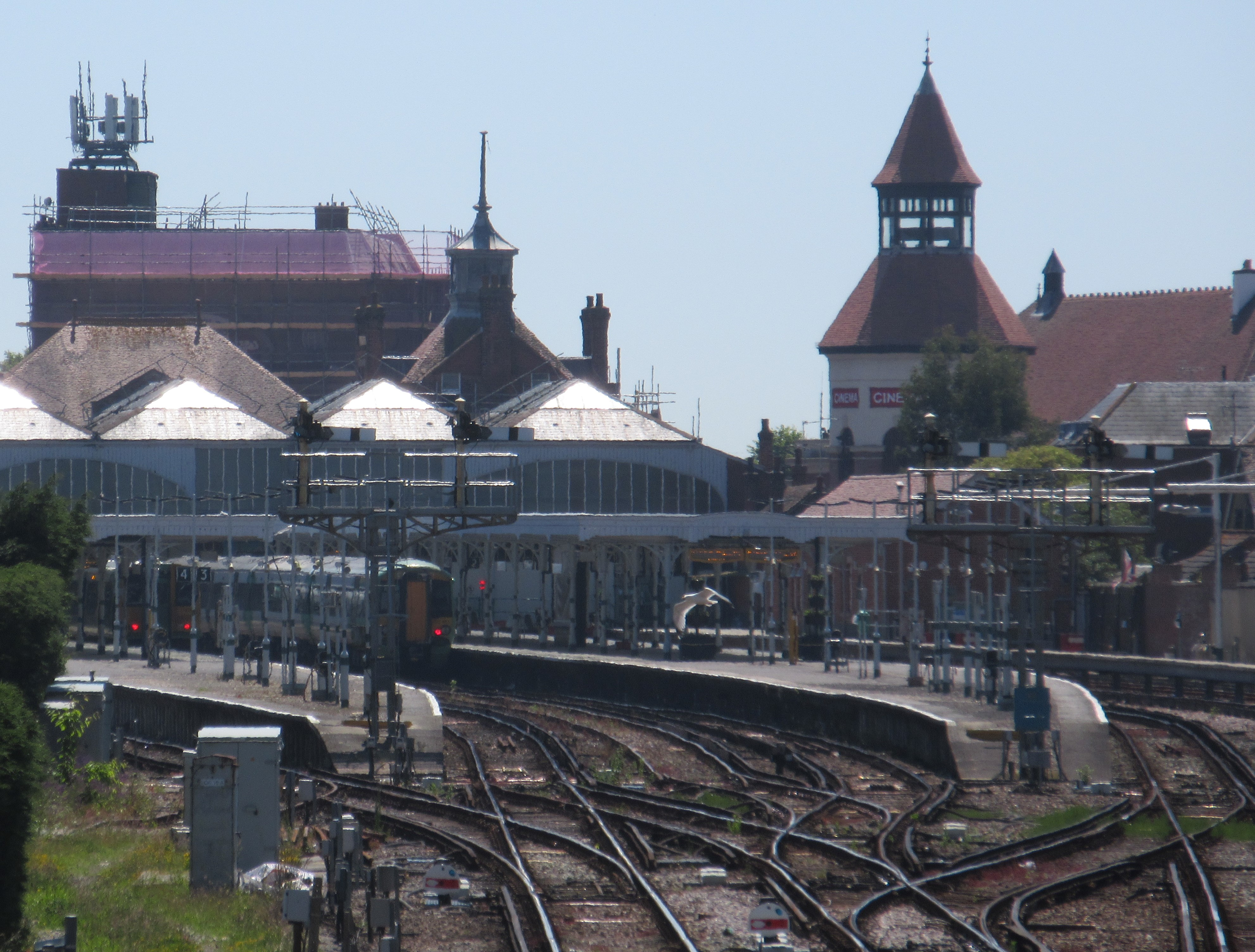
Bognor Regis station and pointwork

Bognor Regis railway station serves the town of Bognor Regis, West Sussex, England. It opened as the terminus of a short branch line in 1864, replacing a more distant station on the Worthing to Chichester main line. Like the town it serves, it was known as Bognor until 1929. The junction on the main line is Barnham station, opened on the same day as the branch itself.

With the developing leisure traffic travelling to the resort, the opportunity was taken to provide a lavish and commodious station in 1902. Electrification followed in 1937 as part of the Portsmouth No. 2 Electrification scheme of the Southern Railway, and a frequent service of trains from London was provided.

Bognor Regis station is approximately 54 miles (87 km) southwest of London Victoria. The station is managed and serviced by Southern, a Greater Thameslink Railway brand. The train service on the main line and the branch is known as the West Coastway Line.

== History ==
The first station to serve Bognor was situated on the Brighton to Chichester main line at Woodgate Crossing, a little more than one mile (1.6 km) west of the present Barnham railway station. It was opened on 8 June 1846 by the Brighton and Chichester Railway, which was absorbed into the London Brighton and South Coast Railway when that company was formed a few weeks later. At first there were no branch lines on the main route, and the station was about three miles (4.8 km) from Bognor itself.

This original Bognor station was renamed Woodgate for Bognor in November 1846, and seems to have been erratically named in Bradshaw as Woodgate or Bognor.

Bognor Railway Act 1861
- Act of Parliament
- Parliament of the United Kingdom
- Long title: An Act for making a Railway from the London, Brighton, and South Coast Railway in the Parish of Eastergate in the County of Sussex to Bognor; and for other Purposes.
- Citation: 24 & 25 Vict. c. cxx

Dates
- Royal assent: 11 July 1861

In 1845 a railway connection to Barnham from Guildford had been proposed, but that, and later proposed local lines in 1853 and 1855 foundered. Nevertheless it was obvious that without a railway connection, a community was at a severe disadvantage due to the high cost of transporting heavy materials, and local interests put forward a further scheme, which was authorised as the Bognor Railway, by the Bognor Railway Act 1861 (24 & 25 Vict. c. cxx) of 11 July 1861.

The new branch line opened for traffic on 1 June 1864; a new station, called Barnham, was provided on the main line at the point of junction of the branch. There were no intermediate stations. The old Barnham (or Woodgate) station, together with Yapton station, nearby on the main line, closed. The new branch line was 3 miles 46 chains (5.75 km) in length, and was single track.

The station master at Woodgate had been a Mr Robinson; on his death in 1862, his daughter Miss Robinson had been employed in the booking office and continued until leaving on marrying, the following year. "She must have been one of the earliest women clerks on railways in Britain."

The Bognor Railway Company was independent of the LBSCR, but was absorbed by it in 1870.

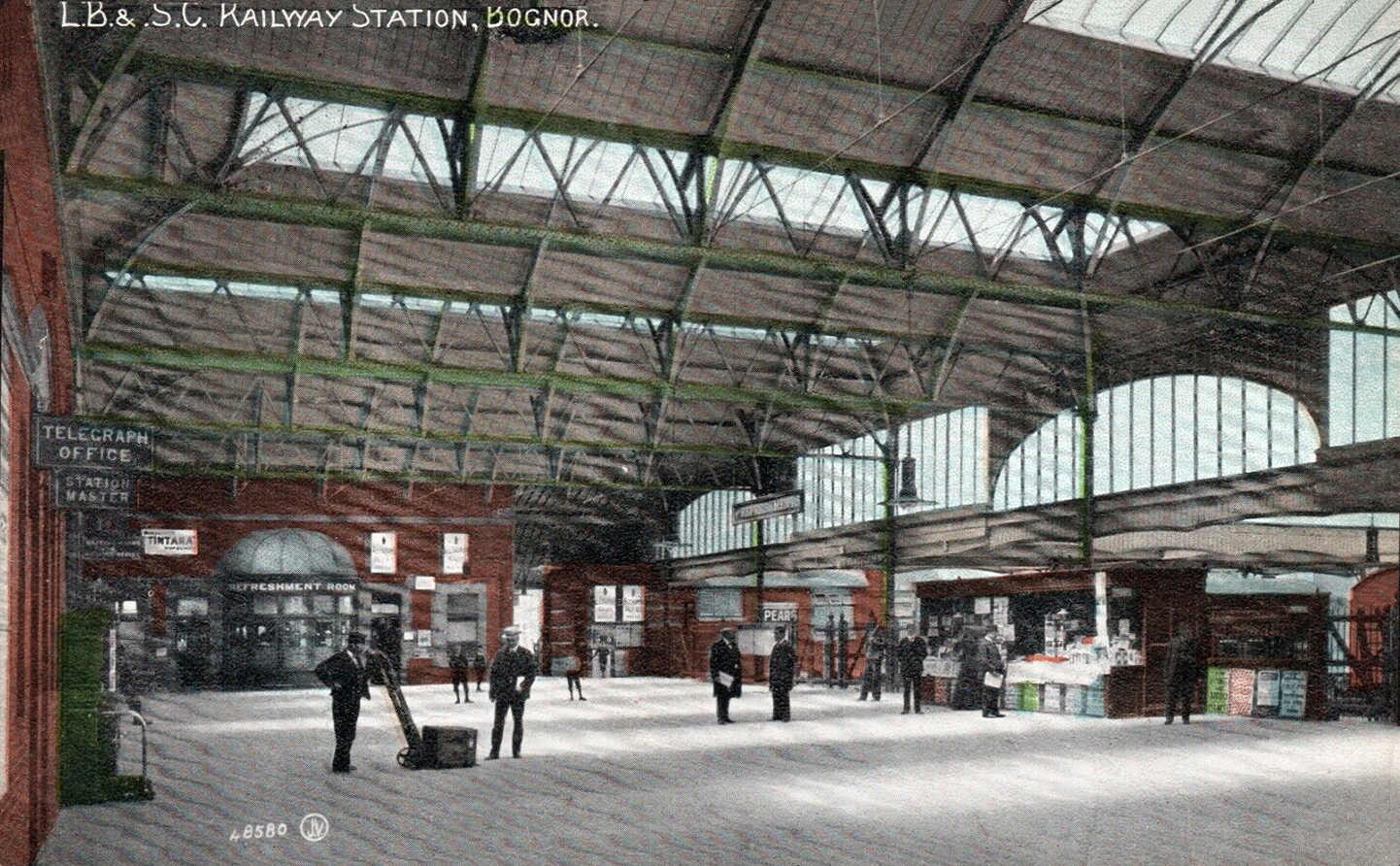
Concourse of Bognor station in 1905

Bognor station suffered partial destruction twice: it was blown down in a gale in 1897, and then burned down in 1899. The present station buildings by the company architect C. D. Collins date from 1902 and have achieved grade II listed building status as a complete example of an Edwardian period seaside station terminus.

The line was doubled at the immediate area of Bognor station in 1902 to ease station working, from Bearsted Crossing, a distance of about 200 yards (180 m). The remainder of the branch was doubled on 30 July 1911; the work included the remodelling of the layout at Barnham to incorporate a double junction immediately west of the station, enabling direct running to and from the branch, which had not previously been possible.

== Electrification ==
The electrification of the Mid-Sussex line and associated connections was known as the Portsmouth No. 2 Electrification (after the Portsmouth Direct Line). A government loan at a cheap rate of interest was made available under the Railways (Agreement) Act 1935 (26 Geo. 5 & 1 Edw. 8. c. 6). The electrification was on the third-rail direct current system already in use in the London suburban area and on the Portsmouth Direct Line. It comprised the route from Dorking to Horsham and onwards through Arundel to the coastal junction at Ford and on to Havant (for Portsmouth). The line from West Worthing to Ford was included, and the Littlehampton and Bognor Regis branches were covered. Barnham and Bognor Regis stations had their platforms extended to 820 feet (250 m) to enable 12-car trains to use them, and the layout at Barnham was altered to facilitate dividing and combining trains there. A new 66-lever frame was provided at Bognor Regis signalbox. New electrified berthing sidings were provided.

The official inauguration took place on 30 June 1938, and regular electric services commenced on 2 July 1938. The normal fast train service to Bognor Regis from Victoria was via Sutton, Dorking and Horsham, dividing at Barnham. The front four-car unit detached and continued forward to Portsmouth, and the rear 8 cars (4-Buf + 4-Cor) ran to Bognor Regis. At peak times some London trains ran via Three Bridges, or to and from London Bridge.

== Facilities ==
The station has a ticket office, car park, and 4 platforms in use: platforms 1 to 3 are 12 carriages in length whilst platform 4 is only 4 carriages long. The station has a small Café.

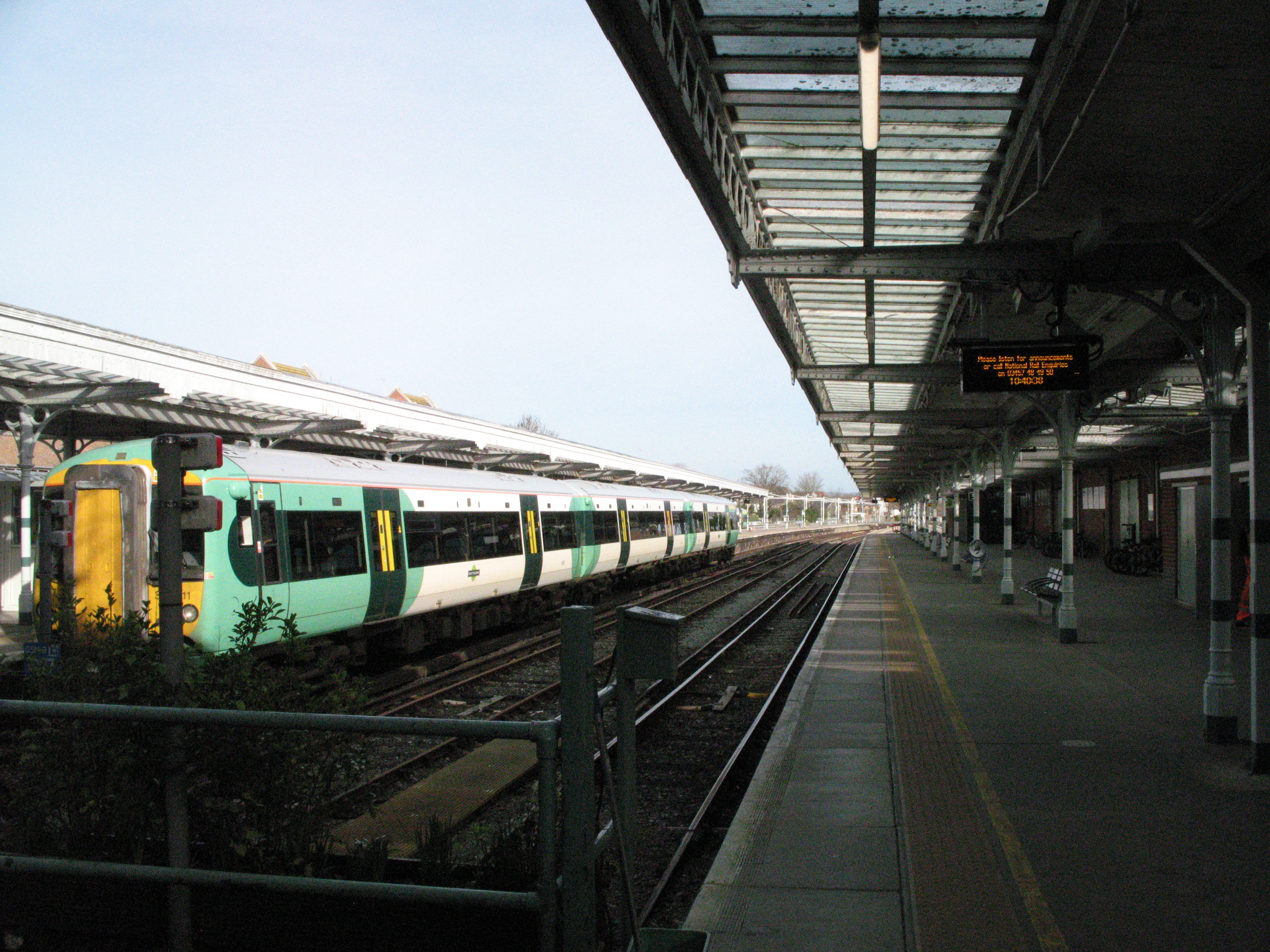
Bognor Regis station platform 3

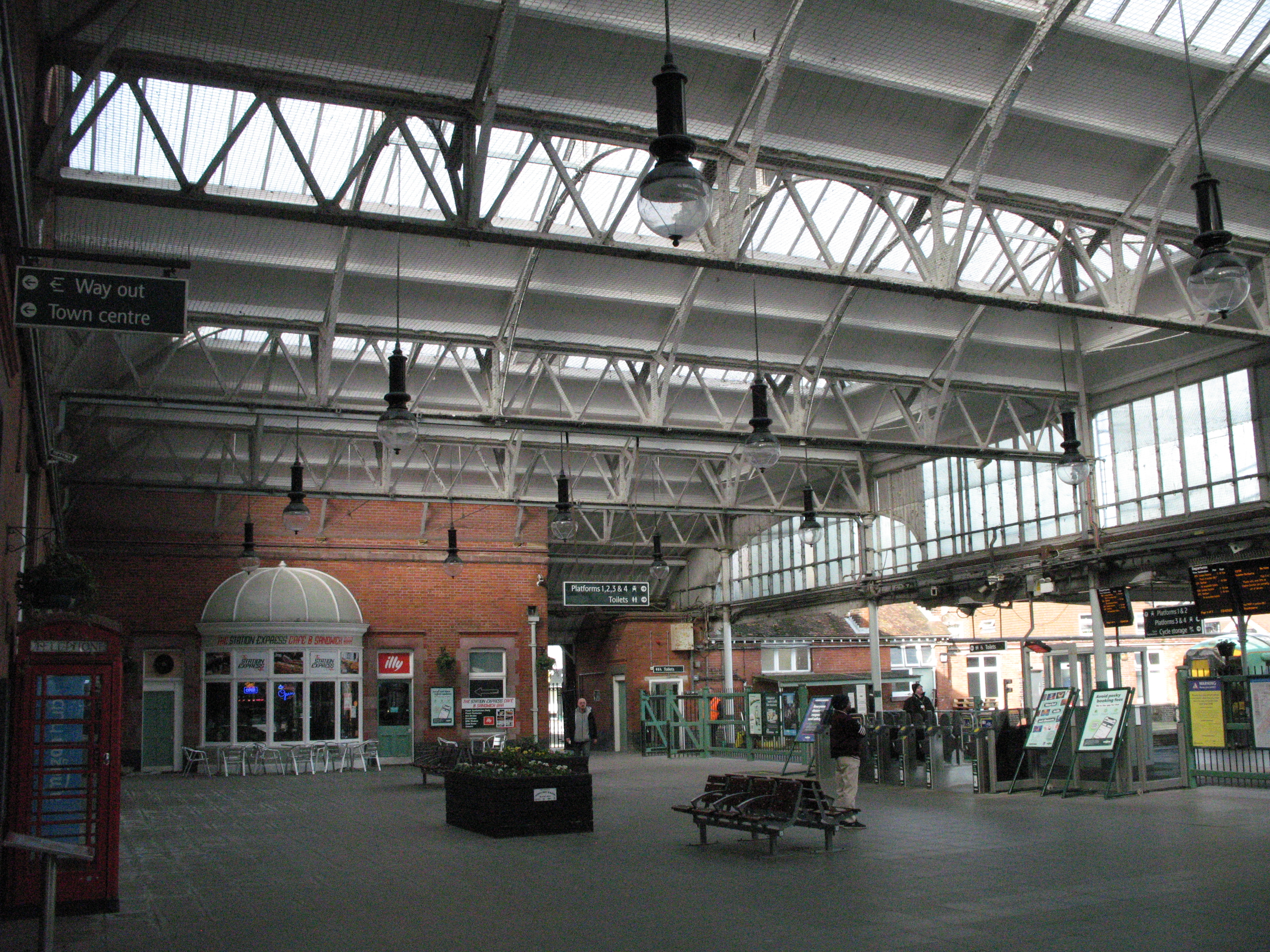
Bognor Regis Station Concourse In 2026

== Services ==
All services at Bognor Regis are operated by Southern using Class 377 EMUs.

The typical off-peak service in trains per hour is:

- 2 tph to London Victoria via Horsham
- 2 tph to Barnham (Shuttle)

There is an additional train during peak hours to London Bridge via Littlehampton and Horsham

Passengers are able to change at Barnham for eastbound services towards Littlehampton, Worthing and Brighton, and westbound services towards Chichester, Havant, Portsmouth Harbour and Southampton Central.

On Sundays, the service to London Victoria is reduced to hourly. The shuttle services to Barnham do not run, and there is instead an hourly service to Littlehampton.

Preceding station	National Rail	Following station
Barnham	Southern West Coastway Line Bognor Regis Branch	Terminus

== Accidents and incidents ==
- On 14 November 2008, a passenger train was derailed at the station during a period of resignalling and single line working due to a signaller's error.
- On 22 October 2020, Class 313 electric multiple unit 313212 was derailed at the station due to a signaller's error.
