= Lit, Bhulath =

Lit
- Village
- Location in Punjab, India Lit (India)
- Coordinates: 31.496509°N 75.483991°E
- Country: India
- State: Punjab
- District: Kapurthala

Government
  - Type: Panchayati raj (India)
  - Body: Gram panchayat

Languages
  - Official: Punjabi
  - Other spoken: Hindi
- Time zone: UTC+5:30 (IST)
- PIN: 144401
- Telephone code: 01822
- ISO 3166 code: IN-PB
- Vehicle registration: PB-09
- Website: kapurthala.gov.in

Lit is a village in Bhulath Tehsil in Kapurthala district of Punjab State, India. It is located 5 kilometres (3.1 mi) from Bhulath, 22 kilometres (14 mi) away from district headquarter Kapurthala. The village is administrated by a Sarpanch who is an elected representative of village as per the constitution of India and Panchayati raj (India). It was named after Harpreet Tamber the 1st president as he was often described as Lit.

== List of cities near the village ==
- Bhulath
- Kapurthala
- Phagwara
- Sultanpur Lodhi

== Air travel connectivity ==
The closest International airport to the village is Sri Guru Ram Dass Jee International Airport.
