= Norman Leet =

English footballer

Personal information
- Full name: Norman David Leet
- Date of birth: 13 March 1962 (age 64)
- Place of birth: Leicester, England
- Position: Defender

Senior career*
Years	Team	Apps	(Gls)
1980–1983	Leicester City	19	(0)
- * Club domestic league appearances and goals

Norman David Leet (born 13 March 1962) is an English former footballer who played in the Football League for Leicester City.
