= West Coastway line =

Railway line in southern England

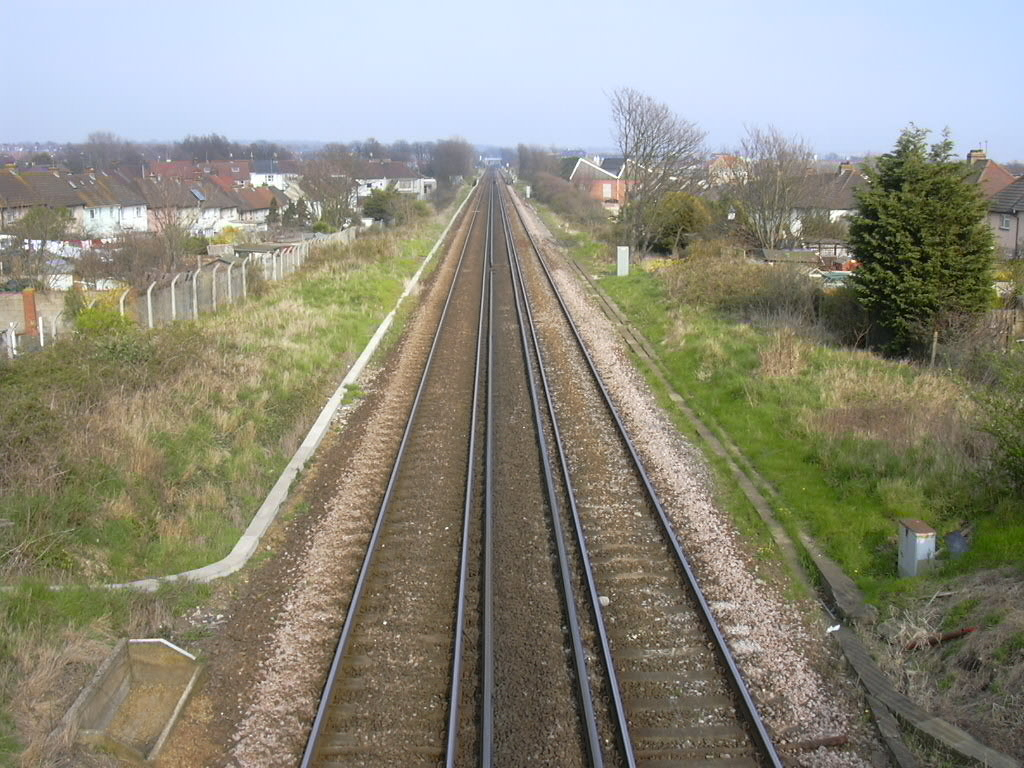
- Looking eastwards from Fishersgate, April 2007

Overview
- Status: Operational
- Owner: Network Rail
- Locale: West Sussex, Hampshire
- Termini: Brighton, Southampton Central
- Stations: 39

Service
- Type: Suburban rail, Heavy rail
- System: National Rail
- Operators: Southern (whole); Great Western Railway (part); South Western Railway (part)
- Depots: Brighton; Littlehampton; Fratton; Southampton
- Rolling stock: Class 158 Express Sprinter; Class 165 Networker Turbo; Class 166 Networker Turbo; Class 377 Electrostar; Class 387 Electrostar; Class 444 Desiro; Class 450 Desiro

History
- Opened: 1840

Technical
- Line length: 62 mi 4 ch (99.86 km)
- Num of tracks: 2 (up to 4 in areas)
- Track gauge: 1,435 mm (4 ft 8 1/2 in) standard gauge
- Electrification: 750 V DC third rail
- Operating speed: 85 mph (137 km/h) maximum
Route map
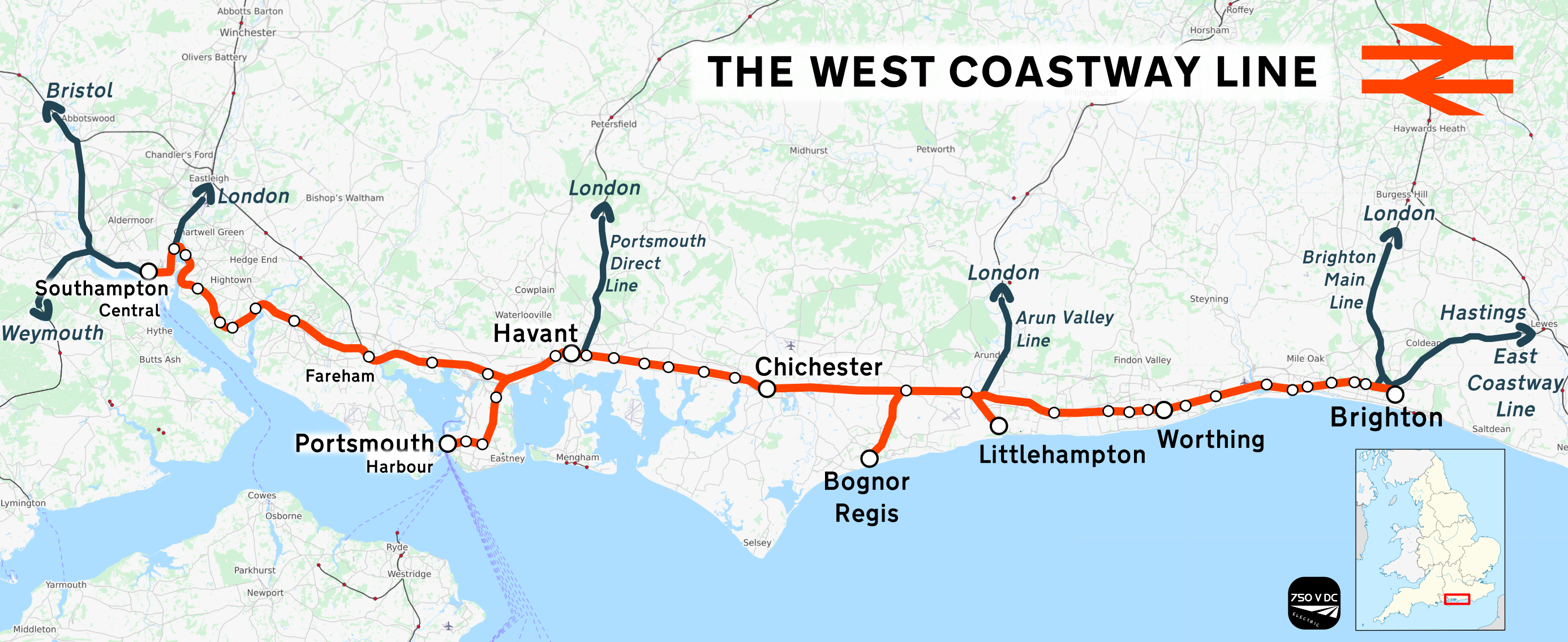
(Click to expand)

The West Coastway line is a railway line in West Sussex and Hampshire, England, which links the conurbations of Brighton/Hove/Littlehampton and Southampton/Portsmouth. It has short southward branches to Littlehampton and Bognor Regis, which offer direct services to and from London. From Brighton, the East Coastway line continues to Hastings, via Lewes, Eastbourne and Bexhill, and on then to Ashford International via the Marshlink line.

== History ==
The lines now operated under the West Coastway brand have a complex history and were built in stages by five different companies between 1840 and 1889.

The line from Brighton to Shoreham was a branch of the London and Brighton Railway which opened 12 May 1840, before the completion of the main line. The extensions of this line to Worthing (opened 24 November 1845), to Arundel & Littlehampton (opened 16 March 1846) and to Chichester (opened 8 June 1846) were built by the Brighton and Chichester Railway. In July 1846, these two companies merged with others to form the London, Brighton and South Coast Railway (LBSCR), which continued the line to Havant (opened 15 March 1847) and Portsmouth & Southsea (opened 14 June 1847). Part of this section became jointly owned with the London and South Western Railway (LSWR), following the opening of their line from Fareham to Portcreek Junction on 1 October 1848 (connecting to the Eastleigh–Fareham line).

The Southampton and Netley Railway built a line to connect with the Victoria Military Hospital at Netley, which opened 5 March 1866 and was operated by the LSWR. The final connecting link from Netley to Fareham was opened by the LSWR on 2 September 1889.

Meanwhile, the LBSCR opened the Littlehampton branch from Ford Junction on 17 August 1863 and the Bognor Regis branch from Barnham Junction on 1 June 1864.

=== Electrification ===
East of Portsmouth, the line was electrified by the Southern Railway before the Second World War using 750 V DC; it was completed in two stages:

1. Brighton to West Worthing in 1933.
2. West Worthing to Havant in 1938, where it joined up with the electrified Portsmouth Direct line, including the Littlehampton and Bognor branches.

Electrification continued further west in the late 1980s, enabling electric trains to travel the whole route via Netley to Southampton, or via Botley to Eastleigh. The London and South Western Railway ran the tracks west of Farlington Junction, north of Portsmouth, by the inland shore of Langstone Harbour. This section was served and timetabled separately before its electrification, a vestige of having had a different original railway company.

=== Accidents and incidents ===
- On 23 July 1894, the brake van and two carriages of a train were derailed and overturned at Farlington Halt. The guard was killed and seven passengers injured.
- On 5 August 1951, a train overran signals and was in a rear-end collision with another train at Ford. Ten people were killed and 46 were injured.
- On 1 August 1962, an electric multiple unit derailed at Barnham when points switched under it due to an electrical fault. Thirty-eight people were injured.
- On 22 September 1965, an electric multiple unit collided with a double decker bus on a level crossing between Angmering and Goring-by-Sea, due to errors by the crossing keeper. Eight people were injured and three killed.
- On 19 November 2020, a Southern Class 313 EMU numbered 313220 caught fire on platform 2 at West Worthing. No one was injured.
- On 1 February 2022, a driver who stepped out of the cab in the siding to the west of West Worthing was struck and killed by a Southern Class 377 EMU approaching the station. Investigations by the Rail Accident Investigation Branch concluded that the driver had likely left the safety of his cab to urinate, as Class 313 trains do not have on-board toilets. The RAIB recommended that Govia Thameslink Railway should review staff toilet facilities on its routes, and ensure that staff are aware of these facilities and have sufficient time to use them.

=== Historic service patterns ===
Beyond the line and its main links to London, trains ran from Reading General or Basingstoke to Portsmouth or Brighton before late 2007. The Department for Transport withdrew the obligation for South West Trains to run Brighton services, which left free train paths which were filled by extra Southern trains mainly bound to or from London.

Prior to the 1980s electrification of the south Hampshire lines, including the part of this line west of Farlington, services were operated as a separate entity terminating at Portsmouth; few trains traversed the Cosham to Farlington triangle, which lies north of Portsmouth and Langstone Harbours, except a daily Brighton to Exeter St Davids through train. With dieselisation, services were operated using Class 205 3H from 1958; the general service pattern every hour was:

- one semi-fast train between Portsmouth and Salisbury, via Southampton (Note: Some services were extended to/from Bristol Temple Meads.)
- one train to Botley and Eastleigh. (Note: Some services were extended to Reading and, until 1966, Romsey via Chandler's Ford.)

In 2024, Southern proposed significant service pattern changes: by diverting all London Victoria to Southampton Central services to Portsmouth Harbour instead; and doubling Southampton Central to Brighton services, with an additional stop at Woolston. The lightly-used Littlehampton to Portsmouth & Southsea and Bognor Regis services would be replaced by a new Brighton to Chichester service, via Littlehampton. The changes were implemented in June 2024.

== Features and developments ==
- Brighton trains serving the West Coastway leave from platforms 1, 2 and 3 on a curve to leave the Brighton Main Line.
- Holland Road Halt was opened in 1905; it was closed 1956, when it was the only station on the West Coastway line to retain timber decking. This station was sited just west of the Holland Road bridge. Remains of the steps from the street and the concrete supports can occasionally be seen in winter beside the up (Note: The 'up' direction on the line is towards Brighton.) line. (Note: To the east of the Holland Road bridge lay the site of a first Hove station, between 1840 and 1880; the site was used later as a commercial coal yard.)
- Aldrington replaced Dyke Junction Halt in 1932 on an adjacent site. Dyke Junction Halt opened in 1905 to serve the Devil's Dyke single-line branch, (Note: The branch was 3.5 mi (5.6 km) in length.) which closed 1938
- There was a branch to Kingston Wharf, serving Shoreham Harbour.
- There was the junction for the line to Horsham, opened 16 September 1861 and closed 7 March 1966. The line followed the valley of the river Adur.
- Bungalow Town Halt was opened in 1910, later to serve Shoreham Airport; it was closed in 1940 for national security reasons, as the airport became an RAF base during the Second World War.
- The Littlehampton branch. This is a 2-mile (3.2 km) branch line opened as a single line in 1863 and doubled in 1887.
- Ford Junction, at the third node of the triangle.
- Barnham Junction, open between 1864 and 1929, was the junction for Bognor Regis branch, 3.5-mile (5.6 km) in length.
- Drayton station is now closed.
- Chichester was the original terminus of the Brighton and Chichester Railway, opened on 6 June 1846. The present station opened 1847 when the line was extended to Havant Junction for the West Sussex Railway, which opened in 1897 and closed 1935.
- The LBSCR branch to Midhurst opened 1881 and was closed to passengers in 1935.
- Havant was the junction for the L&SWR Portsmouth Direct line through Petersfield and the LBSCR's Hayling Island branch line. It was opened on 16 July 1867 and was 4.5 miles (7.2 km) in length, with two intermediate stations serving Langstone and North Hayling. The line was closed in 1963.
- A triangular junction connected for the two routes to Southampton and Portsmouth Harbour. After Farlington Junction and Portcreek Junction (Note: The now closed Farlington Halt lay in between.) Portsmouth Direct line trains used the joint L&SWR/LBSCR metals to Portsmouth. The main West Coastway route travels across the triangle to Cosham Junction, where the L&SWR section, opened on 2 September 1889, begins:
- Paulsgrove Halt - now closed.
- Fareham first opened in 1841, as part of the Eastleigh–Fareham line. The lines to Portsmouth via Cosham and Southampton, via Netley, opened in 1848 and 1889 respectively. There were also junctions for Gosport (Note: This was the original connection between London and the Portsmouth area.) and to Alton via the Meon Valley – both are now closed.
- Netley was the original terminus of the Southampton and Netley Railway, built to serve the military hospital, which had its own short railway and station. The line from here to St Denys was originally single track; it was later doubled.
- Bitterne lay on the outskirts of Southampton; there was a passing point when the line was single track.
- With the junction at St Denys, the West Coastway Line joins the route of the South West Main Line.

In July 2022, Transport for the South East proposed that an underground line should be built to connect Southampton Central and Netley stations, thus shortening the travel time for services into Southampton Central, and which could reduce to travel time between Southampton and Portsmouth to under 35 minutes.

== Services ==
Three train operating companies run passenger trains on the West Coastway line between the following locations:

Southern:

- London Victoria and Portsmouth Harbour, via Chichester and Horsham
- London Victoria and Bognor Regis
- London Victoria and Littlehampton
- Brighton and Chichester
- Brighton and Portsmouth & Southsea
- Brighton and Southampton Central.

All of Southern's services on the line are operated by Class 377 Electrostar and Class 387 Electrostar electric multiple units. The trains between London Victoria & Bognor Regis and London Victoria & Portsmouth Harbour typically join or divide with each other during their journey, usually at Horsham but sometimes at Barnham (usually on Sundays). Until the 2024 service pattern change, there was a direct service between London Victoria & Southampton Central, which would alternatively join instead of the Portsmouth Harbour service. No other services on this line join and divide with each other.

South Western Railway:

- London Waterloo and Portsmouth Harbour
- Portsmouth & Southsea and Southampton Central.

Most of South Western Railway's services on the line are operated by Class 444 Desiro and Class 450 Desiro electric multiple units. Between Southampton Central and St Denys Class 158 Express Sprinter diesel multiple units are used for services from Southampton Central on other lines. The Class 158 diesel multiple units may pass through other parts of the West Coastway Line on empty coach stock (ECS) movements.

Great Western Railway:

- Portsmouth Harbour and Cardiff Central, via Southampton Central and Bristol Temple Meads.

All of Great Western Railway's services on the line are operated by Class 158 Express Sprinter, Class 165 Networker Turbo, and Class 166 Networker Turbo diesel multiple units.
