= Littlehampton railway station =

Railway station in West Sussex, England

Coordinates: 50°48′37″N 0°32′47″W

Littlehampton
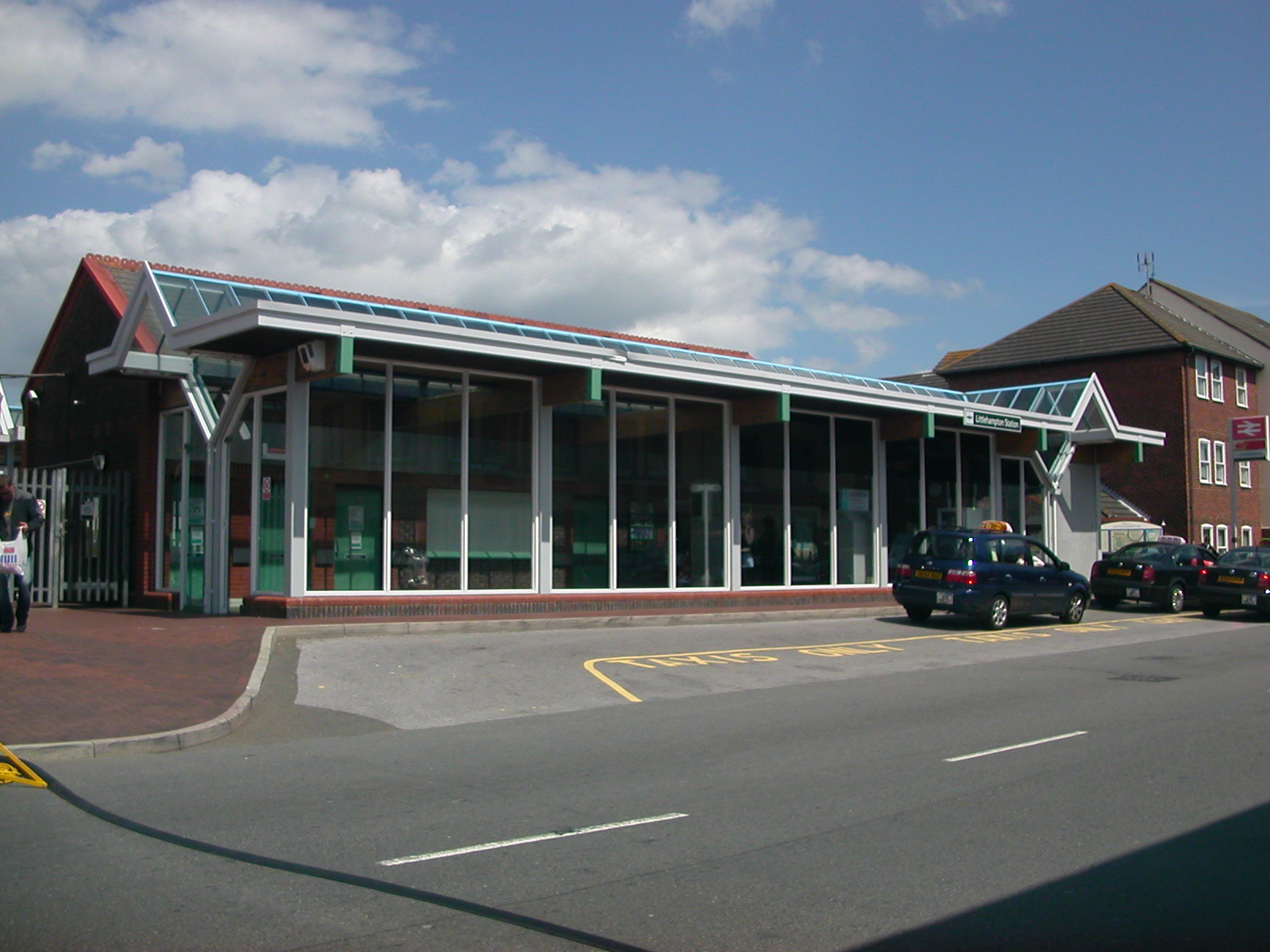

General information
- Location: Littlehampton, Arun district, England
- Grid reference: TQ025021
- Manager: Southern
- Platforms: 4

Other information
- Station code: LIT
- Classification: DfT category D

Key dates
- 17 August 1863: Opened
- 1887: Eastward spur
- 1937: Redeveloped
- 30 June 1938: electrified
- 1986 - 15 January 1988: NSE rebuild

Passengers
- 2020/21: ▼0.400 million
- Interchange: ▼1,526
- 2021/22: ▲0.780 million
- Interchange: ▲3,368
- 2022/23: ▲0.811 million
- Interchange: ▲4,149
- 2023/24: ▼0.797 million
- Interchange: ▲5,176
- 2024/25: ▲0.804 million
- Interchange: ▼890
Location
Notes
- Passenger statistics from the Office of Rail and Road

Littlehampton railway station serves the town of Littlehampton, in West Sussex, England. The station and the trains serving it are operated by Southern. It is a terminus at the end of a short branch off the West Coastway line.

== History ==
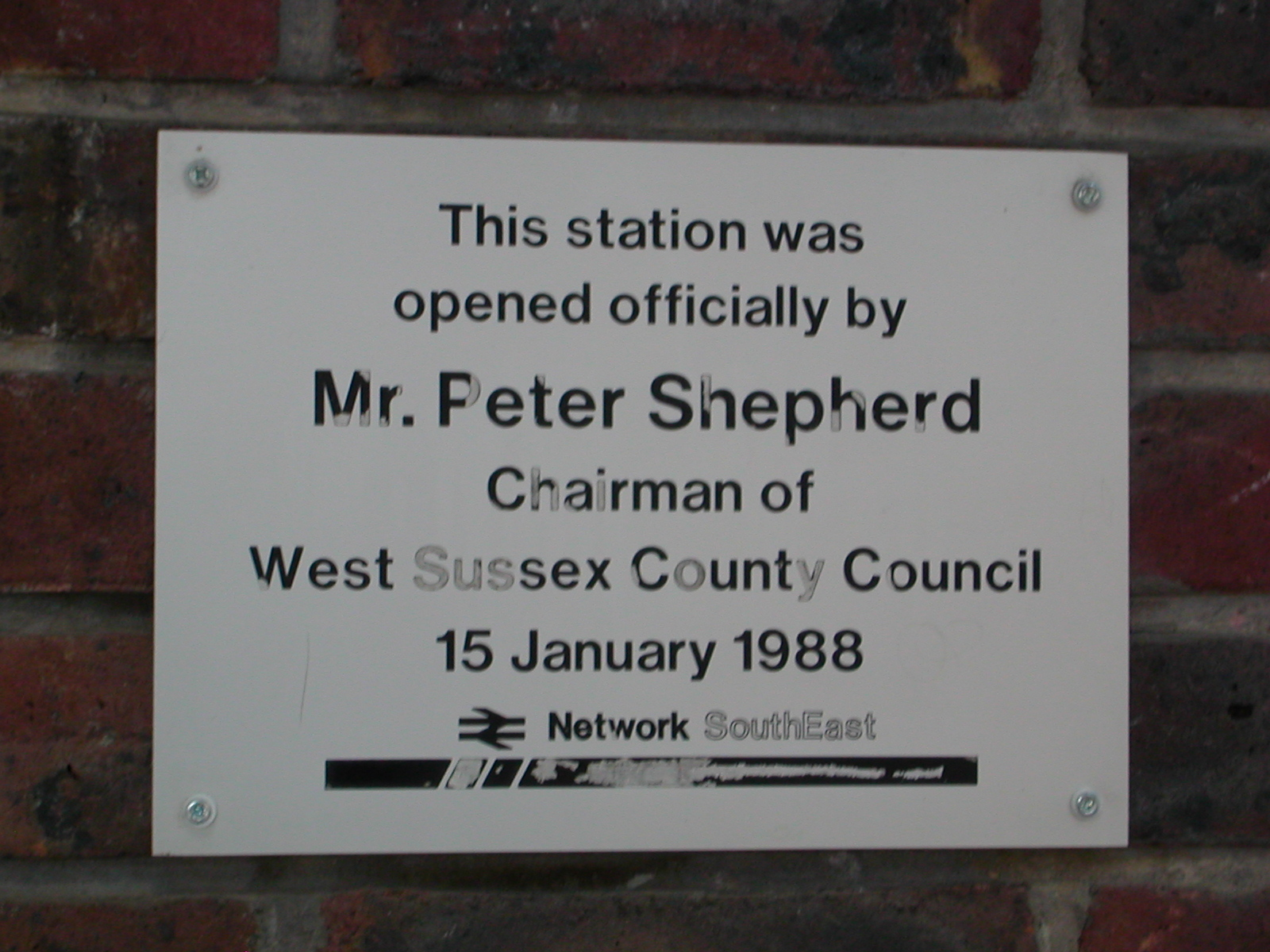
Plaque commemorating the opening of the new station building

A station called Arundel & Littlehampton opened in 1846 on the main Brighton–Portsmouth Line. This closed shortly after the branch line to the town itself opened in August 1863, when a west-facing connection was made at Ford Junction.

In 1887, the third side of the triangle was constructed, allowing through running from the lines from Horsham and Brighton. The south junction was named Littlehampton Junction, while the eastern connection was named Arundel Junction.

A station building similar to that at Arundel was provided; this lasted until 1937, after which redevelopment was severely delayed by the Second World War and planning disputes. One original structure remained until 1986, when Network SouthEast started building a new concourse and ticket office. This was finished late in 1987, and was officially unveiled on 15 January 1988. The line was electrified in 1938, with an official unveiling ceremony being held on 30 June 1938. The station handled goods traffic until 1970.

In 2021, the station received a Silent Soldier flat sculpture as a gift from East Preston Parish Council. The sculpture is placed by the trackside floral beds.

=== Accidents ===
- On 4 August 1920, the 13.10 train from Ford had a brake failure. The train hauled by D1 Class locomotive no. 360, hit the buffer stops, demolishing them, going through the station and Albert Road, eventually coming to rest in Franciscan Way. There were about thirty passengers in the train, of whom thirteen suffered from minor injuries, or from the effects of shock. The driver and fireman escaped injury by jumping from the foot-plate just before the collision occurred.
- On 30 November 1949, two passenger trains formed of electric multiple units collided at Littlehampton due to errors by a driver and guard on one of the trains and the Littlehampton signalman. Eleven people were injured.

=== Carriage shed and stabling sidings ===
A locomotive shed was also provided. Built with the station, it also went out of use in 1937 when the line was electrified. Currently in use at Littlehampton is a carriage shed used to store, maintain and clean Class 377 'Electrostars', more recently next to the shed, two more sidings have been fitted with waste disposal facilities to empty train toilets and are used to store trains over night. Two more sidings were constructed for train storage. Also present is a train washer and siding for trains to dry in. Light maintenance jobs can also be carried out on trains at Littlehampton.

== Facilities ==
The station has four platforms: two of which are of twelve-carriage length, the other two fit eight and seven carriages.

It has the following facilities:

- A ticket office, ticket machines and information points
- A buffet, waiting room, toilets and sheltered seating
- Bus stops, a car park with 38 spaces, bicycle storage and a taxi rank.

== Services ==
All services at Littlehampton are operated by Southern using Class 377 electric multiple units.

The typical off-peak service in trains per hour is:

- 2 tph to London Victoria, via Worthing
- 1 tph to Brighton, via Worthing
- 1 tph to Chichester.

During peak hours, two trains operate to and from London Bridge: one of which runs via Worthing and the other runs via Horsham.

On Sundays, the service to Brighton does not operate, the service to London Victoria is reduced to hourly and the hourly service to Chichester runs to Bognor Regis instead.

Preceding station	National Rail	Following station
Angmering	Southern; West Coastway line Littlehampton Branch	Terminus
Angmering	Southern; West Coastway line Littlehampton Branch	Ford
Arundel	Southern; Arun Valley line Peak hours only	Barnham
