= Leete =

Leete may refer to:

== People with the surname ==
- Alfred Leete (1882–1933), British graphic artist
- Andrew Leete Stone (1815–1892), American author and religious figure
- Art Leete (born 1969), Estonian ethnologist and folklorist
- Bernard Leete (1898–1978), English aviator
- Bill Leete (born c. 1944), American sportsman
- Harry Rickards, born Henry Leete (1843–1911), English performer
- Kai Leete (1910–1995), Estonian ballet and folk dancer
- William Leete (1612/13–1683), American colonial-era governor
- William Leete Stone, Sr. (1792/93–1844), American journalist and publisher
- William Leete Stone, Jr. (1835–1908), American journalist and historian

== Other uses ==
- the Leete Limestone, a geologic formation
- the Pelatiah Leete House, a historic building
- Leeteville, an inactive postal district once found in Ragtown, Nevada
- Doctor Leete, a character in the 1888 science-fiction novel Looking Backward
- In medieval England, an alternate spelling of a court leet
- An alternate spelling of leat
