= William A. Leet and Frederick Hassler Farmstead District =

Historic district in Iowa, United States

- U.S. National Register of Historic Places
- U.S. Historic district
- Location within Iowa Location within the United States
- Location: 12196 311th St. Manning, Iowa
- Coordinates: 41°54′19″N 95°02′58″W
- Area: 4.4 acres (1.8 ha)
- Built: 1916-1917
- Built by: Hans Detlefsen; Fritz Thorns
- Architectural style: Bungalow; American Craftsman
- NRHP reference No.: 99000526
- Added to NRHP: May 5, 1999

The William A. Leet and Frederick Hassler Farmstead District, also known as the Leet/Hassler Farmstead or Glenhaven, is a nationally recognized historic district located in Manning, Iowa, United States. It was listed on the National Register of Historic Places in 1999. At the time of its nomination it contained 12 resources, which included four contributing buildings, three contributing structures, four contributing objects, and one non-contributing building.

William A. Leet owned this farm from 1915 to 1918. During that time the Bungalow/American Craftsman-style house, matching three-bay garage, and the gambrel-roofed frame barn were built. Both were constructed by local builders Hans Detlefsen and Fritz Thorns. They were meant to invoke the wealth of the owner, which may have been his undoing, as Leet squandered his money and lost his estate and his wife to divorce. He lost the farm to his farm manager Frederick H. Hassler. Hassler owned the farm from 1918 to 1936, when he lost it as a result of the Great Depression. The rest of the historic farm buildings, structures and objects were built during his ownership. The corn crib, built in 1943, is the non-contributing building because it was built after the period of significance.

During the Leet-Hassler ownership, the farm was known for its Poland China hog operation. Known as the "Fashion Herd" by the 1920s, Hassler's hogs were sold to other operations around the country and were the basis for other famous herds. The farm is now a part of the Manning Hausbarn Heritage Park. The farmstead has been restored to the period of its historic significance.
