= Portsmouth Harbour railway station =

Railway station in Hampshire, England

Coordinates: 50.79714°N 1.107044°W

Portsmouth Harbour
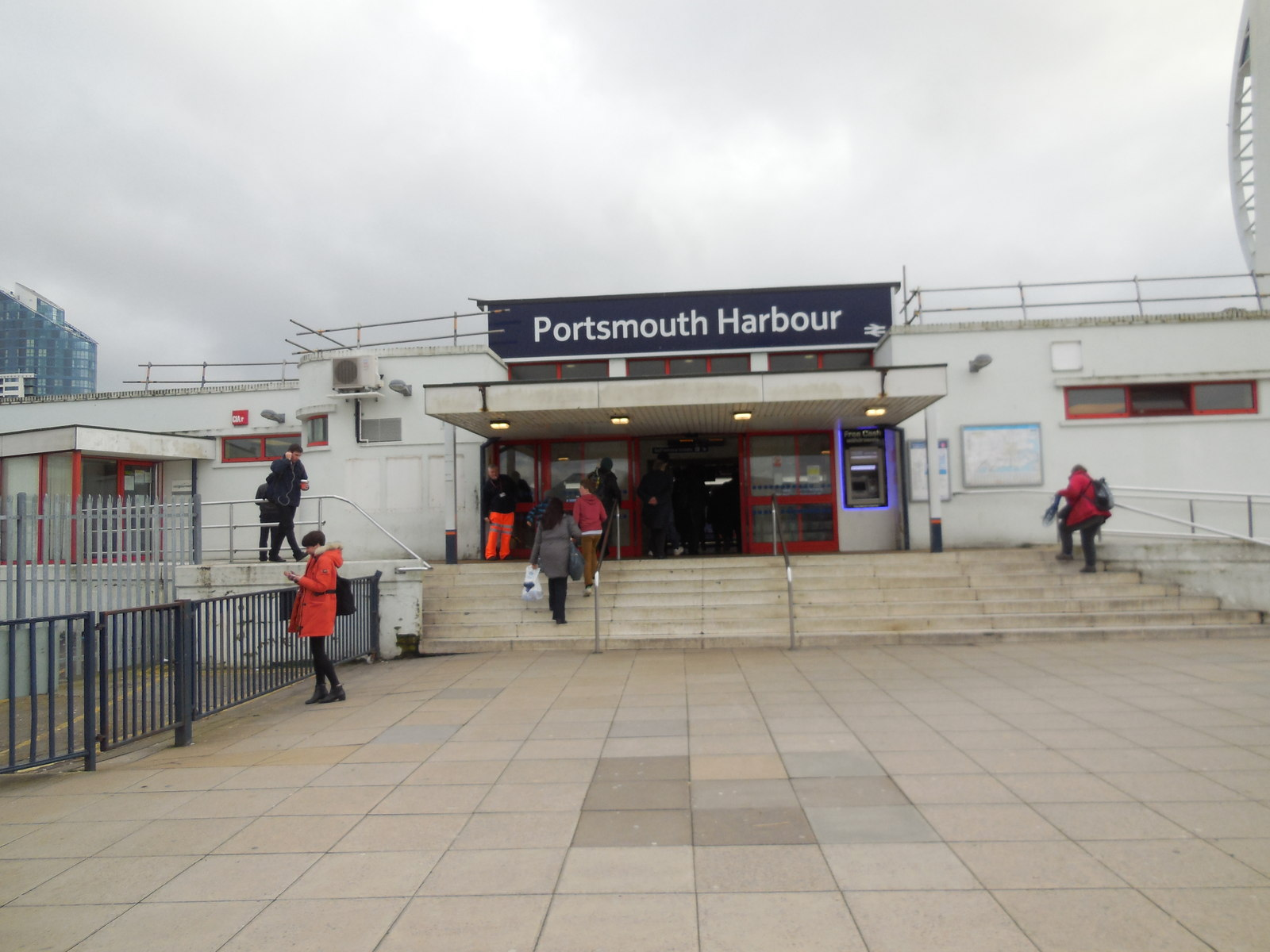
- The station entrance (February 2014)

General information
- Location: Portsmouth, Hampshire, England
- Grid reference: SU629000
- Managed by: South Western Railway
- Platforms: 5 (4 in use)

Other information
- Station code: PMH
- Classification: DfT category C1

History
- Opened: 2 October 1876
- Original company: Portsmouth and Ryde Joint Railway
- Pre-grouping: Portsmouth and Ryde Joint Railway
- Post-grouping: Southern Railway

Passengers
- 2020/21: ▼0.540 million
- Interchange: ▼14,576
- 2021/22: ▲1.455 million
- Interchange: ▲41,024
- 2022/23: ▲1.747 million
- Interchange: ▼12,920
- 2023/24: ▲1.776 million
- Interchange: ▲45,145
- 2024/25: ▲2.091 million
- Interchange: ▼44,300
Location
Notes
- Passenger statistics from the Office of Rail and Road

Portsmouth Harbour railway station serves the city of Portsmouth, in Hampshire, England. It is situated in Portsmouth Harbour, between the Gunwharf Quays shopping centre and the Historic Dockyard. It is an important transport terminal, with a bus interchange and ferry services to Gosport and the Isle of Wight. Unusually for a main line railway station, it is built over water as the station was originally constructed on wooden piles, which were later replaced by iron supports.

== History ==
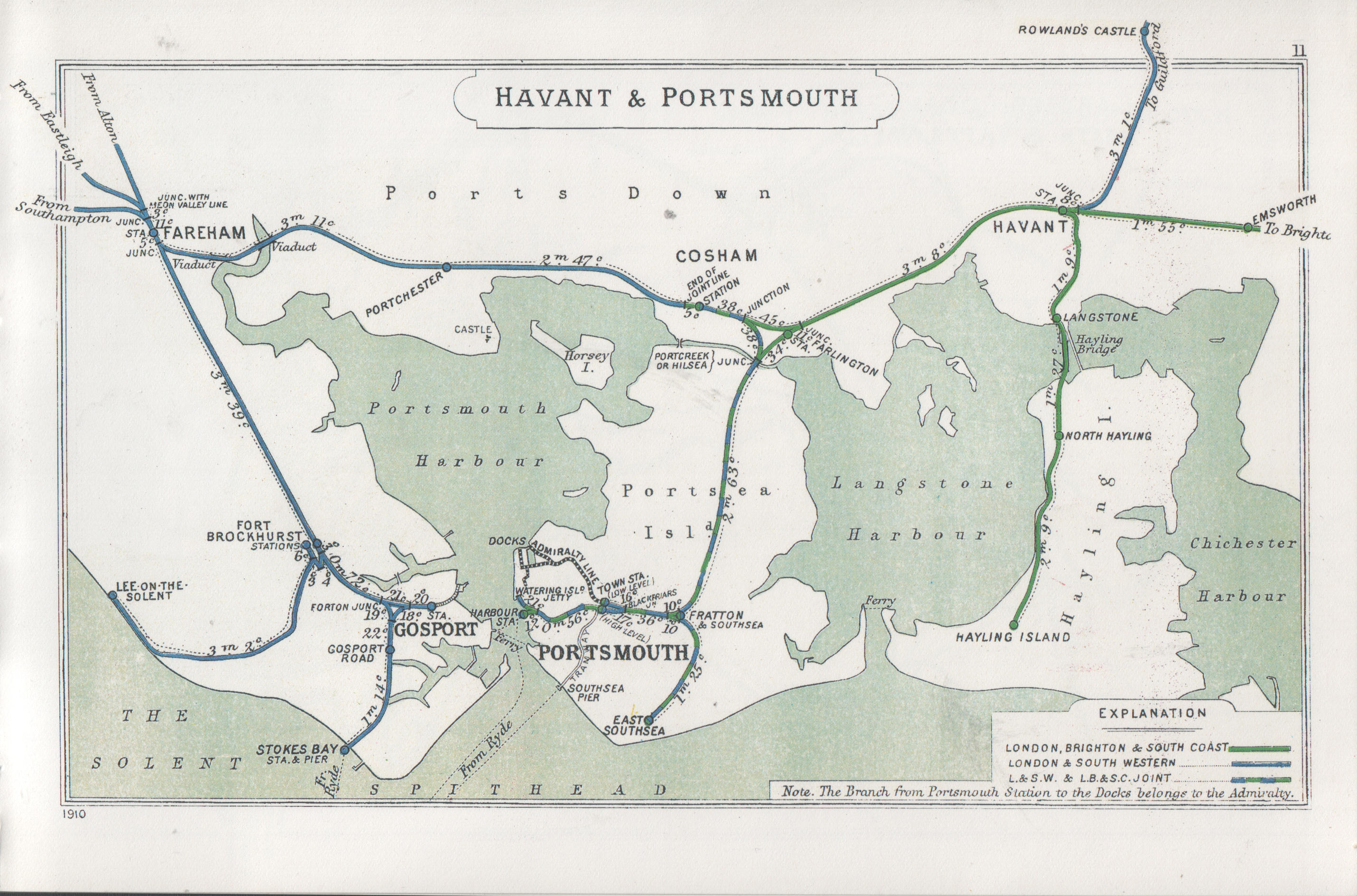
A 1910 Railway Clearing House Junction Diagram showing railways in the vicinity of Portsmouth Harbour (lower left centre)

The station opened on 2 October 1876 as the terminus of Chief Engineer Frederick Banister's Portsmouth Waterside Extension to the Portsmouth Direct line, which runs between this station and London Waterloo station. The construction of the station superseded an earlier pier on the site called the Albert Pier that was used for passenger steamships in the mid-Victorian era.

The station was rebuilt in 1937 when the route was electrified but was almost totally destroyed during World War II by fire after German bombing, then rebuilt after the war.

A short branch line built on piles used to connect the station to the neighbouring dockyard, but this was taken out of service when a German bomb damaged the swing bridge in 1941.

== Accidents and incidents ==
- c.1928, T9 class locomotive No. 337 was derailed on the approach to the station, blocking all lines.
- 16 September 1913, Frederick Potter, worked as Shunter. Potter went between the coaches and the engine, he failed to couple them on the first try, as the nudge from the loco pushed the coaches forward slightly. During this, he got his foot caught in points. Before he could get free, the leading wheel of the tender caught and crushed his leg.

== Facilities ==
The station is owned by Network Rail and is managed by South Western Railway. It currently has four platforms in use: numbered 1, 3, 4 and 5. Platform 2 is no longer in use, having been decommissioned in the early 1990s following major repair and refurbishment work to the pier that the platforms sit on.

The ticket office is located in the booking hall, at the entrance from the ferry terminal. It is open seven days a week, until 19:00. When closed, tickets must be bought prior to travel at the ticket machines or on-line. There are customer help points. The station has 38 bicycle spaces, but no car park.

== Services ==
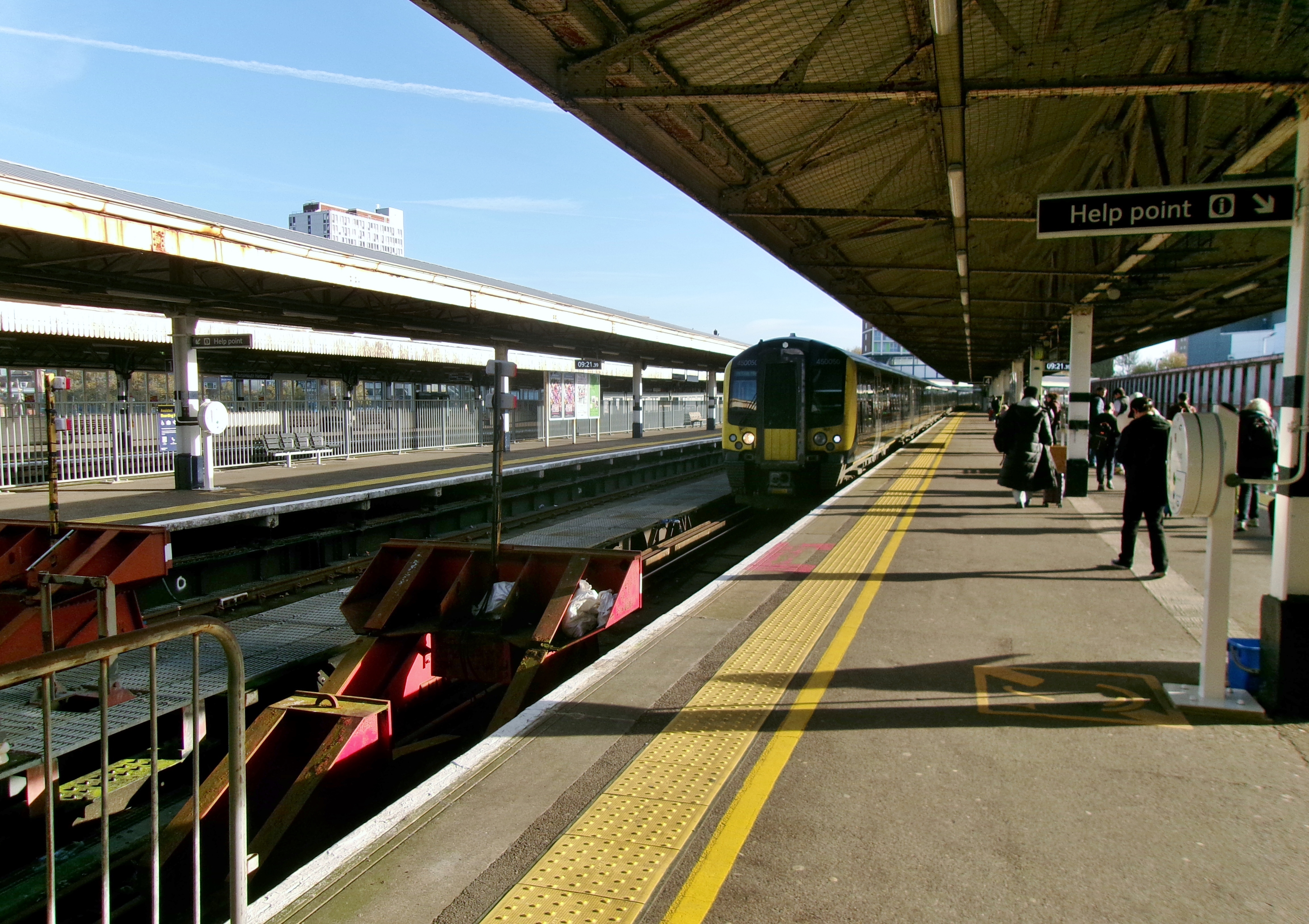
View of the platforms

The station is served by a number of train operators. South Western Railway operate two services to London Waterloo, one on the Portsmouth Direct Line (via Guildford) and the other via Fareham, Winchester and Basingstoke. They also operate local trains to Southampton Central.

There are train services along the West Coastway route, operated by Southern to Brighton, Littlehampton, Gatwick Airport, East Croydon and London Victoria. Great Western Railway operate trains via Southampton, Salisbury and Bristol Temple Meads to Cardiff Central, via the Wessex Main Line.

The ferry from Portsmouth Harbour Station to Ryde on the Isle of Wight is operated by Wightlink. National Rail tickets between the stations on the Isle of Wight (continuing on the Island Line at Ryde Pier Head) and stations on Great Britain include travel on the ferry.

The Monday-Saturday off peak rail service in trains per hour (tph) and trains per day (tpd) is as follows:

- Southern
  - 2tph to London Victoria via Horsham
  - 3tpd to Littlehampton, of which 1tpd continues to Brighton
- Great Western Railway
  - 1tph to Cardiff Central via Southampton Central and Bristol Temple Meads
- South Western Railway
  - 2tph to London Waterloo via Guildford
  - 1tph to London Waterloo via Basingstoke

Preceding station	National Rail	Following station
Portsmouth & Southsea	South Western Railway; Portsmouth Direct line West Coastway line	Terminus
Portsmouth & Southsea	Southern; West Coastway line	Terminus
Portsmouth & Southsea	Great Western Railway; West Coastway line	Terminus
	Ferry services	
Terminus	Wightlink; Ferry	Fishbourne
Terminus	Wightlink; High-speed catamaran	Ryde Pier Head
Terminus	Gosport Ferry; Passenger ferry	Gosport
Connection to Portsmouth International Port for Brittany Ferries to France/Spain/Guernsey, and DFDS Seaways to Jersey

== Former services ==
The station was served by Virgin CrossCountry until May 2003 with services to and from Liverpool and Manchester with InterCity 125 sets and in its last years, Class 220 Voyagers and Class 221 Super Voyagers.

The station was also served by Wessex Trains with one train a day to and from Penzance, as well as the services that are now run by its successor Great Western Railway.

== Future ==
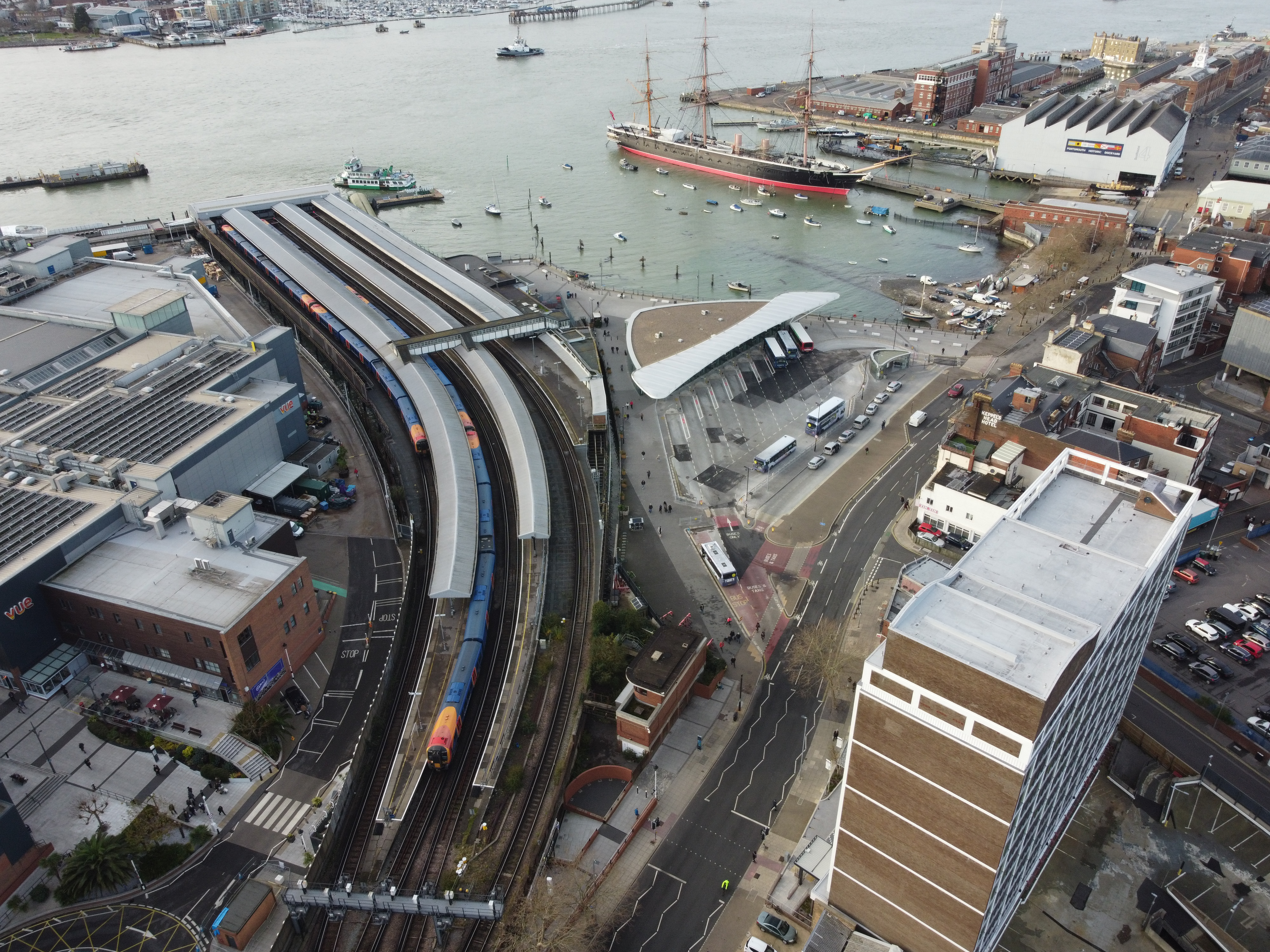
Portsmouth Harbour railway station and the Hard Interchange

Entrance to Portsmouth Harbour railway station in 2025

With the award of the South West Region franchise to South Western Railway in 2017, Portsmouth City Council announced the intention to "spruce up" the station as part of a £90 million investment by the new operating company. Potential improvements could include a direct walking route into the Gunwharf Quays shopping complex.
