= Swaythling railway station =

Railway station in Hampshire, England

Swaythling
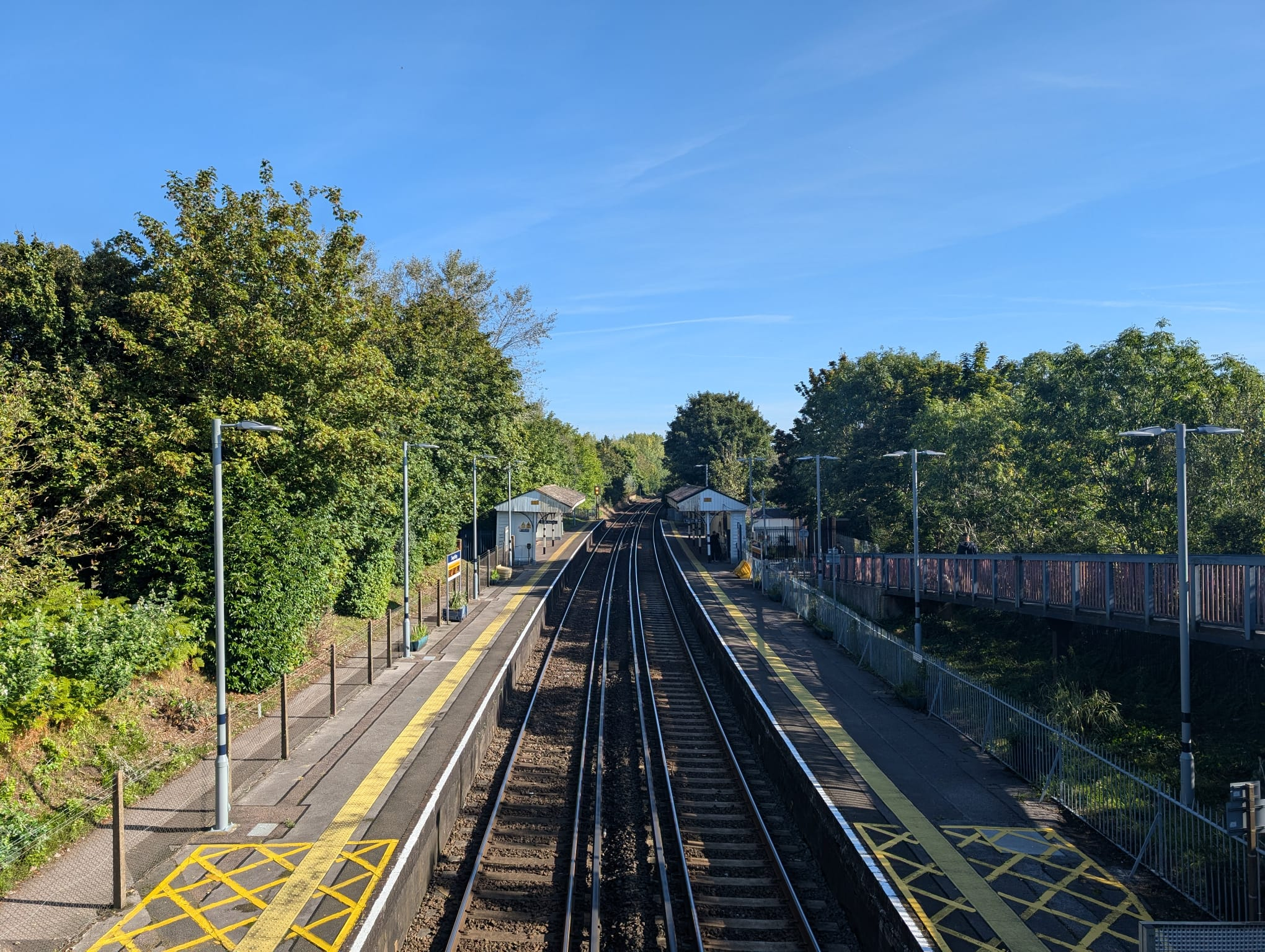
- Swaythling station platforms from the footbridge

General information
- Location: Swaythling, City of Southampton; England
- Coordinates: 50.9411°N 1.3765°W
- Grid reference: SU439159
- Managed by: South Western Railway
- Platforms: 2

Other information
- Station code: SWG
- Classification: DfT category E

History
- Opened: 15 October 1883

Passengers
- 2020/21: ▼23,694
- 2021/22: ▲57,640
- 2022/23: ▲63,280
- 2023/24: ▲74,006
- 2024/25: ▲74,572
Location
Notes
- Passenger statistics from the Office of Rail and Road

Swaythling railway station is on the South West Main Line on the northern edge of Southampton in Hampshire, England, serving the area of Swaythling. It is 75 miles 56 chains (121.8 km) down the line from London Waterloo.

== History ==
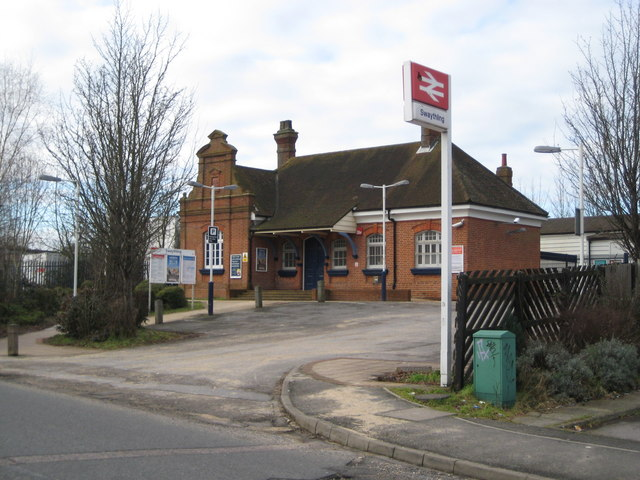
Swaythling railway station.

Swaythling station was initially constructed in 1883 in an elaborate Neo-Flemish style and is a grade II listed building. The left side has a Flemish gable with central pediment and ball finials and includes a date tablet. The station building was set back to the east of the down platform – and connected to the platform canopy structure by a passageway – so that it would not have to be rebuilt in the event of the double track being widened to quadruple tracking, which was envisaged in 1883 but has never taken place.

On 19 January 1941, during the Second World War, a 2,000-pound (907 kg) bomb fell on the station, through both the roof and floor of the booking office. The bomb did not explode, but the impact killed the leading porter's dog (who was asleep in a cupboard) and scattered burning coals from the hearth, causing a fire. The fire led officials to believe the bomb had exploded and the station was declared safe for reoccupation the next day, until the landlord of the nearby Mason's Arms pub raised the alarm since he had not heard the bomb explode. The bomb was then dug up and made safe.

== Train services ==
Currently operated by South Western Railway, it is served by the hourly Salisbury to Romsey via Southampton and Eastleigh service. There are additional services at peak times to Basingstoke, Winchester, London Waterloo, Southampton and Brockenhurst.

== Facilities ==
Step-free access is available only to the down platform (usually for trains to Salisbury via Southampton Central and Romsey). This platform has the ticket office (open weekday mornings only), a ticket vending machine and step-free access to a footbridge crossing the railway. The up platform contains steps to the footbridge and steps down to Stoneham Way.

== Friends of Swaythling Station ==
A community group, the Friends of Swaythling Station, was formed in October 2009 and won first prize in the Best Station Adoption Group category at the 2011 Association of Community Rail Partnerships awards.

Preceding station	National Rail	Following station
Southampton Airport; Parkway	South Western Railway; Salisbury to Romsey via Southampton and Eastleigh	St Denys
