= Millbrook railway station (Hampshire) =

Railway station in Hampshire, England

Coordinates: 50°54′42″N 1°26′03″W

Millbrook
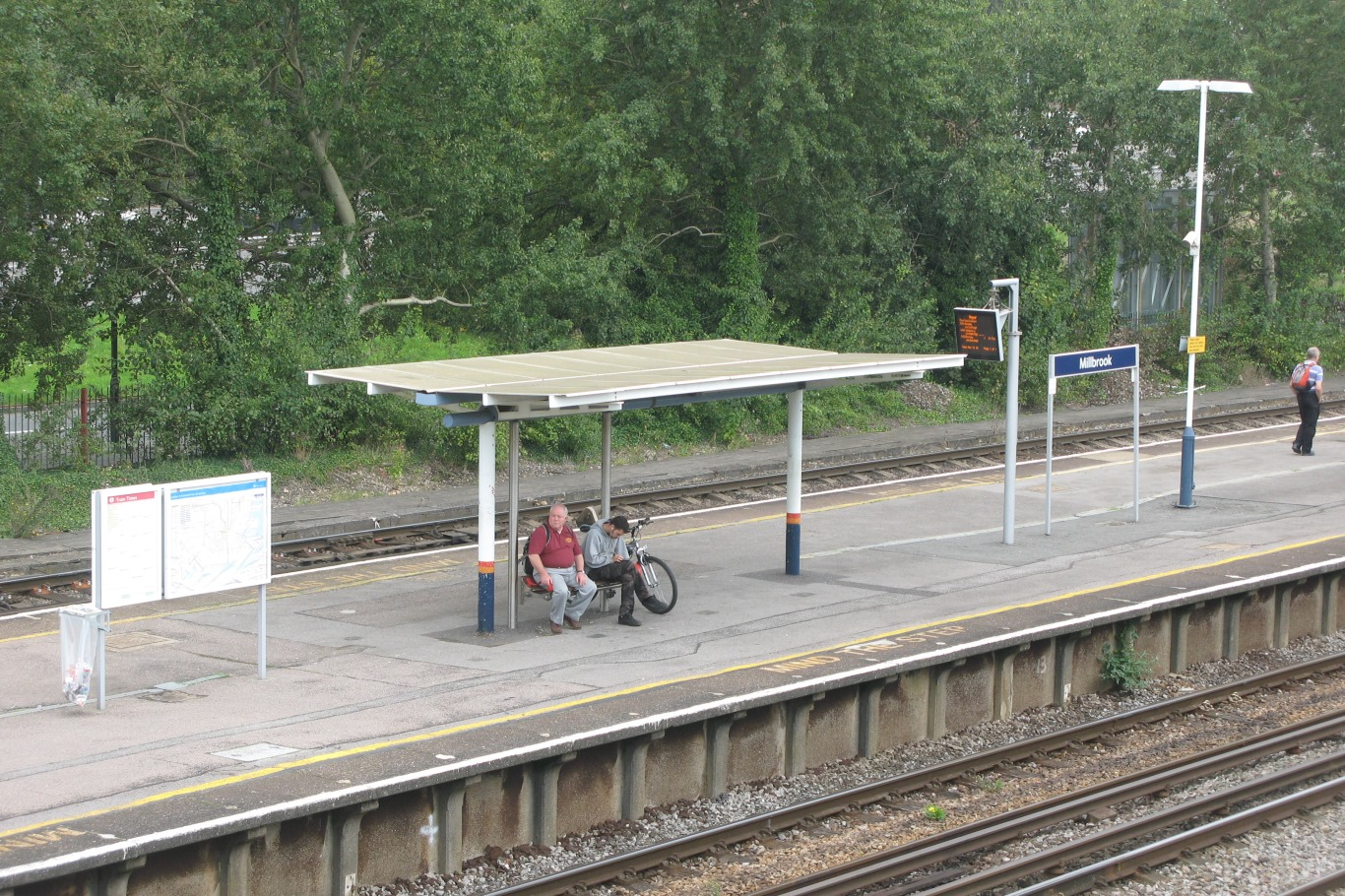

General information
- Location: Millbrook, City of Southampton; England
- Grid reference: SU398125
- Manager: South Western Railway
- Platforms: 2

Other information
- Station code: MBK
- Classification: DfT category F2

History
- Opened: 1 November 1861

Passengers
- 2021/22: ▲20,988
- 2022/23: ▲25,426
- 2023/24: ▲29,128
- 2024/25: ▲36,446
- 2025/26: ▲38,230
Location
Notes
- Passenger statistics from the Office of Rail and Road

Millbrook railway station is a small station in the Millbrook area of Southampton, England. It is served mainly by the Salisbury to Romsey stopping service. This service runs once per hour in each direction.

It is 80 miles 11 chains (129 km) down the line from London Waterloo. The station is managed by South Western Railway. The platforms face the slow lines only, there are no platforms for the fast lines.

Millbrook Freightliner Terminal is located next to the station on the up side. A car terminal and rail access to Southampton's Western Docks can be seen from the down side of the station.

== History ==
The station was rebuilt as an island platform in 1935.

In summer 2021, works were undertaken to improve the footbridge that connects the island platform with Millbrook Road West. Southampton city council was able to use the rebuild to remove two steps at the northern end where the bridge joins Foundry Lane and replace them with a ramp. Limited space and a large volume of underground utilities meant Network rail left the southern end at the station steps only.

== Services ==
The typical off-peak service in trains per hour is:

- 1 tph to Salisbury via Romsey
- 1 tph to Romsey via Chandler's Ford

Preceding station	National Rail	Following station
Southampton Central	South Western Railway; Wessex Main Line	Redbridge
	Historical railways	
Southampton	London & South Western Railway; Andover and Redbridge railway	Redbridge
