= Eastleigh =

Town in Hampshire, England

Coordinates: 50°58′00″N 1°21′00″W

- Town
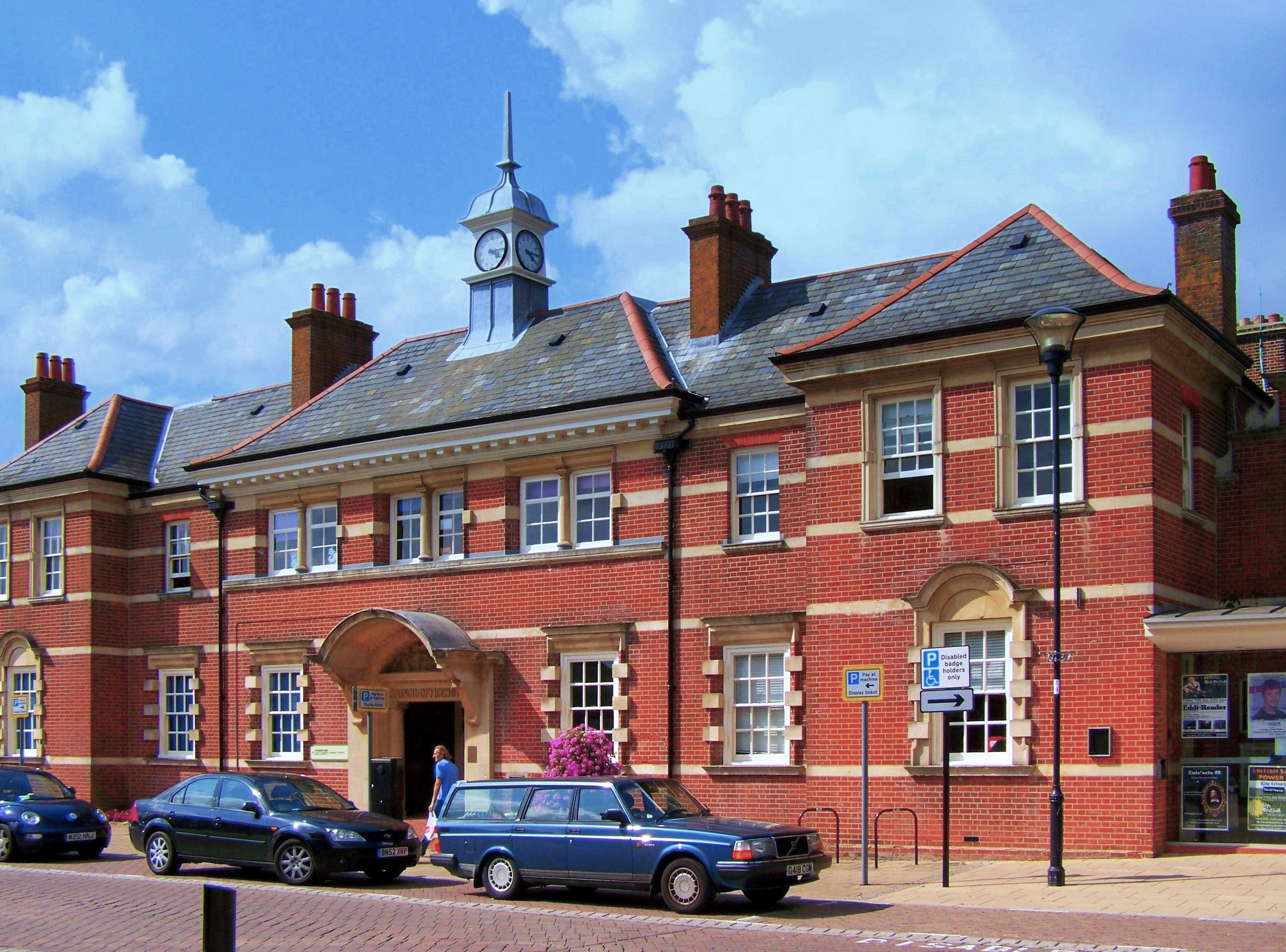
- The Point, Eastleigh's old town hall

- Location within Hampshire
- Population: 24,011 (unparished area, 2011 census)
- OS grid reference: SU4563818844
- Civil parish: Eastleigh Town
- District: Eastleigh
- Shire county: Hampshire
- Region: South East
- Country: England
- Sovereign state: United Kingdom
- Post town: EASTLEIGH
- Postcode district: SO50
- Dialling code: 023
- Police: Hampshire and Isle of Wight
- Fire: Hampshire and Isle of Wight
- Ambulance: South Central
- UK Parliament: Eastleigh
- Website: eastleigh-tc.gov.uk

Eastleigh is a town in Hampshire, England, between Southampton and Winchester. It is the largest town and the administrative seat of the Borough of Eastleigh, with a population of 24,011 at the 2011 census.

The town lies on the River Itchen, one of England's premier chalk streams for fly fishing, and a designated site of Special Scientific Interest. The area was originally villages until the 19th century, when Eastleigh was developed as a railway town by the London and South Western Railway.

== History ==
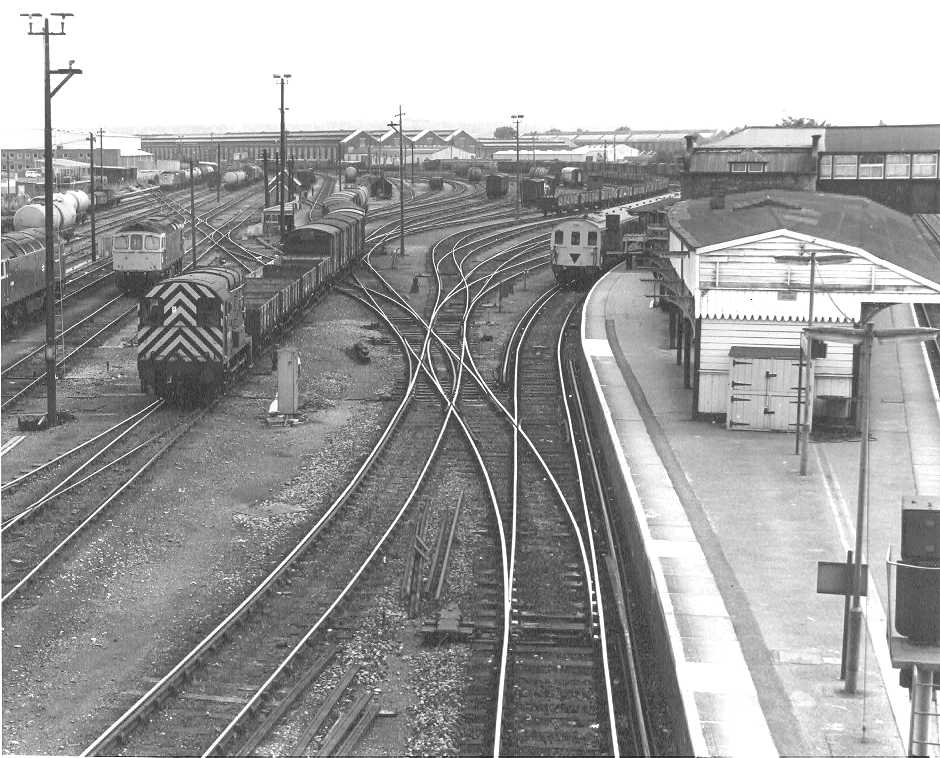
Eastleigh rail yard in 1984

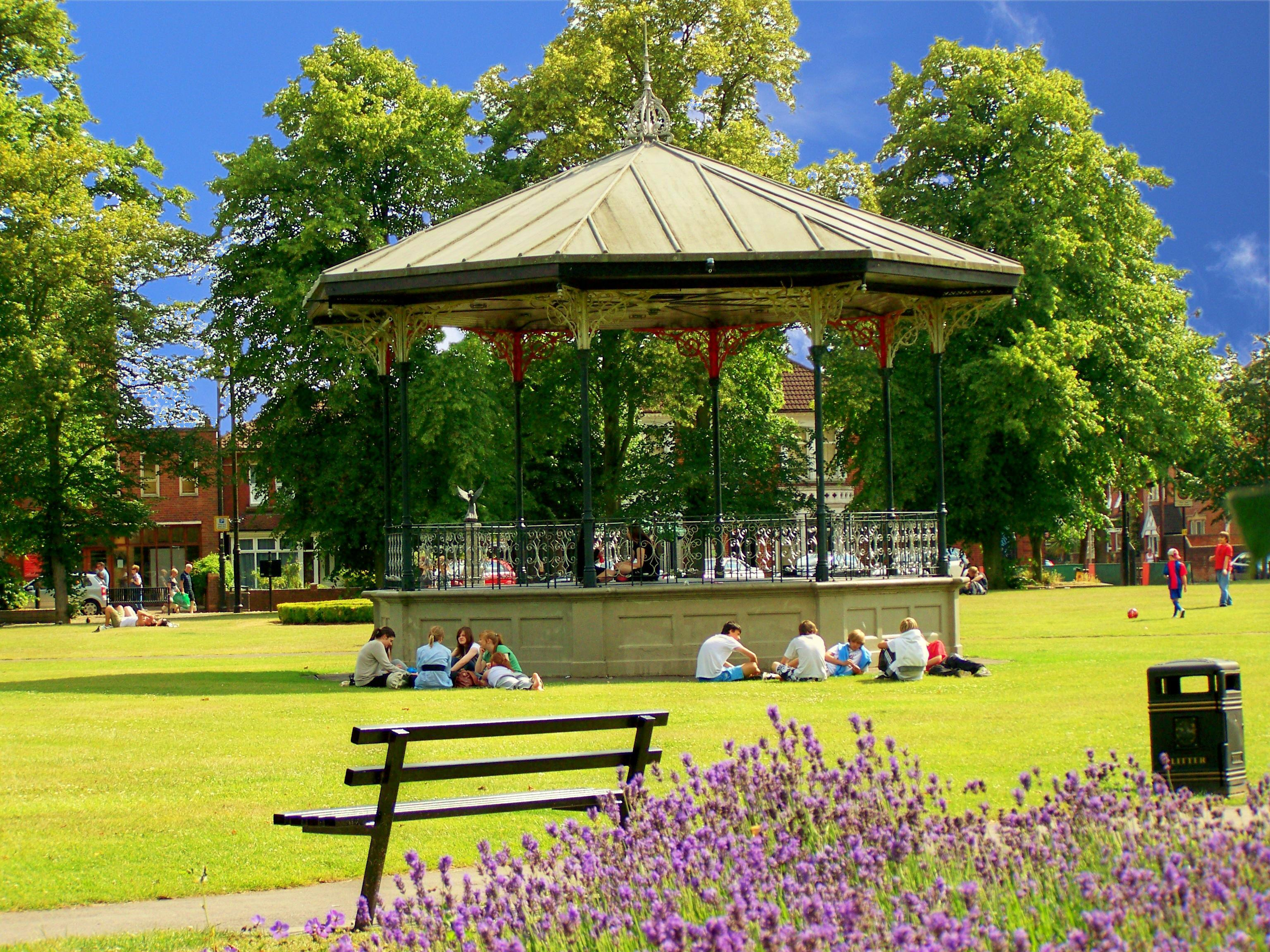
Victorian bandstand in the recreation ground

The modern town of Eastleigh lies on the old Roman road, built in A.D.79 between Winchester (Venta Belgarum) and Bitterne (Clausentum). Roman remains discovered in the Eastleigh area, including a Roman lead coffin excavated in 1908, indicate that a settlement probably existed here in Roman times.

A Saxon village called 'East Leah' has been recorded to have existed since 932 AD. ('Leah' is an ancient Anglo-Saxon word meaning 'a clearing in a forest'). There is additional evidence of this settlement in a survey from the time which details land in North Stoneham being granted by King Æthelstan to his military aid, Alfred in 932 AD. The prefix 'Est' or 'East' is thought to refer to its location relative to the established settlement of Baddesley.

The Domesday Book of 1086 gives a more detailed account of the settlement, which is referred to as 'Estleie'.

In 1838, the London and South Western Railway Company (L&SWR) built a railway from Southampton to Winchester. It was decided to build a station near the little village of Barton; this railway station was originally named Bishopstoke Junction. In 1868, the villages of Barton and Eastley were combined into one parish. A parish church, the Church of the Resurrection, was built in the same year at a cost of £2,300. A local noted author of many novels, Charlotte Yonge, donated £500 towards the building of the church. She was rewarded by being given the privilege to choose a name for the 'new' parish: either Barton or Eastly. She chose Eastly, but with a new modern spelling: Eastleigh. In 1891, the L&SWR Carriage and Wagon Works from Nine Elms in London were transferred to Eastleigh; this was followed by the Nine Elms Locomotive Works, which were moved there in 1909. These railway works were closed in 2006 but have since reopened, albeit on a smaller scale.

Eastleigh has seen a rapid and controlled expansion in residential, industrial and commercial development over recent years. The borough of Eastleigh was ranked the "9th best place to live in the UK 2006" by a Channel 4 programme.

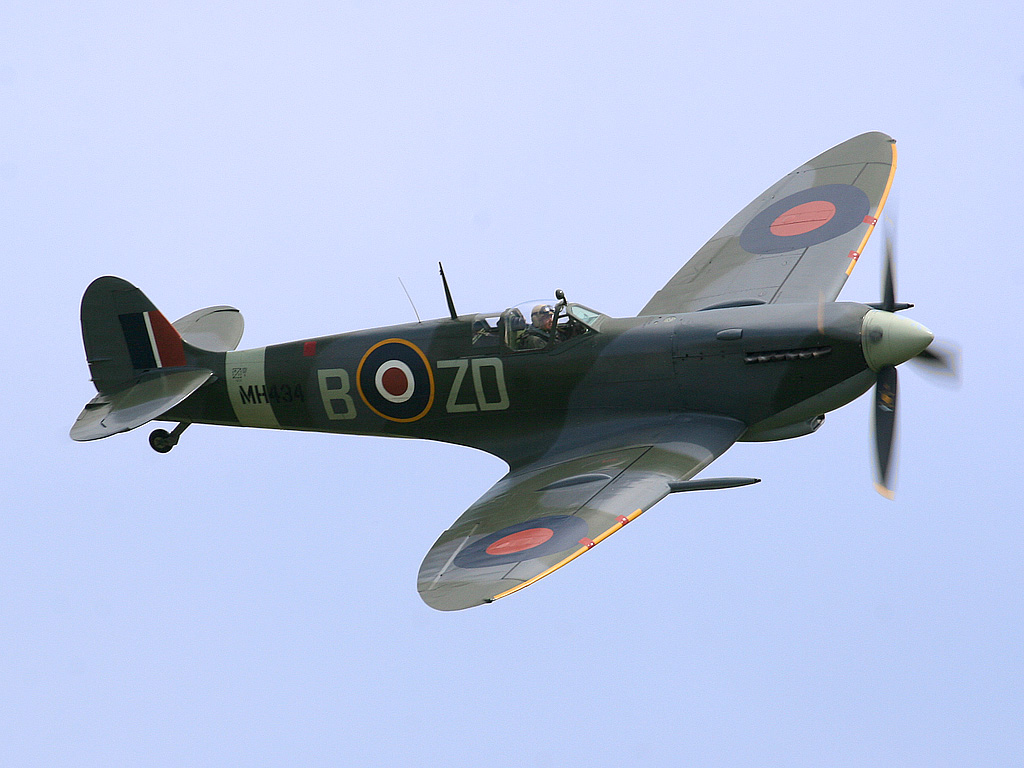
Supermarine Spitfire Mk IX

The United States Navy established a naval air station on 23 July 1918 to assemble and repair Caproni Ca.5 and Airco DH.4 and DH.9 bombers for the Northern Bombing Group of the First World War. The base closed shortly after the First Armistice at Compiègne. Perhaps Eastleigh's best-known resident is the Spitfire aeroplane, which was built in Southampton and first flown from Eastleigh Aerodrome. A replica has recently been placed on the roundabout at the entrance to the airport.

Eastleigh Museum, which is to be found in the High Street, holds information about the town and the surrounding villages, including Bishopstoke which had been the largest residential area.

== Education ==
Eastleigh has two further education colleges: Barton Peveril Sixth Form College (where Colin Firth was a pupil) and Eastleigh College (both on the same road). Crestwood Community School is the secondary school for the town, and primary schools include Cherbourg Primary School, Norwood Primary School, Nightingale Primary School, the Crescent Primary School and Shakespeare Infant and Junior Schools to the north of the town.

== Religion ==
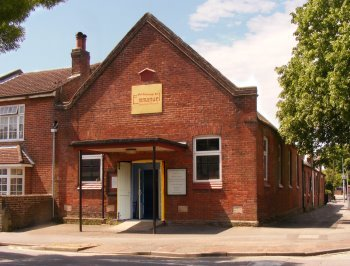
Emmanuel Baptist Church

The Anglican parish church is All Saints in Desborough Road. The Roman Catholic Church of the Holy Cross was built in Leigh Road in 1902 to replace an early tin church. Emmanuel Baptist Church was founded in the early 1930s, in the former Desborough Mission Hall in Desborough Road. The building dates to 1905.

Eastleigh Baptist Church is situated in Wells Place and was previously called Union Baptist Church. Adjacent to the main church building is the Wells Place Centre, built on the site of a former dairy which itself replaced a bacon factory.

St Andrew's Methodist Church is located in Blenheim Road.

Junction Church has premises in Eastleigh's High Street and Thrive Church meets at the Pavilion on the Park.

== Politics ==
Eastleigh is represented in the House of Commons by the Liberal Democrat MP Liz Jarvis, who was elected in 2024.

Eastleigh Borough Council currently has 34 Liberal Democrats, 3 independents and 2 Conservative councillors. On 1 April 2021, the town of Eastleigh became a civil parish, having previously been an unparished area within the borough.

== Economy ==
The B&Q head office is on Chestnut Avenue in Chandler's Ford. The town was formerly home to a Mr Kipling bakery.

Eastleigh is also home to a manufacturing plant owned by Prysmian Cables & Systems.

The Swan Shopping Centre opened in 1989. It was built in the heart of the town's Victorian 'grid iron' road layout and blocked off Market Street and High Street; through access was possible for pedestrians while the centre was open. It included a French-style café and a new library, which replaced the former library situated in the Park, now used as part of The Point.

== Transport ==
=== Railway ===
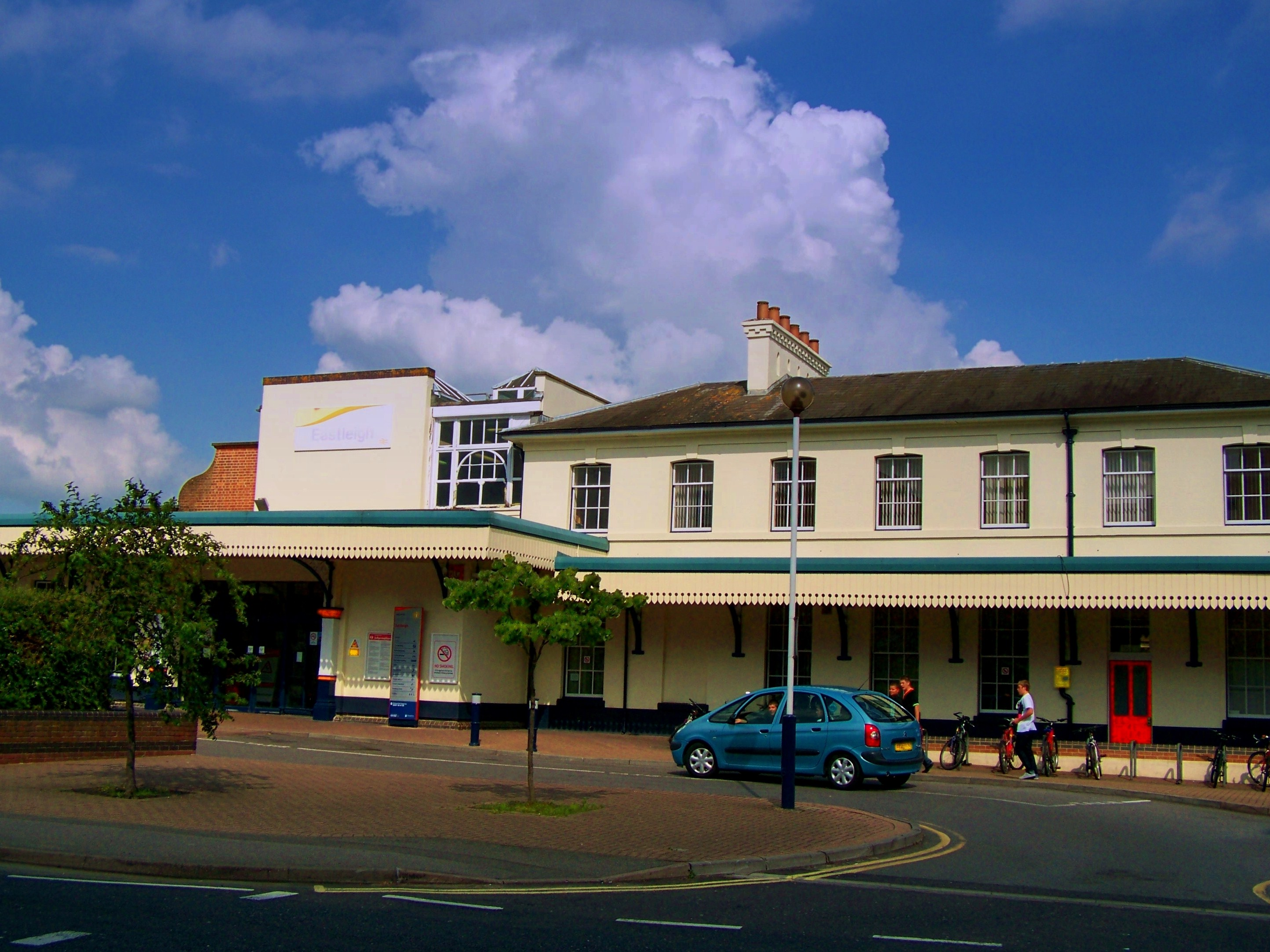
Eastleigh railway station in 2009

Eastleigh railway station is sited at a junction of three routes:

- South West Main Line links London Waterloo, Winchester, Southampton Central, Bournemouth, Poole and Weymouth. South Western Railway operates services on this route.
- Eastleigh–Fareham line: services between London Waterloo and Portsmouth Harbour take this route, bypassing Southampton; trains are operated by South Western Railway. Three services per day, operated by Southern, use this route to connect Brighton with Southampton Central; Great Western Railway runs two late night services between Portsmouth Harbour, Bristol Temple Meads and Cardiff Central.
- Eastleigh–Romsey line: services between Romsey and Salisbury are provided by South Western Railway.

Eastleigh Works is sited to the south of the station.

=== Buses ===
Eastleigh's bus services are operated primarily by Bluestar; routes connect the town with Chandlers Ford, Hedge End, Romsey, Southampton and Southampton Airport.

=== Road ===
Eastleigh is located close to the junction between the M3 and M27 motorways, giving easy road access to London, Southampton, Winchester, Bournemouth and Portsmouth.

=== Air ===
Southampton Airport is located in Eastleigh; it is the 20th largest airport in the UK. The airport is served by a dedicated main line railway station, Southampton Airport Parkway, which is the next station stop south (5 minutes) from Eastleigh. Its airport codes are (IATA: SOU, ICAO: EGHI).

== Sport ==
Eastleigh F.C. is the town's sole senior football team, playing in the National League as well as entering the FA Cup and the FA Trophy. They are known as The Spitfires.

Solent Kestrels are the town and area's basketball club. They compete in the English Basketball League Division 1, the second highest level of the sport in the country, behind the nationwide British Basketball League. The team were promoted to Division 1 in 2016, after finishing as champions of Division 2 in the 2015–16 season. They are coached by Matt Guymon and play home games at the Fleming Park Leisure Centre.

Eastleigh Ladies Hockey Club is based in South Hampshire. It fields two teams in the Hampshire Women's League (playing Saturdays), as well as playing floodlit and indoor league games (playing on weekdays).

Eastleigh Rugby Football Club play from the Hub in Eastleigh. They currently have four senior sides, colts and young player development; their 1st XV currently play in the London 2 South West. Also based at the Hub are the Hurricanes, a team for young adults with learning difficulties.

Eastleigh Running Club is also based in the town.

Eastleigh Swim Club provides swimming lessons, pool and land training sessions and competitions for young people and adults. The club is primarily based at Places Leisure; it also provides lessons and training at Oaklands Pool in Southampton.

== Notable people ==
Famous people linked to Eastleigh include the painter Mary Beale, Chrystabel Leighton-Porter, the model for the Second World War cartoon character Jane, and Benny Hill who all lived in the town.

Hill's first job was at Woolworths on Leigh Road. He then moved on to be a milkman for Hanns Dairies, on Factory Road, now Wells Place. His time working in Eastleigh on a horse-drawn milk float gave him his inspiration for his hit record, "Ernie, The Fastest Milkman In The West". In Hill's honour, a plaque has been put up close to the site of the now demolished Hanns Dairies building and a new road has been named Benny Hill Close, though many of the people who had bought the new homes were not happy with the decision. An alternative suggestion was Cowpat Lane.

Sir Arthur Young, the eminent chief of police, was born at 55 Chamberlayne Road in 1907. Sporting notables include Tommy Green who won an Olympic Gold Medal at the 1932 Los Angeles Games in the 50K walk, and Vince Hawkins who was British Middleweight Boxing Champion in the late 1940s.

Other notable residents of Eastleigh include:

- Heinz Burt (1942–2000) (pop-musician)
- Scott Mills (1973–present) (Radio 2 DJ)
- Stephen Gough (the 'Naked Rambler')
- Giz Watson (Australian politician)
- Nirmal Purja (1983-2026) (Mountaineer)
- Paige Wooding (professional wrestler known as Jamie Hayter)

== Twin towns and sister cities ==
Eastleigh is twinned with:

- Villeneuve-Saint-Georges, France
- Kornwestheim, Germany

It has a "sister city" relationship with Temple Terrace, Florida, United States.

The friendship link with Kimry in Russia was suspended due to the Russian invasion of Ukraine.

== Notable crime ==
On the 11th of May 2026, seven armed teenagers were arrested at Eastleigh railway station after an "aggravated burglary".

== See also ==
- Eastleigh constituency
