= Southampton Airport Parkway railway station =

Railway station in Hampshire, England

Southampton Airport Parkway
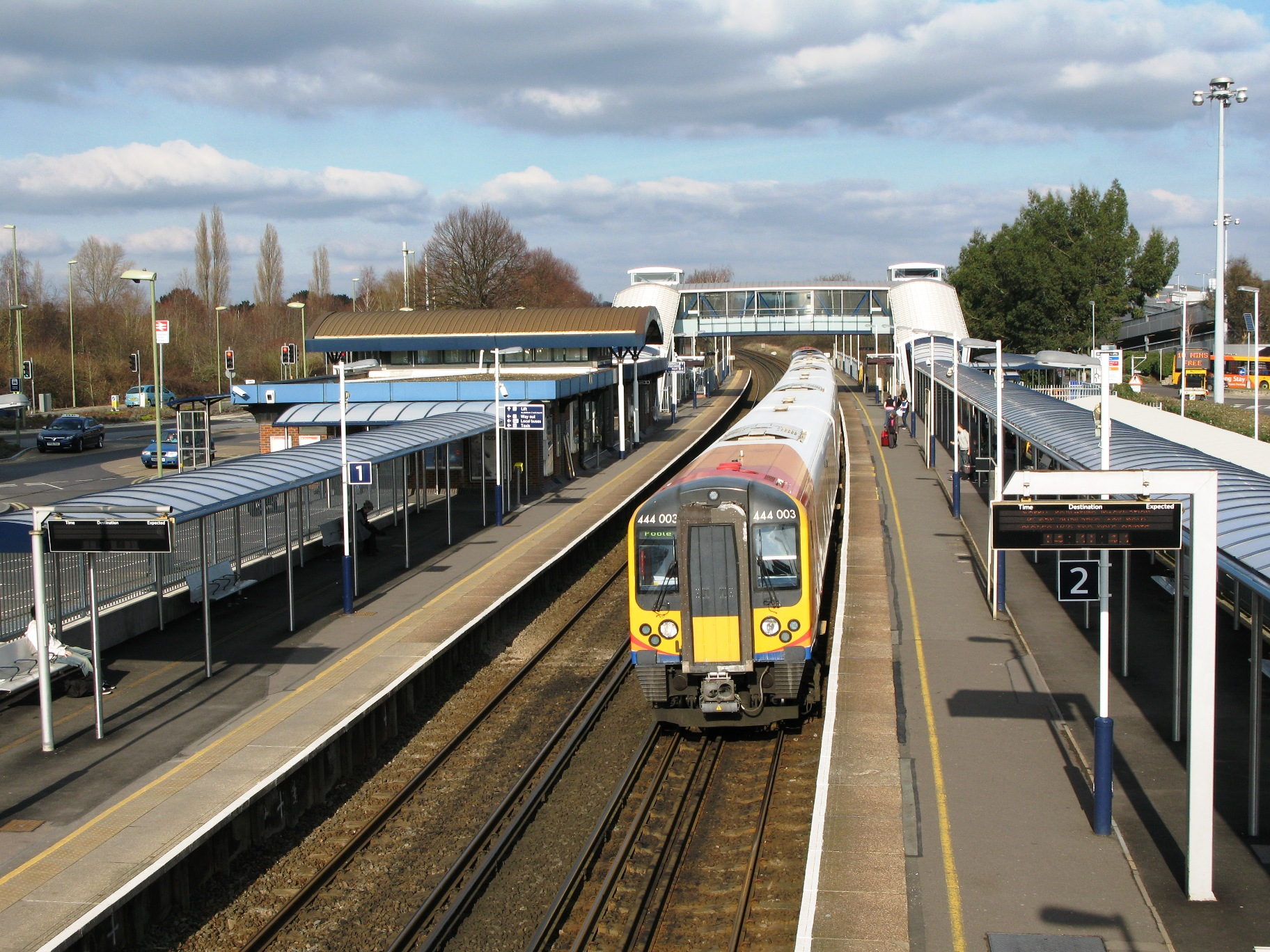
- The station, looking northwards in February 2012

General information
- Location: Eastleigh, Borough of Eastleigh, England
- Coordinates: 50°57′01″N 1°21′48″W
- Grid reference: SU448170
- Managed by: South Western Railway
- Platforms: 2

Other information
- Station code: SOA
- Classification: DfT category C1

Key dates
- 30 October 1929: Opened as Atlantic Park Hostel Halt
- 1950s: Closed
- 1 April 1966: Reopened as Southampton Airport
- 29 September 1986: Renamed Southampton Parkway for Southampton (Eastleigh) Airport
- 29 May 1994: Renamed Southampton Airport Parkway

Passengers
- 2020/21: ▼0.233 million
- Interchange: ▼29,456
- 2021/22: ▲0.780 million
- Interchange: ▲74,861
- 2022/23: ▲1.079 million
- Interchange: ▲95,308
- 2023/24: ▲1.217 million
- Interchange: ▲0.104 million
- 2024/25: ▲1.444 million
- Interchange: ▲0.122 million
Location
Notes
- Passenger statistics from the Office of Rail and Road

Southampton Airport Parkway is a railway station on the South West Main Line, located in the south of Eastleigh, in Hampshire, England. It is located 74 miles 66 chains (120.4 km) down the line from London Waterloo and is adjacent to Southampton Airport.

== History ==
The station opened with different structures as the Atlantic Park Hostel Halt in 1929, built by the Southern Railway and closed before the 1950s. In 1966, many of the present parts were built and services were resumed by British Rail as Southampton Airport (1966). The station was later renamed Southampton Parkway (1986) and Southampton Airport Parkway (1994).

== Facilities ==
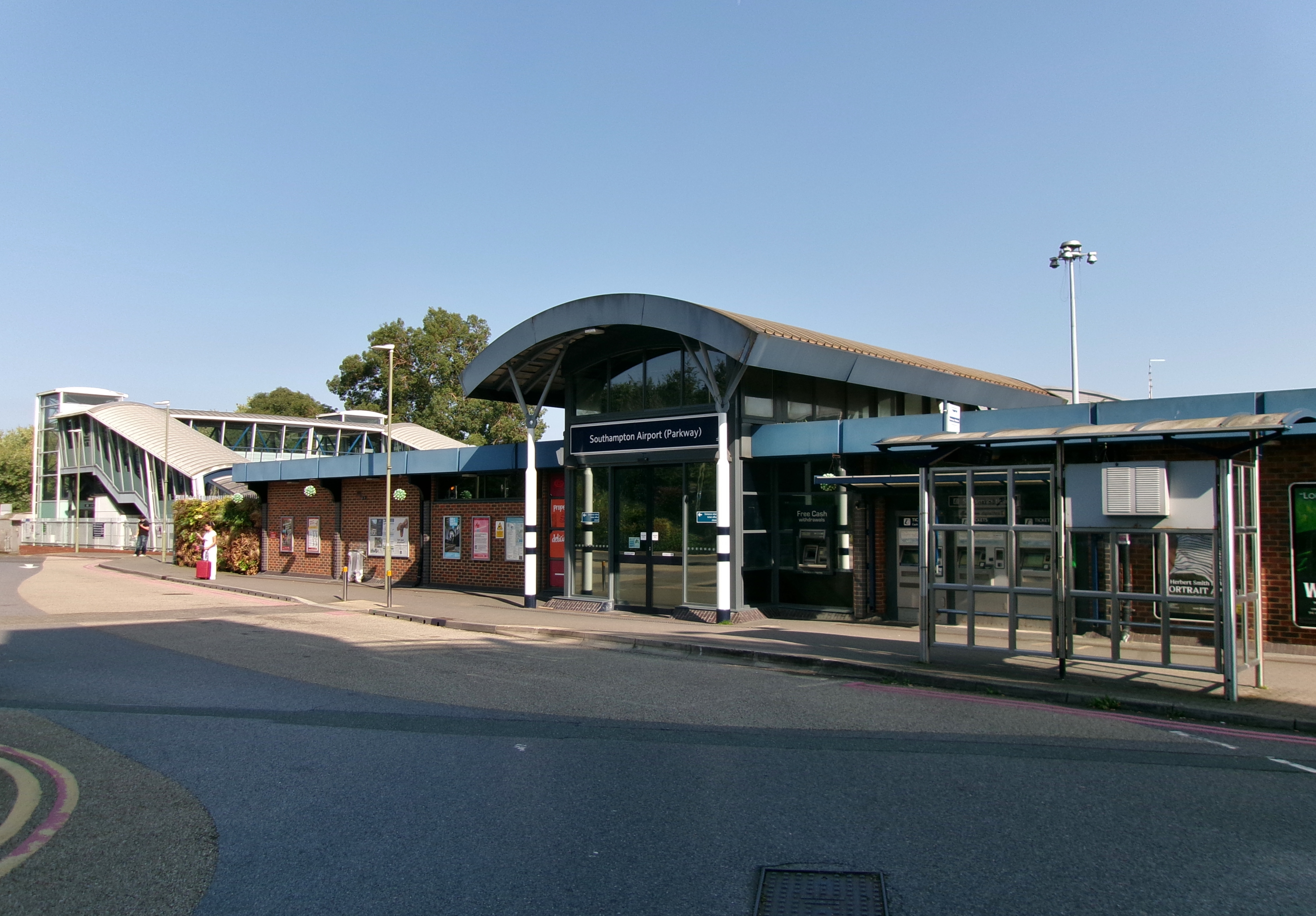
The station entrance in 2024

Designed as a park-and-ride or Parkway station, facilities available include a ticket office, toilets, coffee shop, waiting area and car parking.

The station was upgraded in 2010 with a new footbridge with lifts to improve accessibility for disabled people costing £2 million as part of a wider £7 million investment in the airport. Additionally, lobbying was done to keep the station as a stop on all major routes in the service pattern, which was successful.

The station has two platforms:

- Northbound towards London Waterloo, via Winchester, Basingstoke, Woking and Clapham Junction; services via Basingstoke to Reading, Birmingham New Street and the North West also leave from here.
- The southbound platform facilitates services towards Southampton Central, Bournemouth, Portsmouth Harbour and Weymouth.

== Services ==
The station is served by four train operating companies, with service patterns shown in trains per hour / day:

South Western Railway

- 2 tph to London Waterloo
- 1 tph to Winchester
- 1 tph to Southampton Central
- 2 tph to Weymouth, via Southampton Central
- 1 tph to Romsey, via Chandler's Ford
- 1 tph to Salisbury, via Southampton Central and Romsey.

CrossCountry

- 1 tph to Manchester Piccadilly, via Reading and Birmingham New Street
- 1 tph to Bournemouth
- 1 tpd to Newcastle.

Great Western Railway

- 1 tpd to Bristol Temple Meads, via Southampton Central and Salisbury
- 1 tpd to Portsmouth Harbour, via Eastleigh.

Southern

- 1 tpd to Brighton, via Eastleigh
- 1 tpd to Littlehampton, via Eastleigh
- 1 tpd to Southampton Central.

| Preceding station | National Rail | Following station |
|---|---|---|
| Winchester | CrossCountry; Bournemouth–Manchester | Southampton Central |
| Winchester | South Western Railway; London–Weymouth | Southampton Central |
| Eastleigh | Southern; Brighton–Southampton; Limited Service | Southampton Central |
| Eastleigh | Great Western Railway; Cardiff–Portsmouth via Southampton; Limited Service | Southampton Central |
| Eastleigh | South Western Railway; London–Poole | Southampton Central |
| Eastleigh | South Western Railway; London–Poole | Swaythling |
