= Redbridge railway station =

Railway station in Southampton, England

Coordinates: 50°55′11″N 1°28′13″W

Redbridge
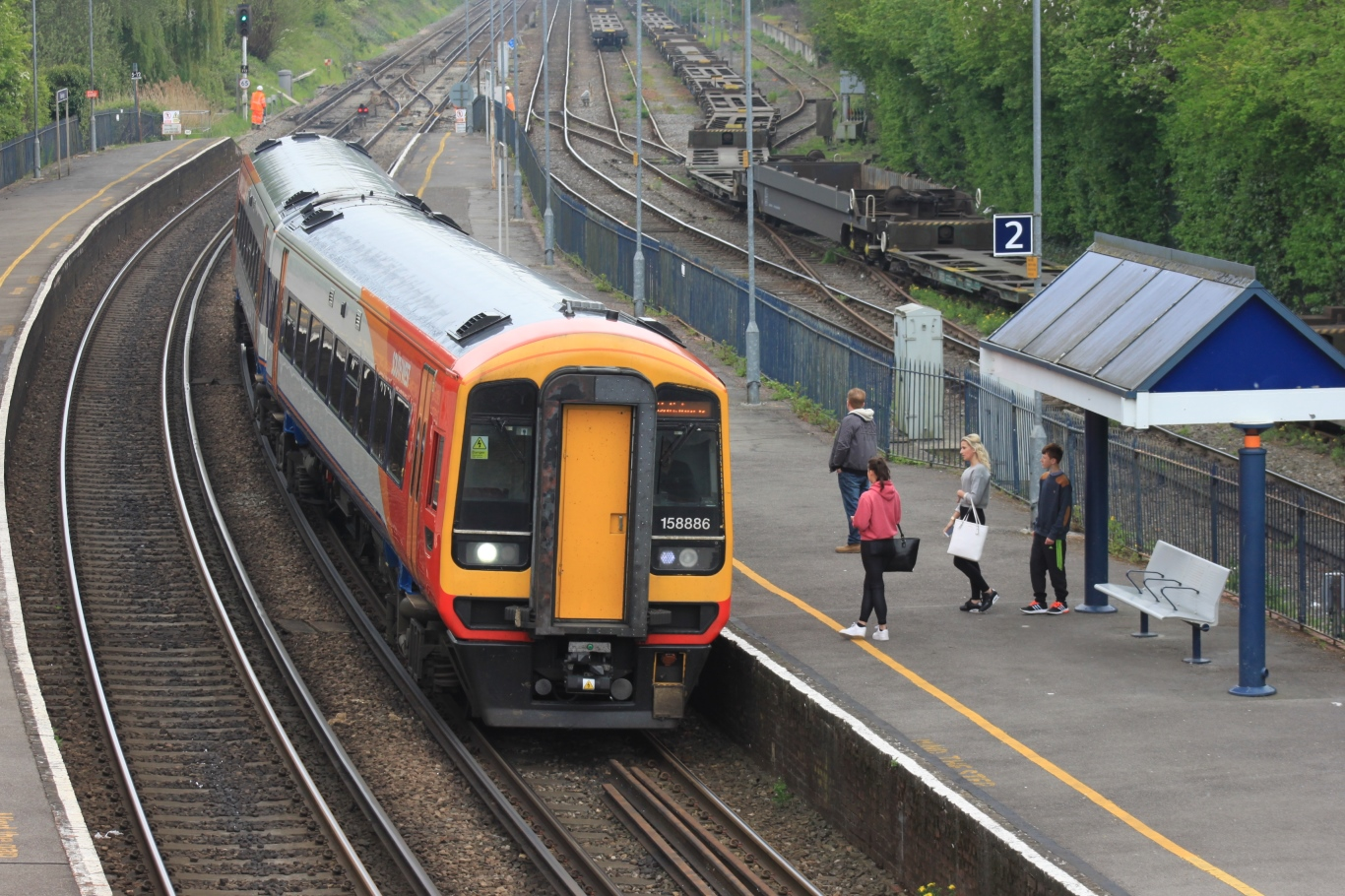

General information
- Location: Redbridge, City of Southampton; England
- Grid reference: SU373135
- Manager: South Western Railway
- Platforms: 2

Other information
- Station code: RDB
- Classification: DfT category F2

History
- Opened: 1 June 1847

Passengers
- 2021/22: ▲27,416
- Interchange: ▲867
- 2022/23: ▲28,894
- Interchange: ▲1,389
- 2023/24: ▲30,304
- Interchange: ▲1,822
- 2024/25: ▲33,394
- Interchange: ▲2,375
- 2025/26: ▲35,926
- Interchange: ▲2,760
Location
Notes
- Passenger statistics from the Office of Rail and Road

Redbridge railway station is a small station in the Redbridge area of Southampton, England. The station is located at the junction of the Wessex Main Line, towards Cardiff Central and the South West Main Line towards Weymouth, although most trains calling at Redbridge continue along the Wessex Main Line; trains on the South West Main Line usually pass through without stopping. It is 81 miles 70 chains (131.8 km) from London Waterloo.

The station is operated by South Western Railway and served mainly by the hourly Salisbury to Romsey via Southampton Central 'Figure of Six' local service. It was first opened in 1847 by the Southampton and Dorchester Railway and became a junction in 1865 when the Sprat and Winkle Line to Romsey and Andover was completed.

In the late 19th and early 20th centuries, Redbridge station was a key location in the movement of gunpowder manufactured in the New Forest.

== Services ==
The Typical off-peak service in trains per hour is:

- 1 tph to Salisbury via Romsey
- 1 tph to Romsey via Southampton Central and Chander's Ford

During peak hours, there are a small number of additional trains to London Waterloo, Bournemouth and Poole.

| Preceding station | National Rail | Following station |
|---|---|---|
| Romsey | South Western Railway; Wessex Main Line | Millbrook |
| Totton | South Western Railway; South West Main Line Limited service | Southampton Central |
| | Historical railways | |
| Nursling | London & South Western Railway; Andover and Redbridge railway | Millbrook |
