= Eastleigh–Romsey line =

Railway line in United Kingdom

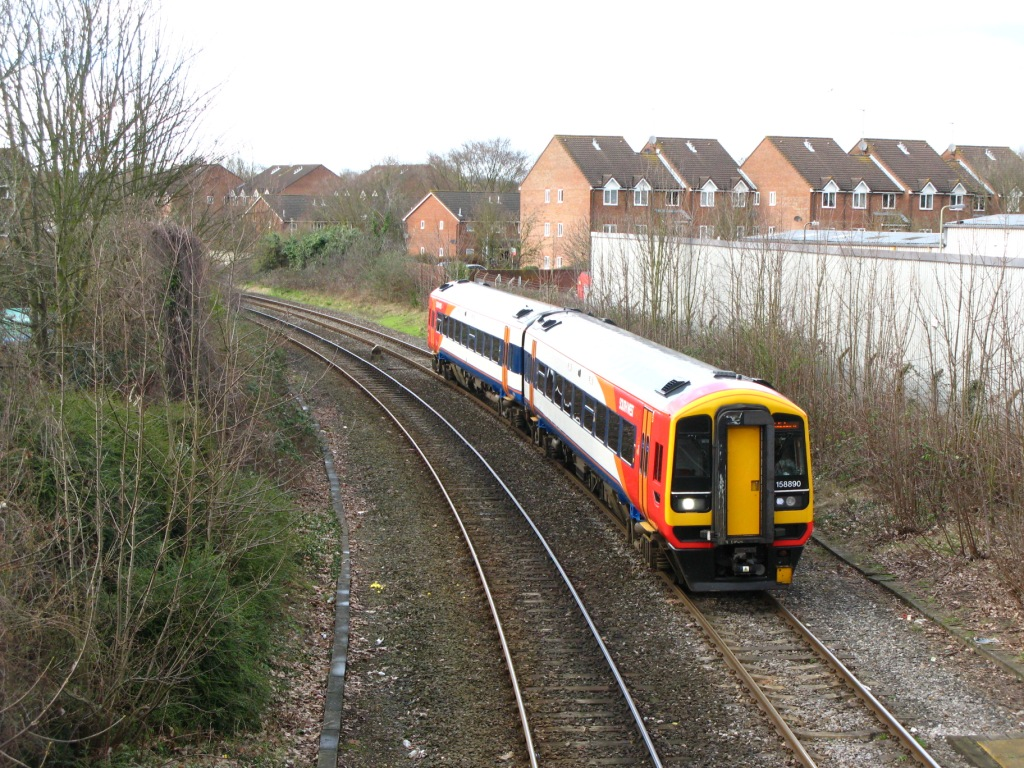
- A Class 158 approaching the junction at Eastleigh

Overview
- Status: Operational
- Owner: Network Rail
- Locale: Hampshire; South East England

Service
- Type: Suburban rail, Heavy rail
- System: National Rail
- Operator(s): South Western Railway (train operating company)
- Rolling stock: Class 158

History
- Opened: 1847

Technical
- Track gauge: 4 ft 8 1/2 in (1,435 mm) standard gauge
Route map
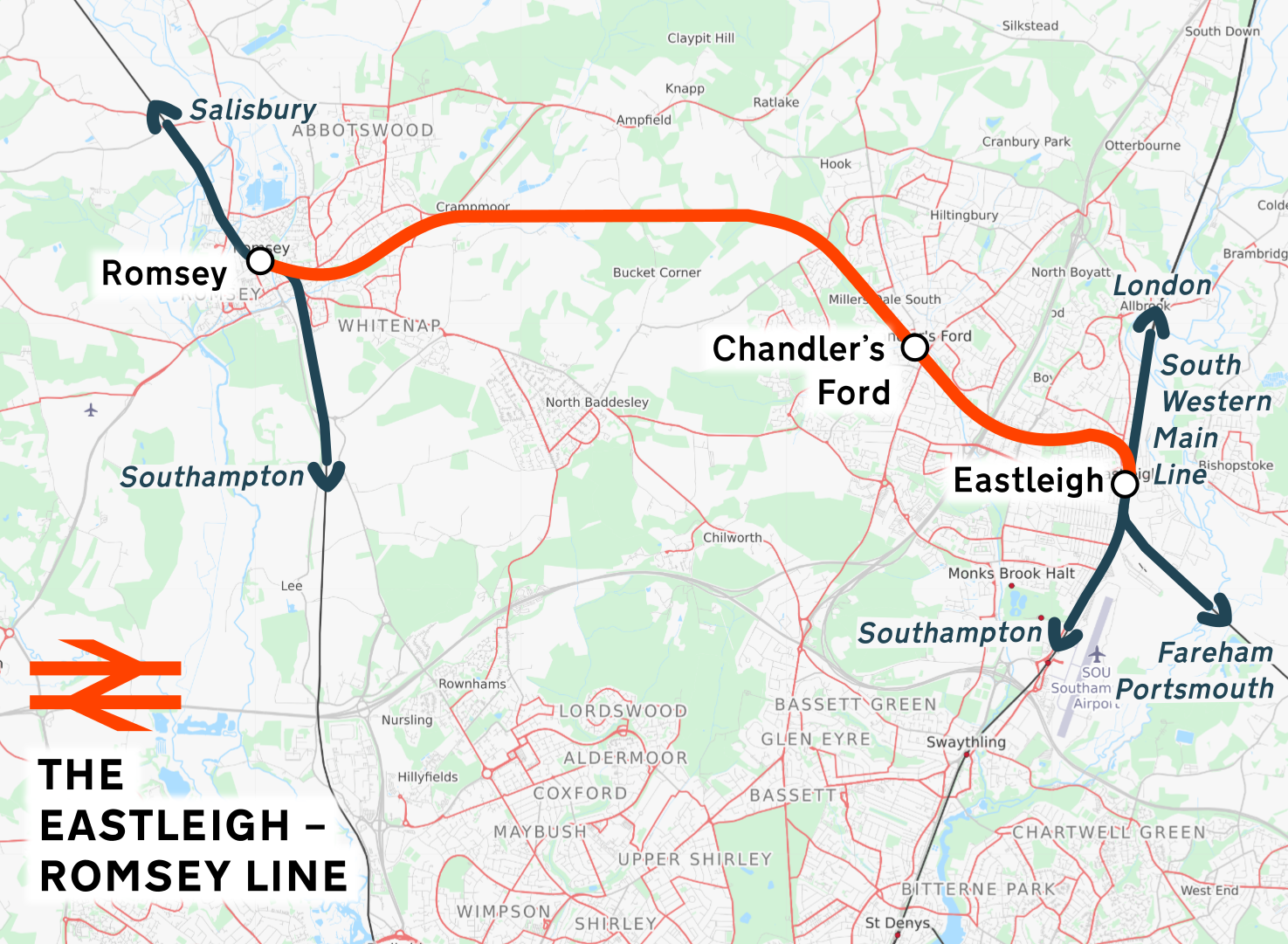
(Click to expand)

The Eastleigh–Romsey line is the railway line from Eastleigh to Romsey in Hampshire, England. At Eastleigh, trains join the South West Main Line for onward travel to Southampton. At Romsey most trains terminate. The line is not electrified and all trains are diesel-powered.

== History ==
Salisbury Branch Railway Act 1844
- Act of Parliament
- Parliament of the United Kingdom
- Long title: An Act to make a Branch Railway from the London and South-western Railway to Salisbury.
- Citation: 7 & 8 Vict. c. lxiii

Dates
- Royal assent: 4 July 1844

The line, part of the London and South Western Railway, was part of the Bishopstoke (now Eastleigh) to Salisbury line which was authorized by the Salisbury Branch Railway Act 1844 (7 & 8 Vict. c. lxiii) on 4 July 1844. Construction of the line was problematic, as landowners, somewhat unusually, took an obstructive attitude to the railway. The problems were exacerbated by the choice of a small contractor over the more well established and more experienced options in order to save money. In addition, the weather conditions during construction caused earthworks to slip and then freeze. As a result of all these factors, the opening of the line was postponed three times before coal and goods traffic used the line for the first time on 27 January 1847. The line was opened to passenger traffic on 1 March 1847 and was the main route from Salisbury to London from that time until the opening of the direct Salisbury line over a decade later, on 1 May 1857.

Chandler's Ford station was closed to goods traffic on 1 June 1964, and five years later on 5 May 1969, the station was also closed to passengers when regular passenger services were withdrawn. Originally built as a double track, the line was singled on 1 May 1972. The line continued to be used by stone trains from the Mendip area to and from Botley as well as other freight services, as well as weekend diversions of passenger traffic.

A £10 million plan was put forward in 1999 to reopen Southampton Terminus and Northam, which was to have been controlled by East Anglia Railways Train Company, their plans included building a new rail-link using the current remaining track by St. Marys Stadium and as far as the Waterfront, which is now safe guarded by Southampton City Council for future rail links. This would have allowed trains to go from Southampton Waterfront to East Anglia without the need to change at London. It was also hoped it would reduce the traffic around Southampton with a local commuter line linking the Waterfront to Romsey, Halterworth and Chandler's Ford, but the plan failed to come about for reasons unknown.

The line between Eastleigh and Romsey was reopened for passenger traffic in May 2003 with a re-built station at Chandler's Ford.

== Services ==
Services and stations on this line are operated by South Western Railway. It has an hourly service in each direction which runs a 'figure of six' route from Romsey to Salisbury, running from Romsey via Eastleigh and Southampton before re-visiting Romsey and continuing to Salisbury. The service is currently operated by Class 158 DMUs.

== Route ==
For much of the route, the line runs close to the Monks Brook; north-east of Chandler's Ford, it crosses the edge of the Trodds Copse Site of Special Scientific Interest.

== See also ==
Eastleigh to Salisbury line
