= Nursling railway station =

Former railway station in England

Nursling
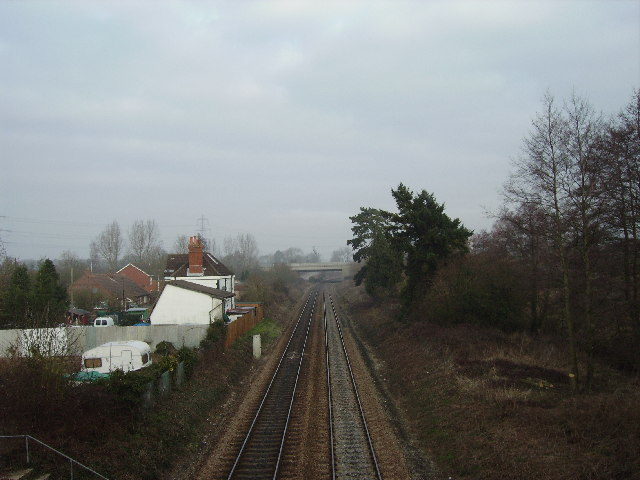
- Former site looking north

General information
- Location: Nursling, Test Valley; England
- Coordinates: 50.9428°N 1.4840°W
- Grid reference: SU363160
- Platforms: 2

Other information
- Status: Disused

History
- Original company: London and South Western Railway
- Pre-grouping: London and South Western Railway
- Post-grouping: Southern Railway

Key dates
- 19 November 1882: Opened
- 16 September 1957: Closed
Location

Nursling railway station served the village of Nursling near Southampton, England.

== History ==
The Andover and Redbridge Railway was authorised in 1858 and opened in 1865, by which time it had been absorbed by the London and South Western Railway (LSWR), this occurring in 1863. The station at Nursling was opened by the LSWR on 19 November 1882. Becoming part of the Southern Railway during the Grouping of 1923, the station passed to the Southern Region of British Railways on nationalisation in 1948. It was closed by the British Transport Commission on 16 September 1957.

== The site today ==
The station house is in use as a private residence, although the platforms have been demolished. Trains still pass the site on the Wessex Main Line.

Preceding station	Disused railways	Following station
Redbridge	London & South Western Railway; Andover and Redbridge railway	Romsey

== Sources ==
- Butt, R. V. J. (October 1995). The Directory of Railway Stations: details every public and private passenger station, halt, platform and stopping place, past and present (1st ed.). Sparkford: Patrick Stephens Ltd. ISBN 978-1-85260-508-7. OCLC 60251199. OL 11956311M.
- Jowett, Alan (2000). Jowett's Nationalised Railway Atlas (1st ed.). Penryn, Cornwall: Atlantic Transport Publishers. ISBN 978-0-906899-99-1. OCLC 228266687.
- Williams, R.A. (1968). The London & South Western Railway, volume 1: The Formative Years. Newton Abbot: David & Charles. ISBN 0-7153-4188-X.
- Bray, Nigel (2004). Andover to Redbridge: The Sprat and Winkle Line. KRB Publications.
