= Eastleigh railway station =

Railway station in Hampshire, England

Coordinates: 50°58′10″N 1°20′58″W

Eastleigh
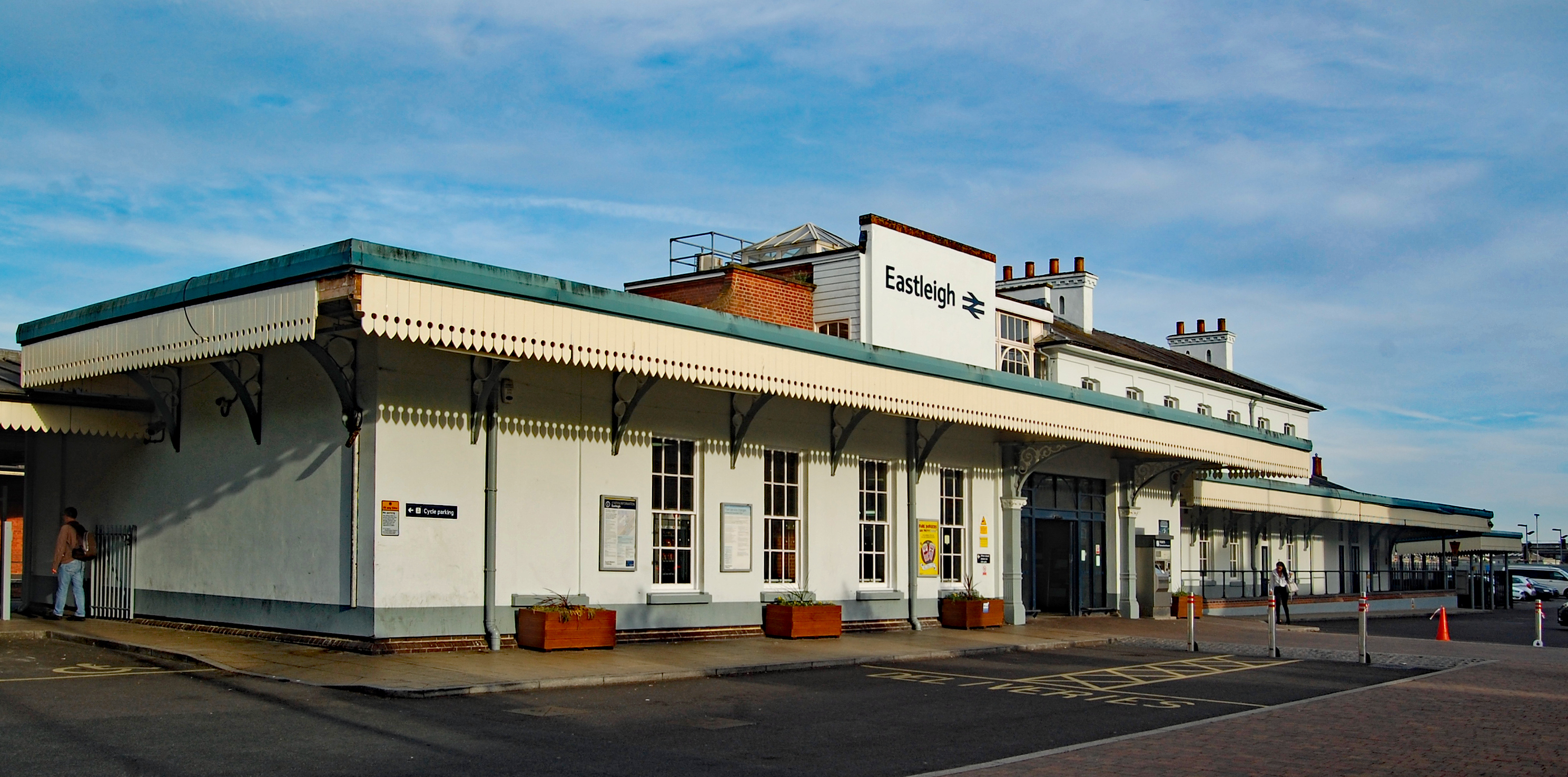
- Exterior of the station, June 2019

General information
- Location: Eastleigh, Borough of Eastleigh, England
- Grid reference: SU457190
- Managed by: South Western Railway
- Platforms: 3
- Tracks: 5

Other information
- Station code: ESL
- Classification: DfT category C1

History
- Opened: 10 June 1839
- Original company: London and South Western Railway
- Pre-grouping: London and South Western Railway
- Post-grouping: Southern Railway

Passengers
- 2020/21: ▼0.375 million
- Interchange: ▼30,338
- 2021/22: ▲0.908 million
- Interchange: ▲85,078
- 2022/23: ▲1.090 million
- Interchange: ▲93,127
- 2023/24: ▲1.147 million
- Interchange: ▲95,269
- 2024/25: ▲1.192 million
- Interchange: ▲0.107 million

Listed Building – Grade II
- Official name: Eastleigh
- Designated: 14 February 1983
- Reference no.: 1281411
Location
Notes
- Passenger statistics from the Office of Rail and Road

Eastleigh railway station serves the town of Eastleigh, in Hampshire, England. It is a stop on the South West Main Line and is the junction station for two other routes: the Eastleigh-Fareham Line and the Eastleigh-Romsey Line. It lies 73 miles 35 chains (118.2 km) from London Waterloo. South of the station are Eastleigh Railway Works and Eastleigh Depot.

== History ==
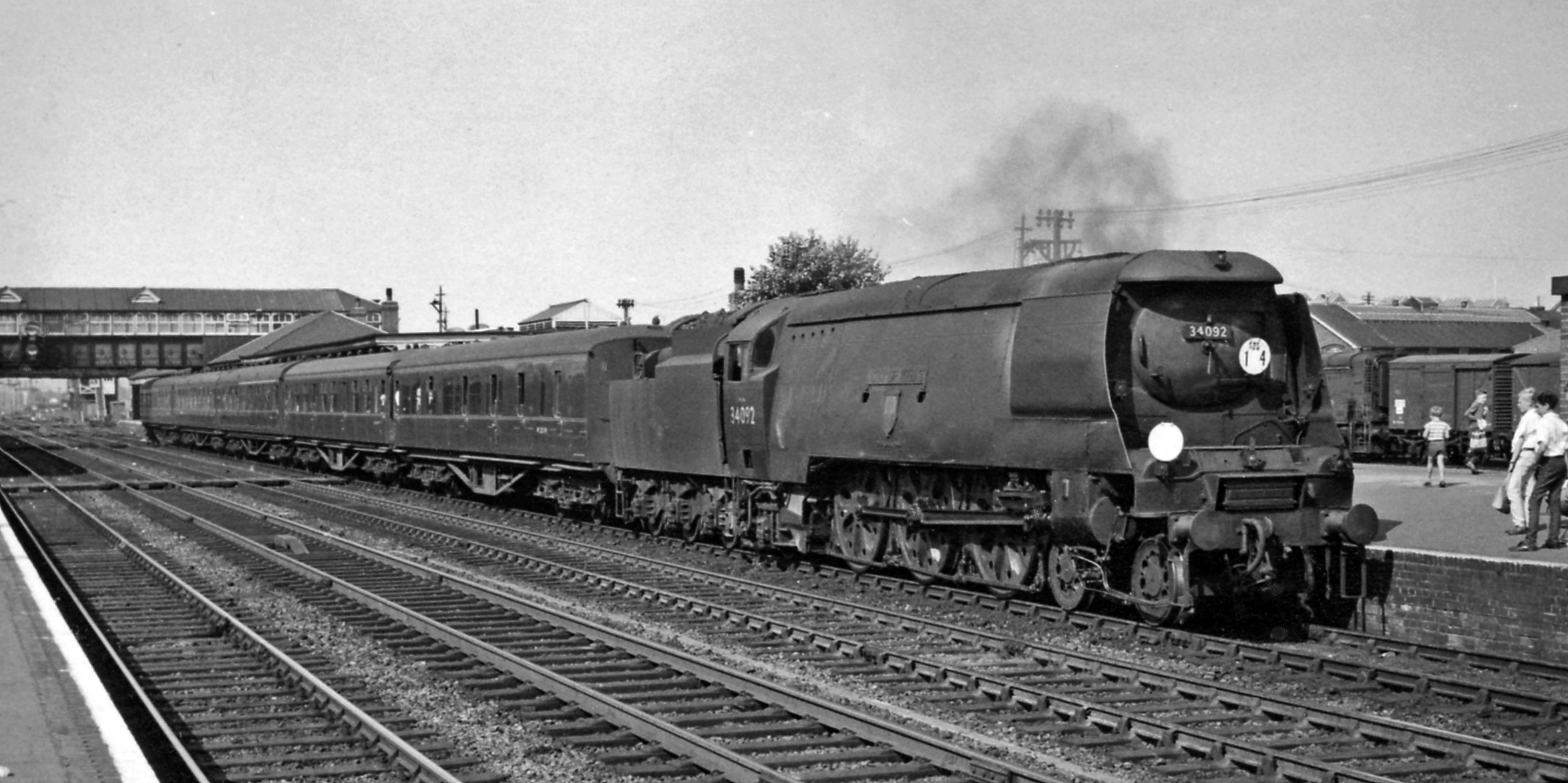
A special for Salisbury via Southampton in August 1964

The station was built by the LSWR and was called Bishopstoke when it was opened in 1839. The station house was designed by Sir William Tite and has been Grade II listed since 1983. It was renamed Bishopstoke Junction in 1852 (the branch to Fareham and Gosport having opened in 1841), Eastleigh and Bishopstoke in 1889, and finally Eastleigh in 1923.

The station has been a busy and important junction throughout its life, having gained a second branch line to Salisbury via Romsey in 1847 and a large carriage & wagon repair shops (later to become Eastleigh Works) in 1891. The main Waterloo to Bournemouth line was electrified in 1967, but the Romsey line closed to passenger traffic two years later in May 1969. The Portsmouth line remained diesel worked until 1990, but was then added to the electrified network. Passenger services over the line to Romsey restarted in 2003.

In 2015, the forecourt of the station received major improvements at a cost of £500,000

=== Accidents and incidents ===
On 28 January 2020, the locomotive hauling a freight train derailed whilst moving at a slow speed just outside the station. It caused major structural damage to the tracks and disruption for several days across the whole South West Main Line between Southampton Central and Basingstoke; delays lasted well into February. The derailment was caused by a defect which allowed the track to move apart underneath the locomotive. Four wagons in the train also derailed.

== Services ==
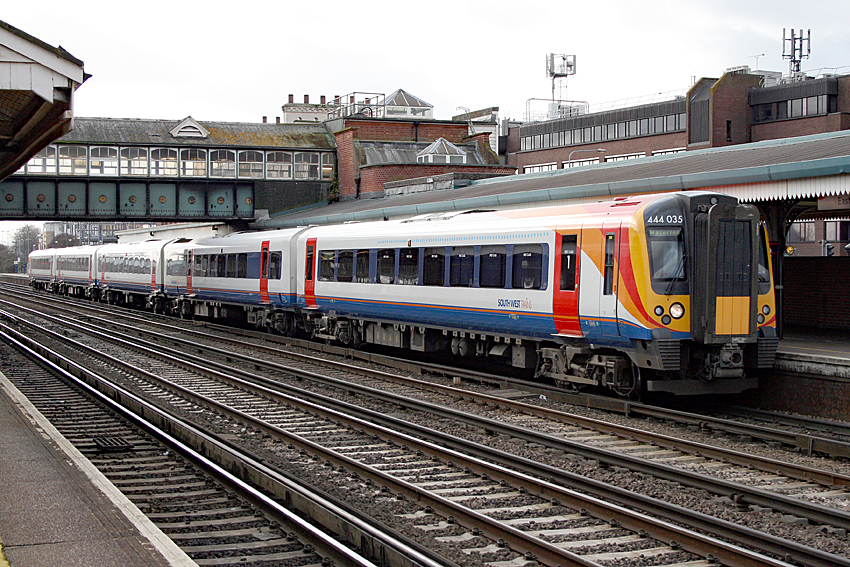
A Class 444 electric multiple unit at Eastleigh on an up service

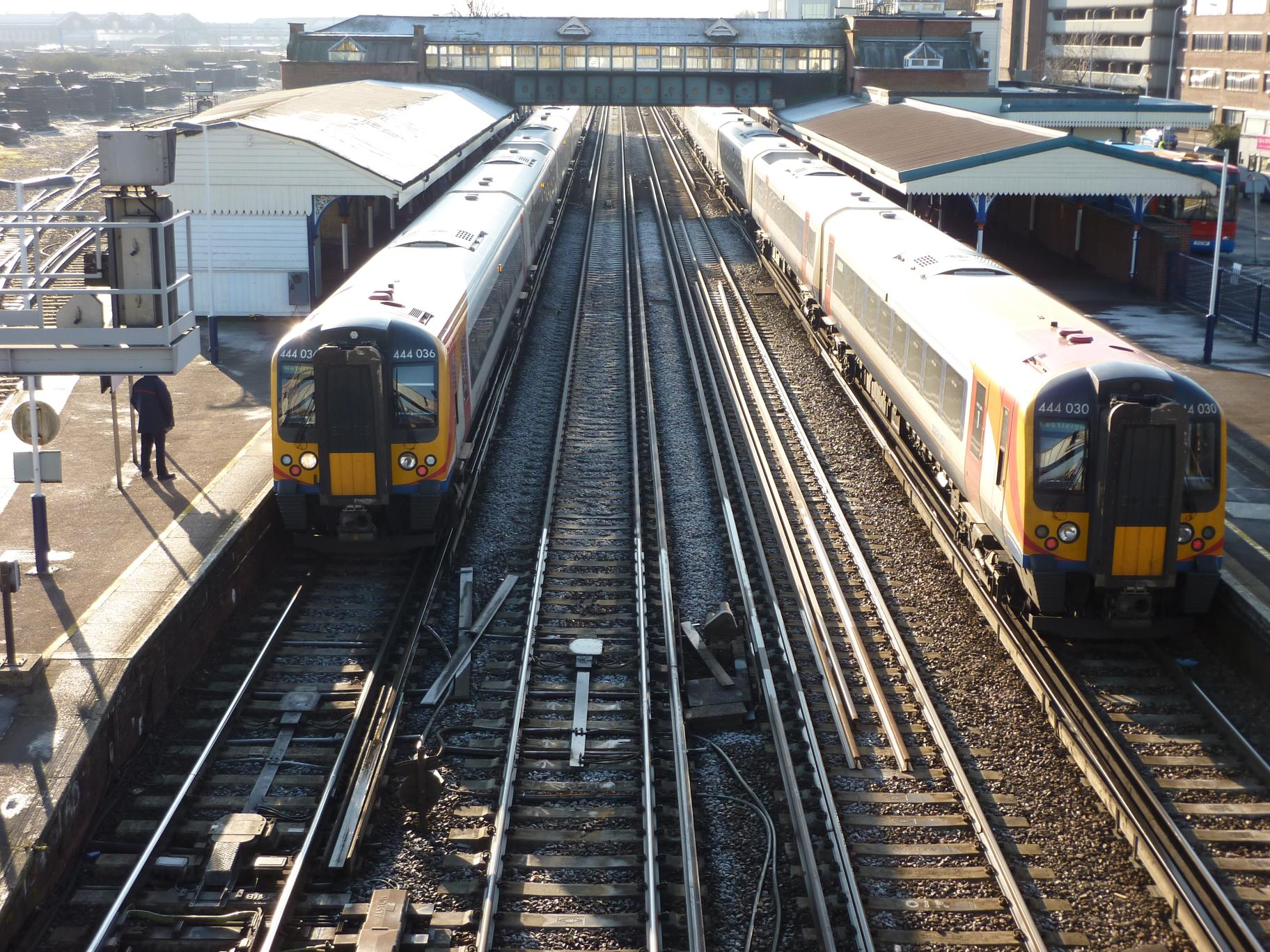
Two Class 444s at Eastleigh, January 2010

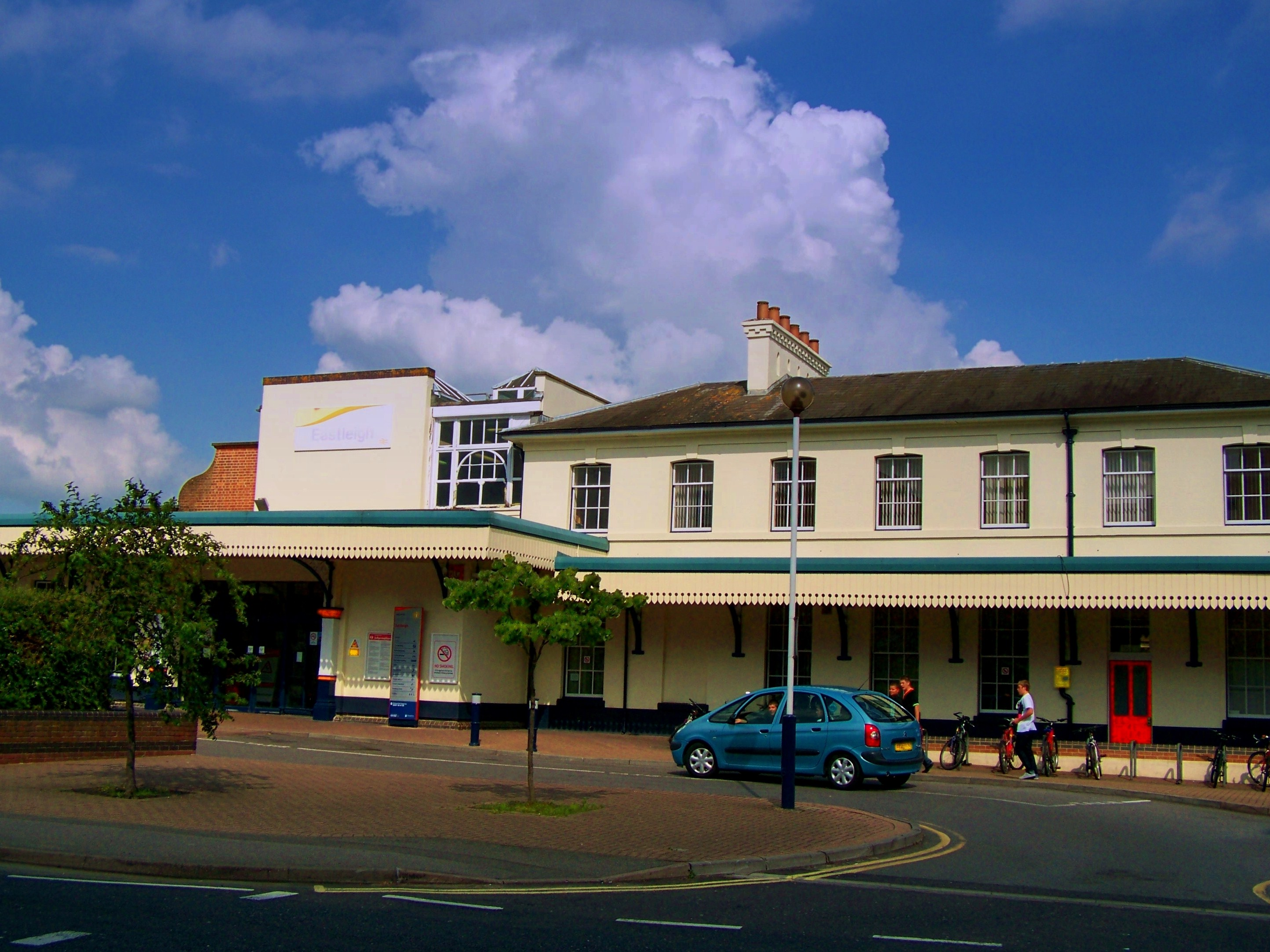
Eastleigh station's exterior in June 2009

Services are operated by three train operating companies:

- South Western Railway is the main train operating company at Eastleigh, and runs services on three different lines: to Portsmouth Harbour via Hedge End, the South West Main Line to London Waterloo, Southampton Central and Bournemouth and the Salisbury to Romsey Figure 6 stopping line. Additional services to Basingstoke and Weymouth operate during peak times.
- Southern operates one daily service to Southampton Central (via Southampton Airport Parkway) and Brighton (via Hedge End/Fareham) only on weekday afternoons.
- Great Western Railway operates one train to Portsmouth Harbour in the evening Sundays to Fridays, one train to Bristol in the late evening on Mondays to Fridays and one train to Westbury in the late evening on Saturdays.

The general off-peak service in trains per hour is:

Up:

- 1 tph to London Waterloo
- 1 tph to Winchester/Basingstoke
- 1 tph to Romsey via Chandler's Ford

Down:

- 1 tph to Portsmouth Harbour
- 1 tph to Southampton Central/Bournemouth
- 1 tph to Salisbury via Southampton Central

The general Sunday service is similar, but with just one train to Waterloo per hour; the Poole and Portsmouth Harbour services join/split at Eastleigh, then run to/from London Waterloo as a joint service until 4pm when the services are separated, with the Portsmouth Harbour service as a stopping service to London Waterloo.

| Preceding station | National Rail | Following station |
|---|---|---|
| Winchester | South Western Railway; London–Portsmouth Harbour | Hedge End |
| Winchester | South Western Railway; London–Poole | Southampton Airport Parkway |
| Shawford | South Western Railway; London–Poole | Southampton Airport Parkway |
| Chandler's Ford | South Western Railway; Romsey to Salisbury local services | Southampton Airport Parkway |
| Fareham | Southern; Brighton–Southampton; Limited Service | Southampton Airport Parkway |
| Fareham | Great Western Railway; Cardiff–Portsmouth via Southampton; Limited Service | Southampton Airport Parkway |
| Hedge End | Great Western Railway; Cardiff–Portsmouth via Southampton; Limited Service | Southampton Airport Parkway |

== Connections ==
Eastleigh station is also served by a number of bus routes; they are as follows:

- Bluestar 2 to Southampton and Fair Oak, via Portswood and Bishopstoke
- Bluestar 5 to Romsey and Boyatt Wood, via North Baddesley and Chandler's Ford
- Bluestar 24 to Eastleigh bus station and Hedge End, via Southampton Airport and West End, Hampshire
- Bluestar C7 to Marwell Zoo
- UniLink U1C to National Oceanography Centre, Southampton, via University of Southampton and Southampton Central station
