= Southampton Central railway station =

Railway station in Hampshire, England

Southampton Central
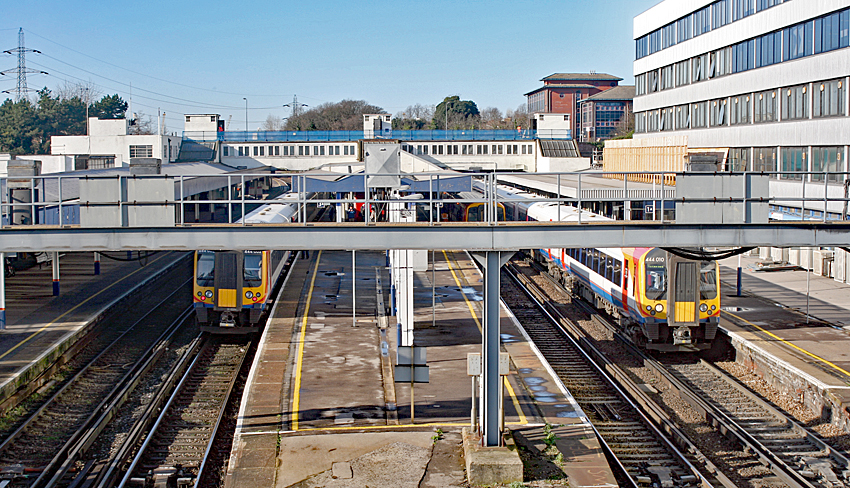

General information
- Location: Southampton, City of Southampton, England
- Coordinates: 50°54′27″N 1°24′51″W
- Grid reference: SU41191223
- Manager: South Western Railway
- Platforms: 5 (4 in passenger use)

Other information
- Station code: SOU
- Classification: DfT category B

History
- Original company: London and South Western Railway
- Pre-grouping: London and South Western Railway
- Post-grouping: Southern Railway

Key dates
- 1 November 1895: Opened as Southampton West
- 1934–1935: Enlarged
- 7 July 1935: Renamed Southampton Central
- 10 July 1967: Renamed Southampton
- 29 May 1994: Renamed Southampton Central

Passengers
- 2020/21: ▼1.448 million
- Interchange: ▼0.273 million
- 2021/22: ▲4.294 million
- Interchange: ▲0.875 million
- 2022/23: ▲5.496 million
- Interchange: ▲1.208 million
- 2023/24: ▲5.795 million
- Interchange: ▼0.842 million
- 2024/25: ▲6.173 million
- Interchange: ▲0.975 million
Location
Notes
- Passenger statistics from the Office of Rail and Road

Southampton Central (originally Southampton West and later known simply as Southampton) is a main line railway station serving the city of Southampton, in Hampshire, England. It lies on the South West Main Line, the Wessex Main Line and the West Coastway Line. It is approached from the London direction by passing through Southampton Tunnel and is 79 miles 19 chains (79.2 mi; 127.5 km) down the line from London Waterloo. (Note: Railways in Great Britain are measured historically in miles and chains; there are 80 chains to one mile.) The station is managed by South Western Railway, which also operates the majority of services; other operators are CrossCountry, Great Western Railway and Southern. It is the busiest station in Hampshire.

== History ==
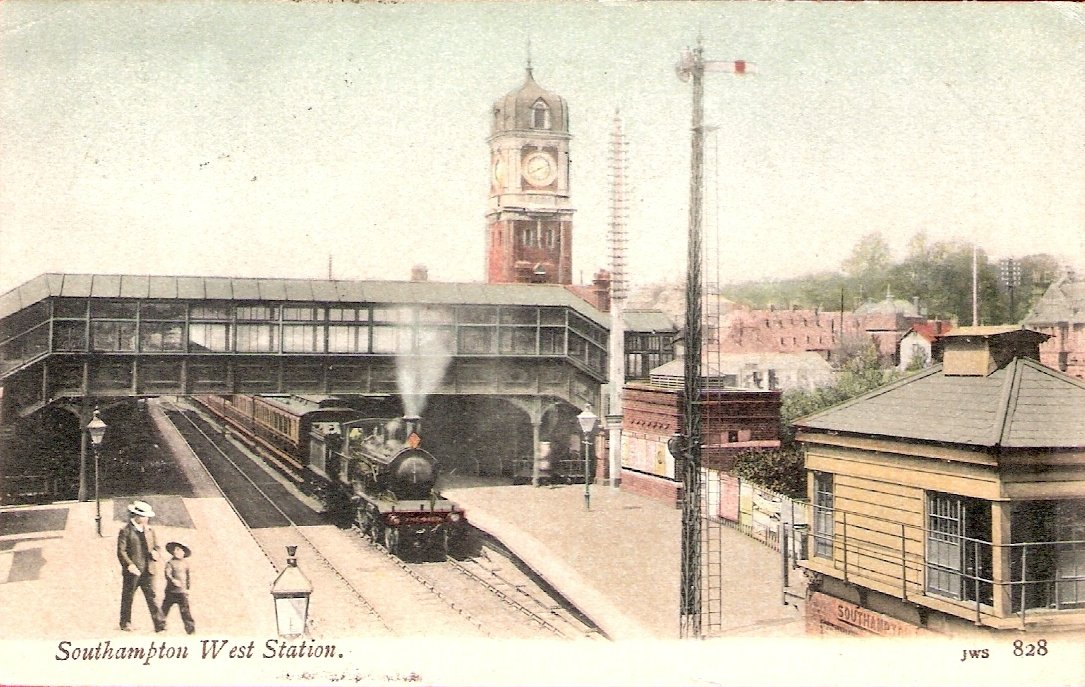
Southampton West station, c.1908

The station was opened as Southampton West in 1895, to replace the smaller nearby West End station; this was originally named Blechynden when it opened in 1847. The new station buildings were largely constructed from concrete in an art deco style. The station was on the seafront, specifically the stretch of water known as West Bay, with the water reaching right up to the southern edge of the platforms at high tide.

A series of land reclamation projects to expand the docks, largely funded by the London and South Western Railway, culminated in the building of the vast New Docks (now Western Docks) between 1927 and 1934, which led to all of West Bay being reclaimed and the station becoming landlocked. The new land and the demand for new lines allowed the station to be enlarged and redeveloped in 1934–35 (from two platforms to four) and it became Southampton Central. The new station buildings were largely constructed from concrete in an art deco style.

An air raid on 23 November 1940 damaged the buildings alongside platform one. The station was hit by two German parachute mines on 22 July 1941, which destroyed the ticket office on platform four and damaged the island platform.

In 1966, in preparation for the closure of Terminus station, near to the docks, alterations were made to the station's parcel handling facilities to allow it to manage increased volumes. In 1967, soon after the closure of Terminus station, Central station was rebuilt, losing its clock tower which was replaced with an office block; at this point, it was renamed Southampton although it was again renamed Southampton Central in 1994.

A partnership between Network Rail, South West Trains and Southampton City Council saw a £3 million investment in the refurbishment of the station entrances and improved passenger facilities which was completed in 2012.

=== Former services ===
In December 2007, a number of changes were made to South West Trains, First Great Western and Southern services. The Waterloo to Southampton Central stopping service was extended to Poole, replacing in part the former Brockenhurst to Wareham stopping service. The former Poole train was extended to Weymouth.

The Totton to Romsey shuttle and the Salisbury to Southampton Central portion of the First Great Western Westbury to Southampton Central service were replaced by a South West Trains Salisbury to Romsey via Southampton Central and Chandlers Ford service, which calls at Romsey twice on its journey.

Southern introduced a new service to Brighton, and the service to London Victoria then operated via Horsham, rather than Hove. This service was later withdrawn by Southern in 2024, although a single northbound service in the morning peak was retained.

In December 2008, CrossCountry launched its new timetable with most trains operating between Bournemouth and Manchester Piccadilly, with one service originating at Nottingham and one service on Saturdays terminating at Newcastle. During a short period in the summer, there was also a single service on Saturdays to Leeds. There were also around six trains per day in each direction on the Reading to Newcastle route, via Doncaster, which occasionally extended to Southampton Central, but no longer operates.

== Layout ==
All of the platforms are split into two sections: A at the east and B at the west; this allows two services to occupy a platform at the same time or for trains dividing into two portions or attaching to make one train. This dual use occurs throughout the day on platforms 2 and 3, and in peak hours on platforms 1 and 4. Current platform usage is:

- Platforms 1 and 4 lie to either side facing the fast lines, which accommodate CrossCountry's service between Manchester Piccadilly and Bournemouth; Great Western Railway's service between Cardiff Central and Portsmouth Harbour; and fast services between London Waterloo and Weymouth operated by South Western Railway.
- Platforms 2 and 3 are on an island, facing the slow lines. Services typically serving these platforms include South Western Railway's local services between Romsey and Salisbury, and to Portsmouth & Southsea. Southern services to Brighton also serve these platforms.
- There is also the former Red Star Parcels bay at the Bournemouth end of platform 4; previously numbered as platform 5, stopping services between here and Brockenhurst used this platform, but the platform can no longer be used for passenger services due to the lack of a proper starting signal. It is now used for the stabling of spare units. Up and down goods loops are located a short distance to the west of the station. These allow terminating trains to clear the platforms for through services if required, and also to allow passenger services to pass freight or empty coaching stock trains.

== Services ==
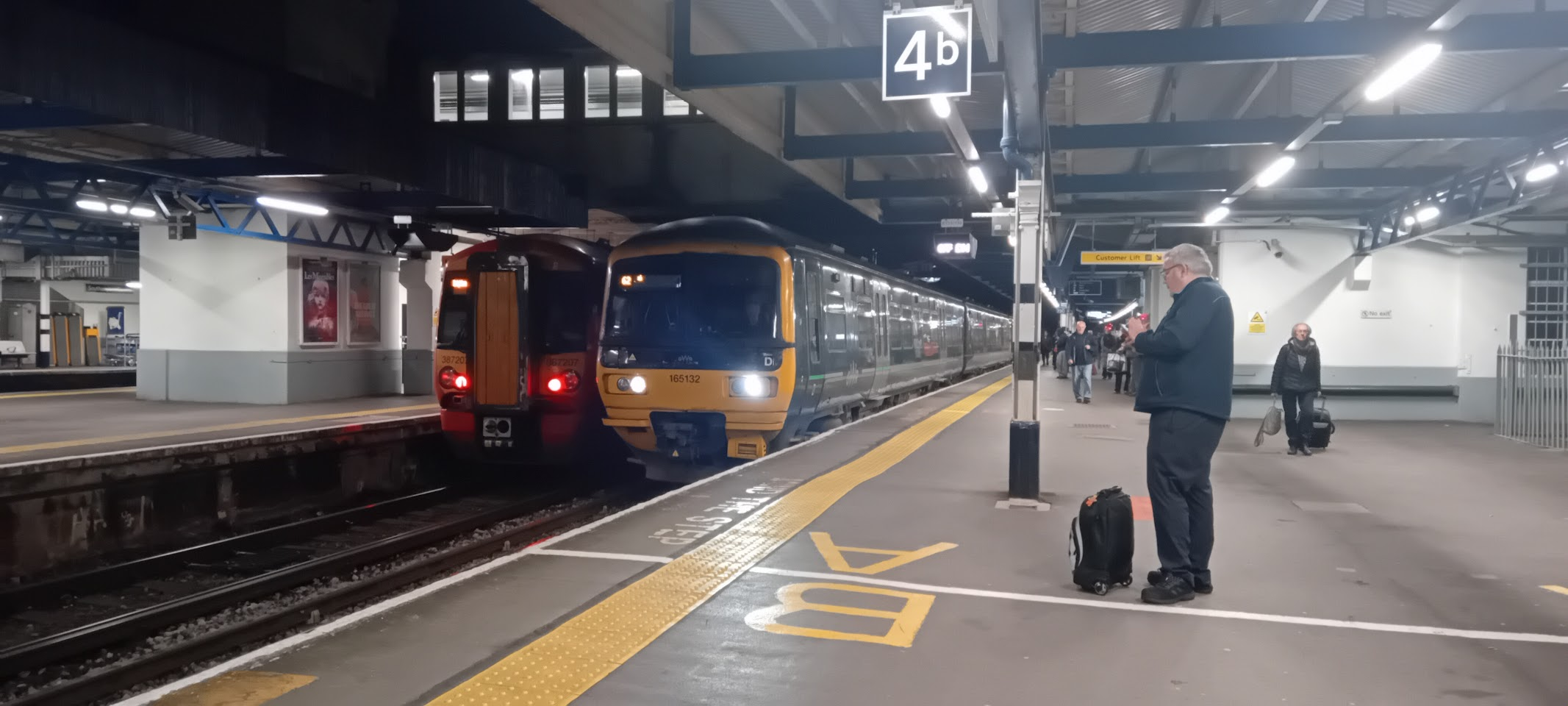
A Gatwick Express Class 387 operating a Southern service to Brighton and a Great Western Railway Class 165 operating a service to Cardiff Central

Southampton Central is served by four train operating companies, with the following typical off-peak service patterns in trains per hour (tph):

South Western Railway

- 2 tph to London Waterloo (fast), taking approximately 80 minutes
- 1 tph to Weymouth
- 1 tph to Weymouth and Poole, dividing at Bournemouth
- 1 tph to Winchester (stopping)
- 1 tph to Bournemouth (stopping)
- 1 tph to Portsmouth and Southsea (stopping)
- 1 tph to Romsey, via Eastleigh
- 1 tph to Salisbury via Redbridge and Romsey.

Southern

- 2 tph to Brighton, via Worthing.

Great Western Railway

- 1 tph to Cardiff Central, via Bristol Temple Meads
- 1 tph to Portsmouth Harbour.

CrossCountry

- 1 tph to Bournemouth
- 1 tph to Manchester Piccadilly
- 1 tpd to Newcastle.

Romsey can be reached by trains departing in both directions: by South Western Railway via Chandler's Ford in the up direction, and by South Western Railway and Great Western Railway via Redbridge on the down.

Preceding station	National Rail	Following station
Fareham	Great Western Railway; Wessex Main Line	Romsey
Southampton Airport Parkway Limited service	Great Western Railway; Wessex Main Line	Romsey
Southampton Airport Parkway	CrossCountry; Bournemouth-Manchester	Brockenhurst or Bournemouth
Southampton Airport Parkway	South Western Railway; South West Main Line	Totton or Brockenhurst
St Denys	South Western Railway; South West Main Line	Millbrook (Hampshire)
St Denys	South Western Railway; West Coastway Line	Terminus
Woolston	Southern; West Coastway line	Terminus
Southampton Airport Parkway Limited service	Southern; West Coastway line	Terminus

== Onward connections ==
Bus routes connect the station to:

- Southampton city centre
- Isle of Wight Red Funnel and Blue Funnel ferries
- National Oceanography Centre
- Southampton Airport
- University of Southampton's Highfield Campus.
