= Chandler's Ford railway station =

Railway station in Hampshire, England

Chandler's Ford
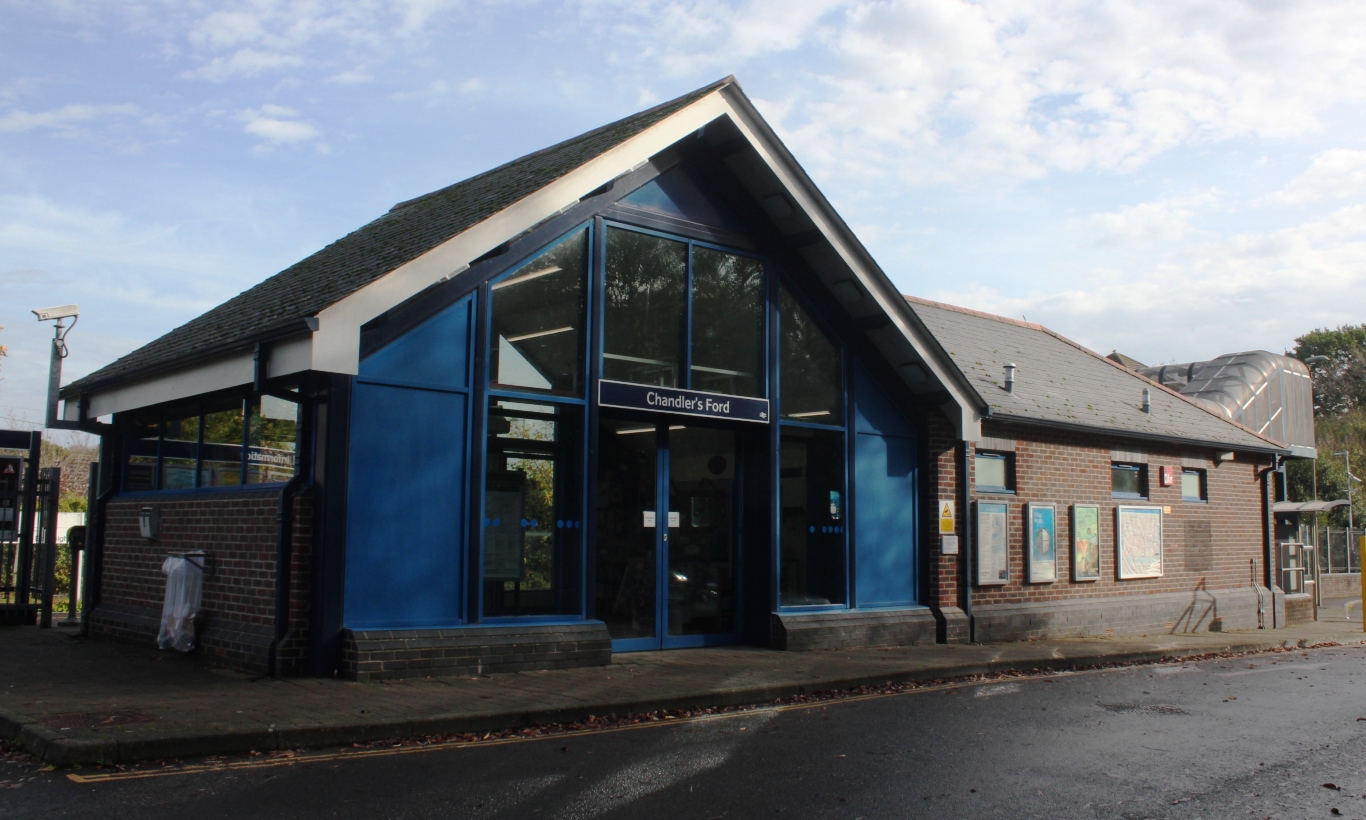
- Chandler's Ford station building

General information
- Location: Chandler's Ford, Eastleigh; England
- Coordinates: 50°58′59″N 1°23′04″W
- Grid reference: SU432206
- Manager: South Western Railway
- Platforms: 1

Other information
- Station code: CFR
- Classification: DfT category E

Key dates
- 1 March 1847: Opened
- 5 May 1969: Closed
- 18 May 2003: Reopened

Passengers
- 2020/21: ▼38,800
- 2021/22: ▲94,656
- 2022/23: ▲0.129 million
- 2023/24: ▲0.146 million
- 2024/25: ▲0.158 million
Location
Notes
- Passenger statistics from the Office of Rail and Road

Chandler's Ford railway station serves the Chandler's Ford area of Eastleigh in Hampshire, England. It is on the Eastleigh to Romsey Line, 75 miles 25 chains (121.2 km) measured from London Waterloo.

== History ==
The station was opened as a halt by the London and South Western Railway in 1847. The station was also used for transport of bricks manufactured nearby, for which a siding was provided. Passenger services were withdrawn by British Rail in May 1969, although occasional diverted trains and railtours continued to use the line, passing through the station without calling.

Chandler's Ford was reopened for passenger traffic on 18 May 2003, though the new station building was not completed until later that year. It was officially opened on 18 October 2003 by the television gardening presenter Charlie Dimmock, who originates from the area. The original station had two platforms, but the new station has only one, as the line is now single-track only.

== Services ==
Since reopening in 2003, the typical off-peak service is one train per hour to Romsey, and one train per hour to Salisbury via Southampton Central, operated by South Western Railway.

== Connections ==
Chandler's Ford station is also served by buses on the Bluestar 1 between Southampton and Winchester via Bassett and Compton.

Preceding station	National Rail	Following station
Eastleigh	South Western Railway; Eastleigh to Romsey Line	Romsey
