= Romsey railway station =

Railway station in Hampshire, England

Coordinates: 50°59′34″N 1°29′36″W

Romsey
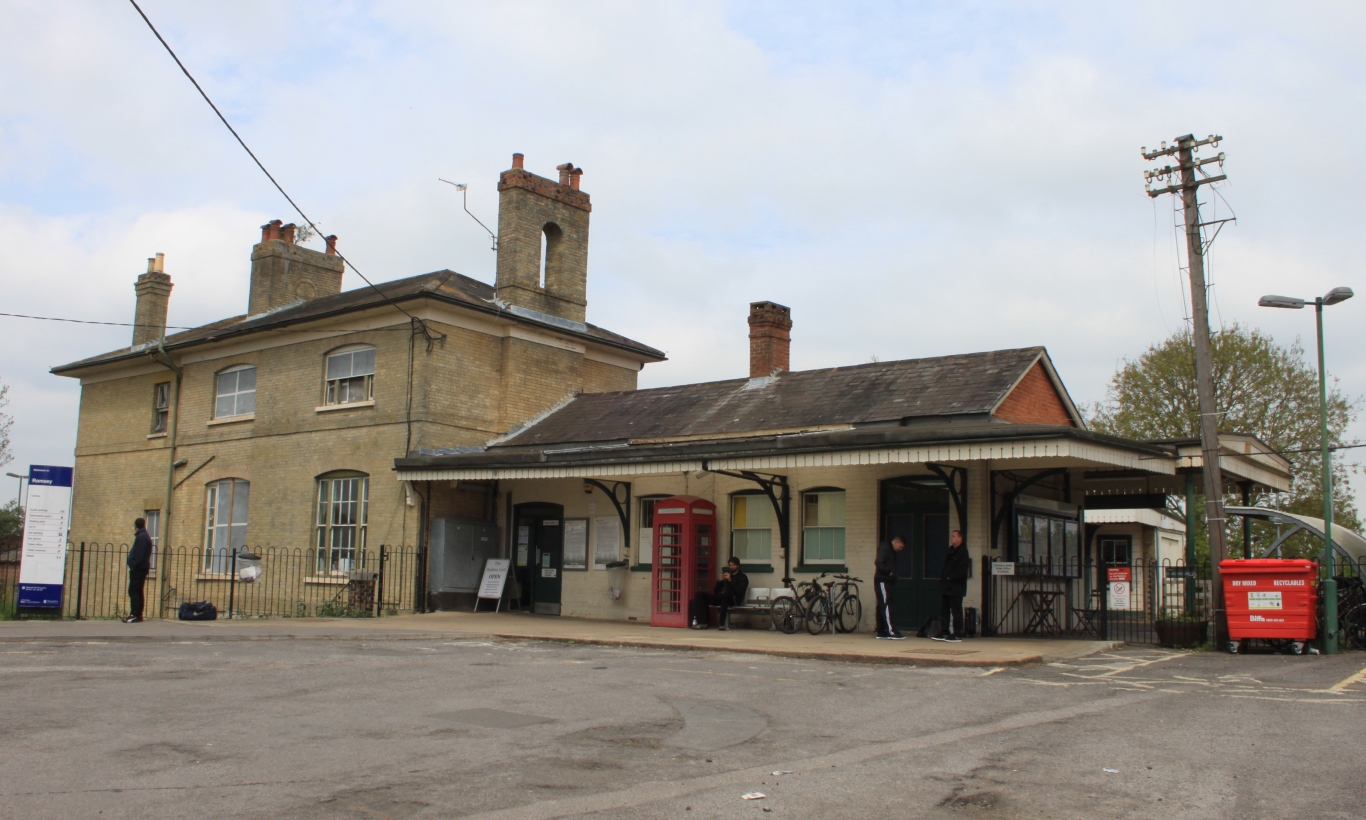

General information
- Location: Romsey, Test Valley; England
- Grid reference: SU356216
- Managed by: South Western Railway
- Platforms: 2

Other information
- Station code: ROM
- Classification: DfT category E

History
- Opened: 1 March 1847

Passengers
- 2020/21: ▼0.127 million
- 2021/22: ▲0.329 million
- 2022/23: ▲0.384 million
- 2023/24: ▲0.422 million
- 2024/25: ▲0.457 million
Location
Notes
- Passenger statistics from the Office of Rail and Road

Romsey railway station serves the town of Romsey in Hampshire, England. It is on the Wessex Main Line, at the junction for the Eastleigh to Romsey Line, 80 miles 47 chains (129.7 km) from London Waterloo. The station is a Grade II listed building.

== History ==
Romsey station was built by the London and South Western Railway on its line from Eastleigh to Salisbury and opened on 1 March 1847. It became a junction in 1865 when the Andover and Redbridge Railway (also known as the Sprat and Winkle Line) was opened: this joined the earlier route just east of the station before diverging again at Kimbridge Junction, a short distance to the north, en route to Andover. The subway connecting the two platforms was added in 1887. The waiting room has a collection of framed photographs from earliest times through to the mid-20th century. The signal box has been preserved and can be visited.

The Andover line fell victim to the Beeching Axe in September 1964, and the Eastleigh route closed to passengers in May 1969. The Eastleigh line remained open for freight traffic and as a diversionary route. The line to Eastleigh via Chandlers Ford regained regular passenger services in May 2003.

Previously managed by Great Western Railway, the station was transferred to South Western Railway in April 2020.

== Services ==
South Western Railway operates a "figure of six" service running from Salisbury to Romsey and Southampton via Redbridge, then to Eastleigh and back to Romsey via Chandler's Ford.

Great Western Railway runs services south-eastward to Southampton Central, Portsmouth Harbour, and north-westward to Salisbury, Bristol Temple Meads, and Cardiff Central.

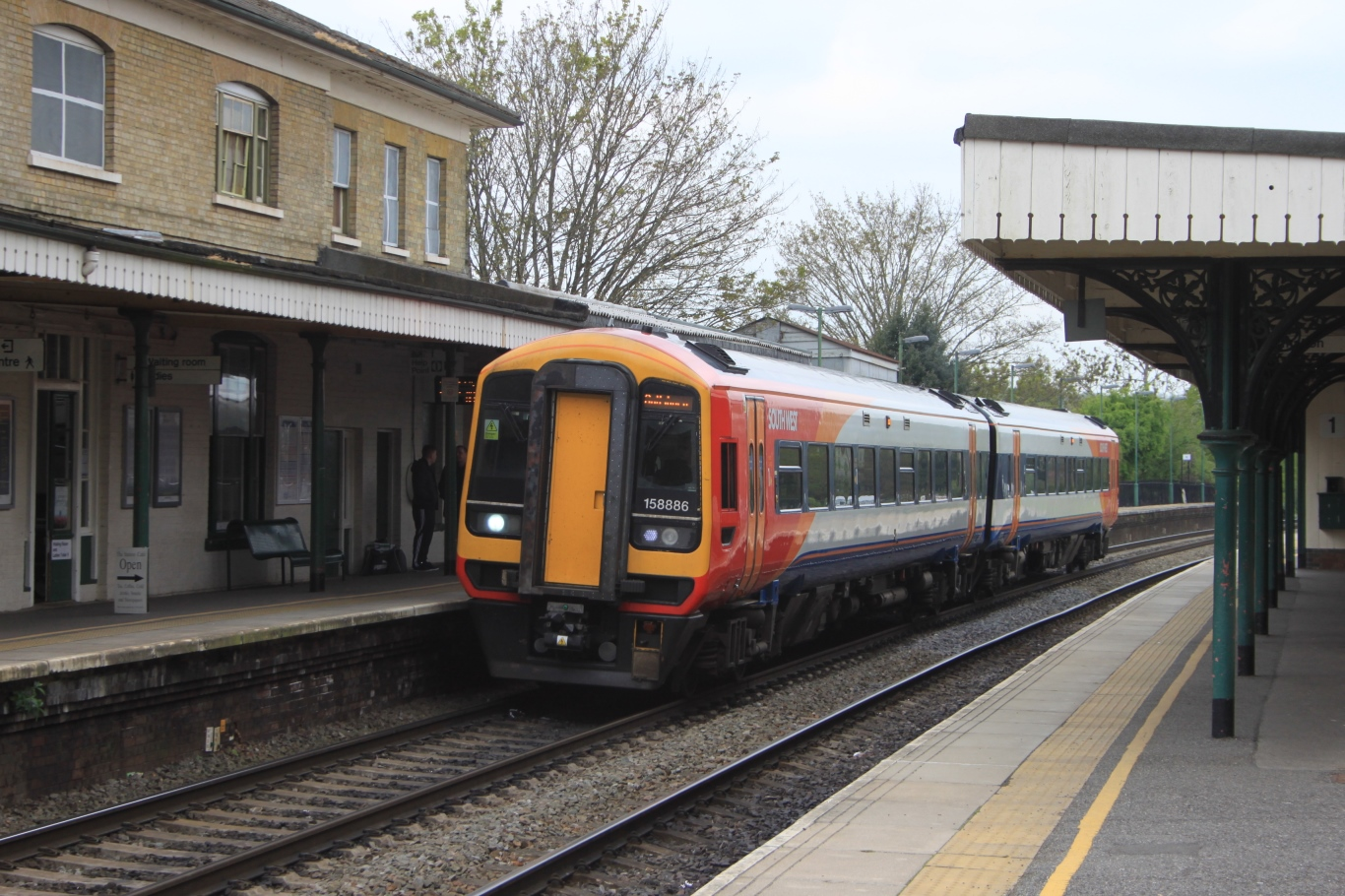
A South West Trains service to Southampton via Chandlers Ford

Preceding station	National Rail	Following station
Chandler's Ford	South Western Railway; Eastleigh to Romsey Line	Terminus
Mottisfont & Dunbridge	South Western Railway; Wessex Main Line	Redbridge
Salisbury	Great Western Railway; Wessex Main Line	Southampton Central
	Historical railways	
Nursling	London & South Western Railway; Andover and Redbridge railway	Mottisfont
