= Salisbury railway station =

Railway station in Wiltshire, England

Salisbury
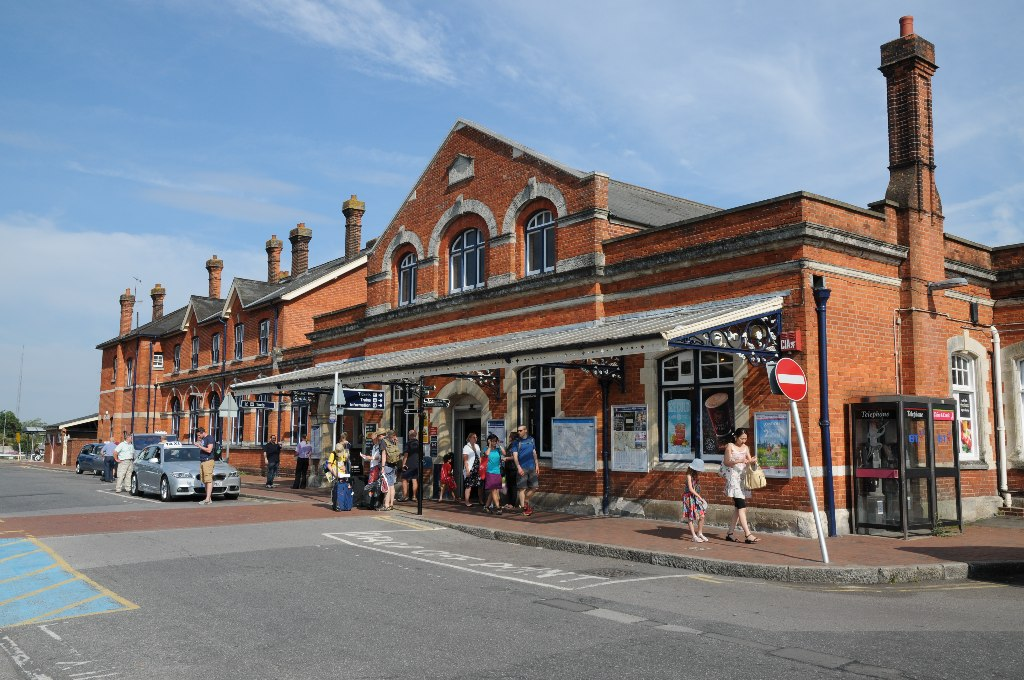

General information
- Location: Salisbury, Wiltshire; England
- Coordinates: 51.0705°N 1.8055°W
- Grid reference: SU136301
- Managed by: South Western Railway
- Platforms: 6 (4 in use)

Other information
- Station code: SAL
- Classification: DfT category C1

History
- Original company: Salisbury and Yeovil Railway
- Pre-grouping: London and South Western Railway
- Post-grouping: Southern Railway

Key dates
- 1859: Opened

Passengers
- 2020/21: ▼0.455 million
- Interchange: ▼41,127
- 2021/22: ▲1.289 million
- Interchange: ▲0.137 million
- 2022/23: ▲1.622 million
- Interchange: ▲0.218 million
- 2023/24: ▲1.812 million
- Interchange: ▲0.231 million
- 2024/25: ▲2.005 million
- Interchange: ▲0.248 million
Location
Notes
- Passenger statistics from the Office of Rail and Road

Salisbury railway station serves the cathedral city of Salisbury, in Wiltshire, England. It lies 83 miles 43 chains (134.4 km) from London Waterloo on the West of England line to Exeter St Davids; this is crossed by the Wessex Main Line from Bristol Temple Meads to Southampton Central. The station is operated and served by South Western Railway; Great Western Railway also operates some services.

== History ==
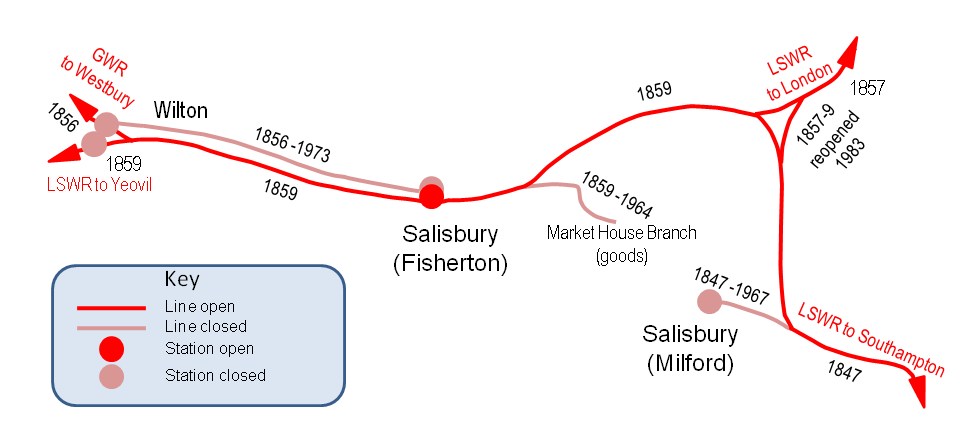
Railways in Salisbury

Three railway station sites have been used in Salisbury, owned by the London and South Western Railway (LSWR) from 1847 and the Great Western Railway (GWR) from 1856, as well as two further stations at Wilton, 2.5 miles (4 km) to the west.

=== London and South Western Railway ===
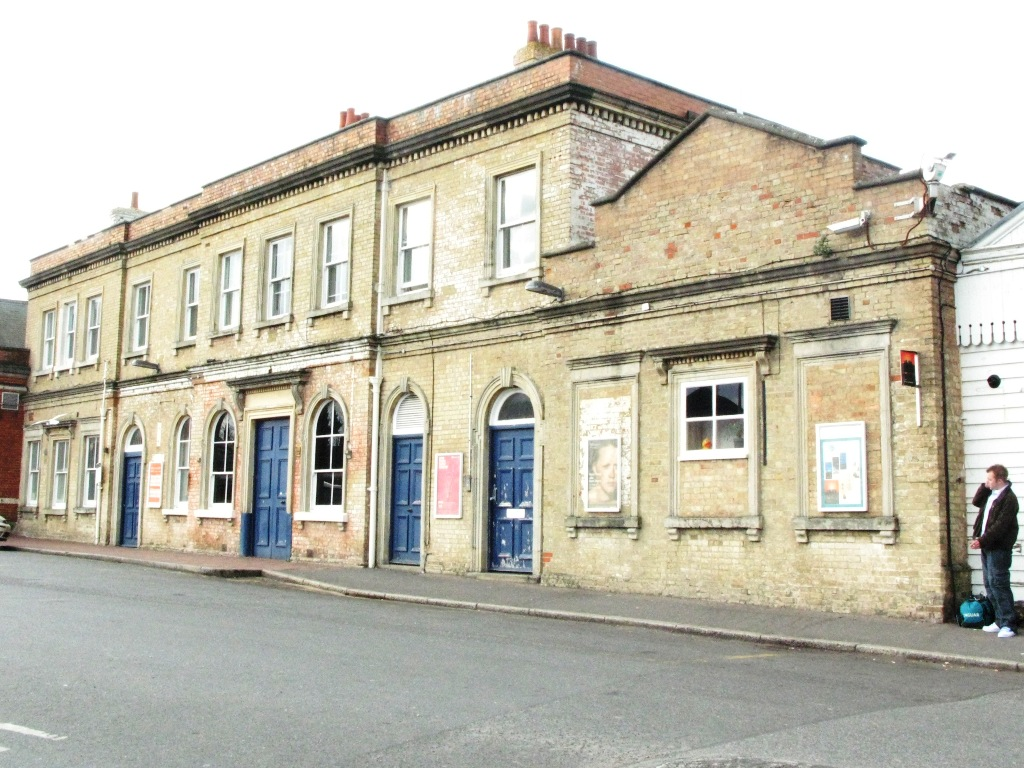
The original LSWR station

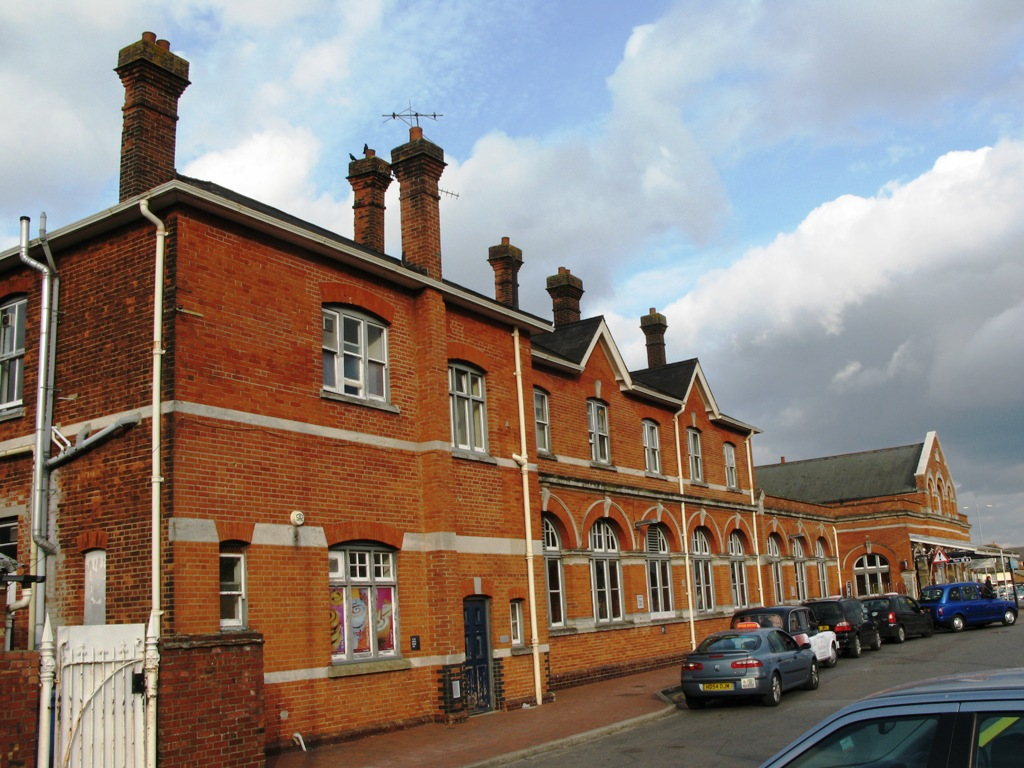
The new building of 1902

The LSWR opened their Milford station on the east side of the city on 1 March 1847, with the opening of their branch line from Eastleigh to passenger traffic. This was the city's only railway until 30 June 1856, when the GWR opened the Salisbury branch from Westbury. On 1 May 1857, the LSWR opened the extended main line from London and Andover, at first to the Milford station.

On 2 May 1859, the LSWR opened a station on the south side of the 1856 GWR station, west of Fisherton Street, to coincide with the opening of the first section of the Salisbury and Yeovil Railway. At the same time, the terminus of the Andover line moved to the new station, having been brought across the city, partly through a tunnel. The building is largely of two stories and has a central main entrance; the architect was Sir William Tite, who was responsible for a number of LSWR stations.

As the GWR and LSWR used different gauges, through goods traffic had to be unloaded and transhipped in a transfer shed; a covered footbridge was opened in 1860 linking the two stations, to allow passengers to change trains. The LSWR station had a single long platform served by trains in both directions and a second bay platform was provided at the London end.

In the 1870s, the LSWR opened a second platform, east of Fisherton Street, for services towards London. It had an entrance from the street and was linked to the old platform by a subway; there was another bay platform for trains to the east.

The LSWR station was again enlarged between 1899 and 1902, and the 1870s platform east of Fisherton Street could then be closed. Two new platforms serving three tracks were opened between the GWR platforms and the original LSWR one, reached by a subway from the LSWR's new station offices, which were built in red brick on the west side of their original building of 1859.

In 2008, the group of buildings (1859 and 1902) was designated as Grade II listed.

=== Great Western Railway ===
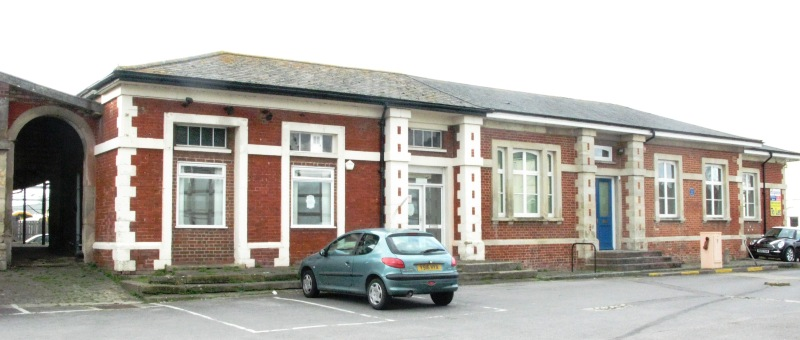
The former GWR station

The GWR opened their 7 ft (2,134 mm) broad gauge Salisbury branch line from Westbury on 30 June 1856. The terminus was on the west side of Salisbury on the west side of Fisherton Street. Isambard Kingdom Brunel provided a station with a wooden train shed to cover the tracks and a single-storey building of red brick with stone dressings to house booking offices and waiting rooms.

The GWR converted their line to 4 ft 8 1/2 in (1,435 mm) standard gauge in 1874, and four years later a connecting line was laid to the neighbouring 1859 LSWR station, which allowed wagons to be shunted between the two stations. In 1896, a through service between Cardiff on the GWR and Portsmouth on the LSWR began operating over a junction line at Salisbury. The two companies' lines ran alongside each other from Salisbury as far as Wilton (where they finally diverged, although there was no connection between the lines there) until October 1973, when a new junction between the lines was put in at Wilton and the former GWR route closed.

On 12 September 1932, GWR's passenger trains were transferred to the LSWR station, and the two railways were in common ownership by British Railways from 1 January 1948. The train shed was demolished, but Brunel's passenger buildings were designated as Grade II listed in 1972 and are in use as offices by non-railway businesses.

=== 21st century ===
In June 2024, Wiltshire Council began a project to refurbish the station's forecourt, using money from the government's Future High Streets fund. The project was expected to take around 12 months and cost £5.8 million; SWR had already provided a new cycle hub at a cost of £750,000. The work included landscaping, lighting improvements and creation of a bus interchange, and most car parking would be relocated to a new facility on Fisherton Street.

Until late 2009, services to Exeter would extend on a limited basis to Penzance, Plymouth and Paignton. These services were removed in favour of hourly Waterloo to Exeter services. Until December 2021, a limited number of South Western Railway services operated to Bristol Temple Meads, with a train dividing here from a service to Exeter.

In 2016, a new service began running once on summer Saturdays between London Waterloo and Weymouth; however, since 2020, the Saturday Weymouth services ceased due to the COVID-19 pandemic and there are no plans to reinstate them.

=== Goods facilities ===
The former Salisbury Milford station was used as a goods station until it was closed in 1967 and demolished in 1968. Goods traffic was also handled in goods sheds at the west end of the Fisherton station – north of the GWR station and south of the LSWR station – and also on the 460 yards (420 m) Market House branch from the east end of the LSWR station which opened in 1859. A new LSWR marshalling yard was opened on the site of the old platform east of Fisherton Street after it had closed in 1902, but the main LSWR goods depot was kept at the old Milford station until 1967. The former GWR station remained in use as a goods depot until 1991.

=== Motive power depots ===
An engine shed, water tower and turntable were erected on the Milford site from January 1847, as the line was then open for freight traffic. A replacement engine shed was built by the LSWR at Fisherton Street in 1859. The GWR also built a small engine shed adjacent to their station in April 1858. This was demolished in 1899, to allow expansion of the LSWR station, and a replacement was built on the north side of the line. This was closed by British Railways in 1950.

A large new and well equipped engine shed was opened by the LSWR on 12 January 1901. This remained in use until the end of steam in southern England on 9 July 1967. The shed lay derelict for some years before being demolished.

The sidings around the former GWR station were redeveloped in 1992 as Salisbury Traincare Depot, where South Western Railway maintains their fleet of diesel multiple units.

=== Accidents and incidents ===
In the early morning of 1 July 1906, an overnight boat train derailed in Salisbury station, killing 24 passengers and 4 railwaymen.

On 31 October 2021, an SWR train collided with a GWR train at Salisbury Tunnel Junction, approximately 1 mile (1.6 km) north-east of the station.

== Description ==
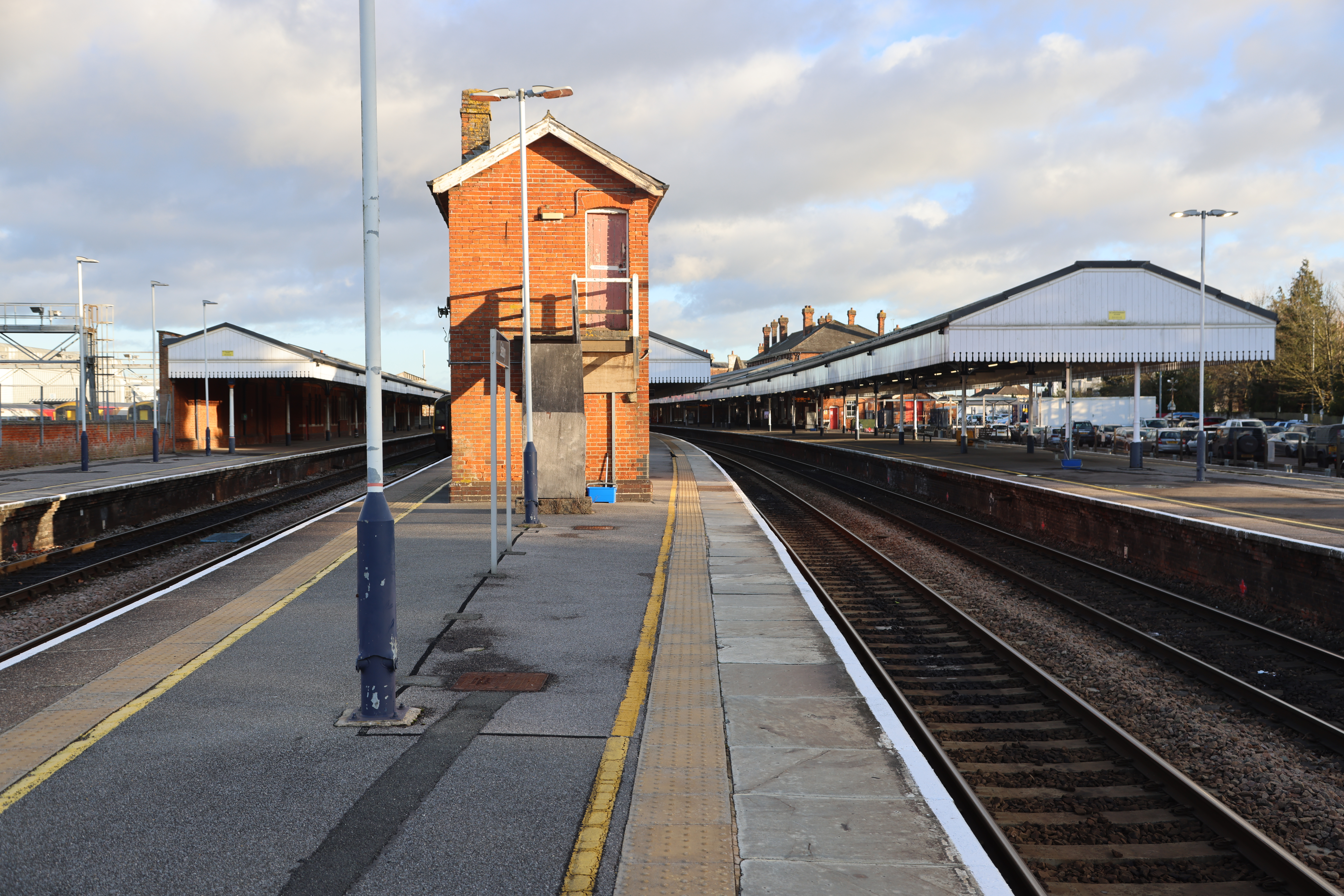
View of the station from the west end of platforms 2 and 3. Platform 4 is on the right.

The approach road from the city is accessed from a junction on the south side of the railway bridge across Fisherton Street, which leads into a one-way car park with 287 spaces. The large building on the right of the approach road is the old LSWR buildings of 1859, which now houses the Salisbury signal panel. Immediately next door is the red brick building of 1902, now the main entrance where the ticket office and buffet are located.

The main platform adjacent to the entrance is platform 4, which is mainly used for trains towards Exeter and Cardiff, as is platform 3 opposite. This is one side of an island platform, the opposite side of which is platform 2 which is used by trains to London Waterloo and Portsmouth Harbour. Platform 5 is a bay platform at the west end which is no longer used by passenger trains. Terminal platform 6 is an eastwards extension of platform 4; it is used predominantly by London Waterloo trains terminating here and local services to Southampton Central.

Beyond platform 2 is the disused platform 1, now used as the reception siding for Salisbury Traincare Depot. Behind this are the sidings of the Traincare Depot; at the east end of this is an old water tank and the brick offices which once served the GWR station.

== Services ==
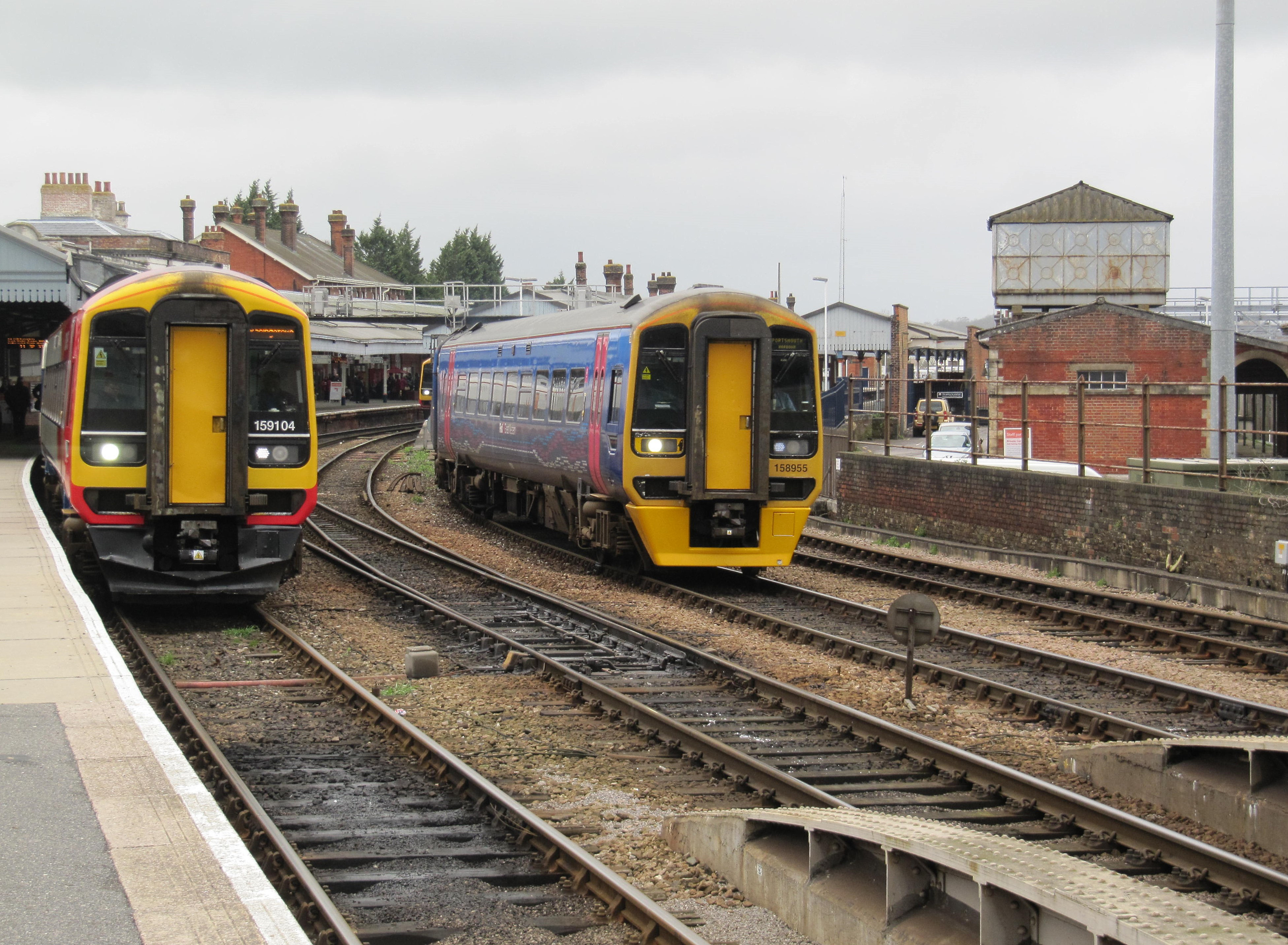
South Western Railway and Great Western Railway trains pass at Salisbury

Salisbury is served by two train operating companies:

- South Western Railway operates half-hourly services to London Waterloo and hourly to Exeter St Davids. There is also an hourly circular service to Romsey via Southampton Central and Eastleigh (therefore calling at Romsey twice), with limited services to Yeovil Pen Mill.
- Great Western Railway operates hourly regional services between Portsmouth Harbour and Cardiff Central via Bristol Temple Meads, as well as some slower services between here and Bristol Temple Meads only.

In 2022, South Western Railway added a Welcome Host at the station; a staff member provides information to customers and sells tickets.

Preceding station	National Rail	Following station
Warminster	Great Western Railway; Wessex Main Line	Romsey
Tisbury	South Western Railway; West of England Main Line	Grateley or Andover
Warminster	South Western Railway; Wessex Main Line	Grateley or Andover
Tisbury	South Western Railway; London Waterloo to Frome	Grateley or Andover
Terminus	South Western Railway; London-Salisbury stopping services	Grateley
Terminus	South Western Railway; Wessex Main Line	Dean
	Disused railways	
Terminus	Southern Region; Salisbury and Dorset Junction Railway	Downton
