= Great Northern route =

Suburban rail service in London and the East of England

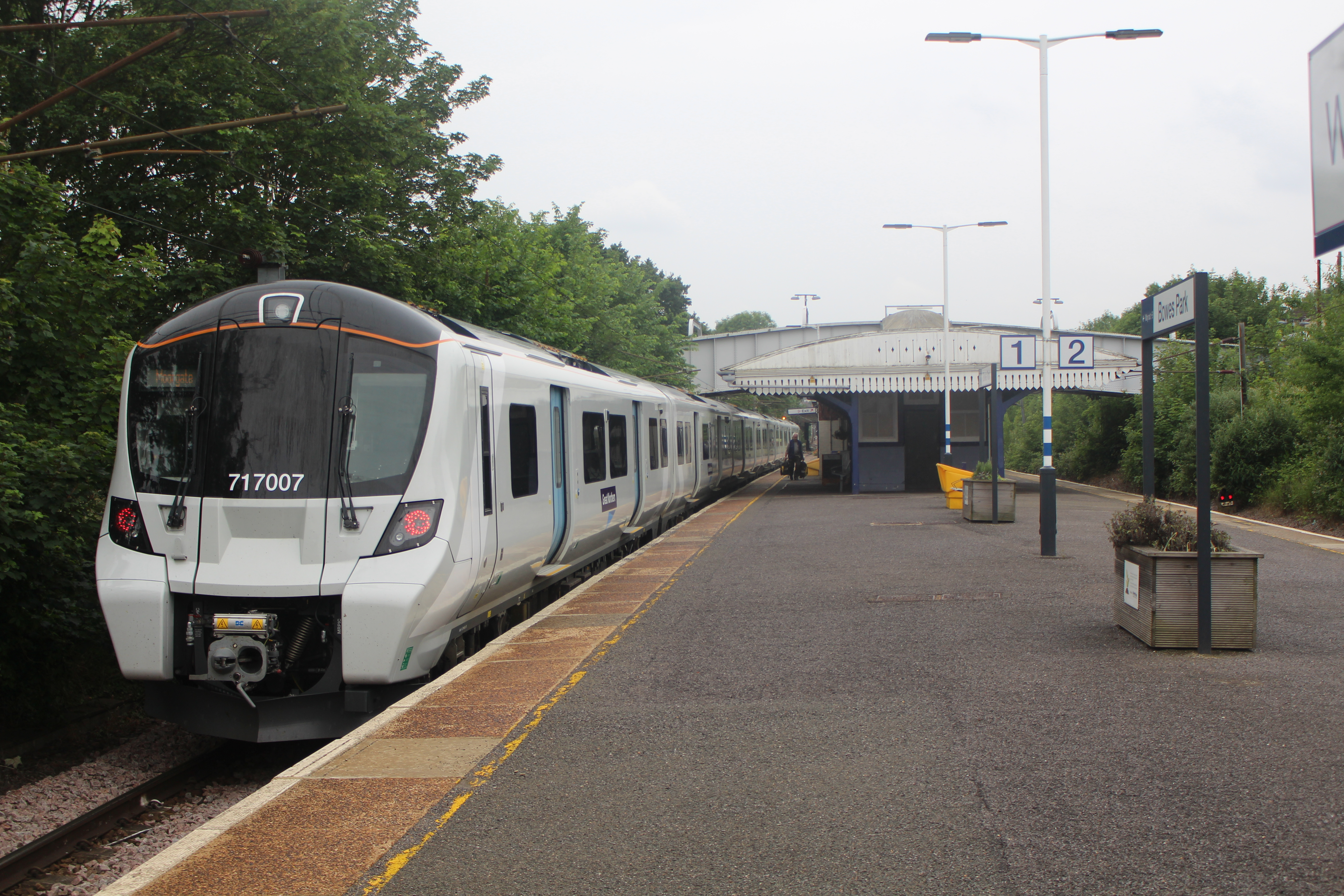
- A Class 717 standing at Bowes Park

Overview
- Franchises: West Anglia Great Northern (1997–2006); First Capital Connect (2006–2014); Govia Thameslink Railway (2014–2026); Greater Thameslink Railway (2026–)
- Main regions: East of England; Greater London
- Fleet: Class 379 Electrostar; Class 387 Electrostar; Class 717 Desiro City
- Stations called at: 55 (list)
- Reporting mark: GN

Technical
- Track gauge: 1,435 mm (4 ft 8 1/2 in) standard gauge
- Electrification: 25 kV 50 Hz AC OHLE; 750 V DC third rail

Other
- Website: www.greatnorthernrail.com
System map
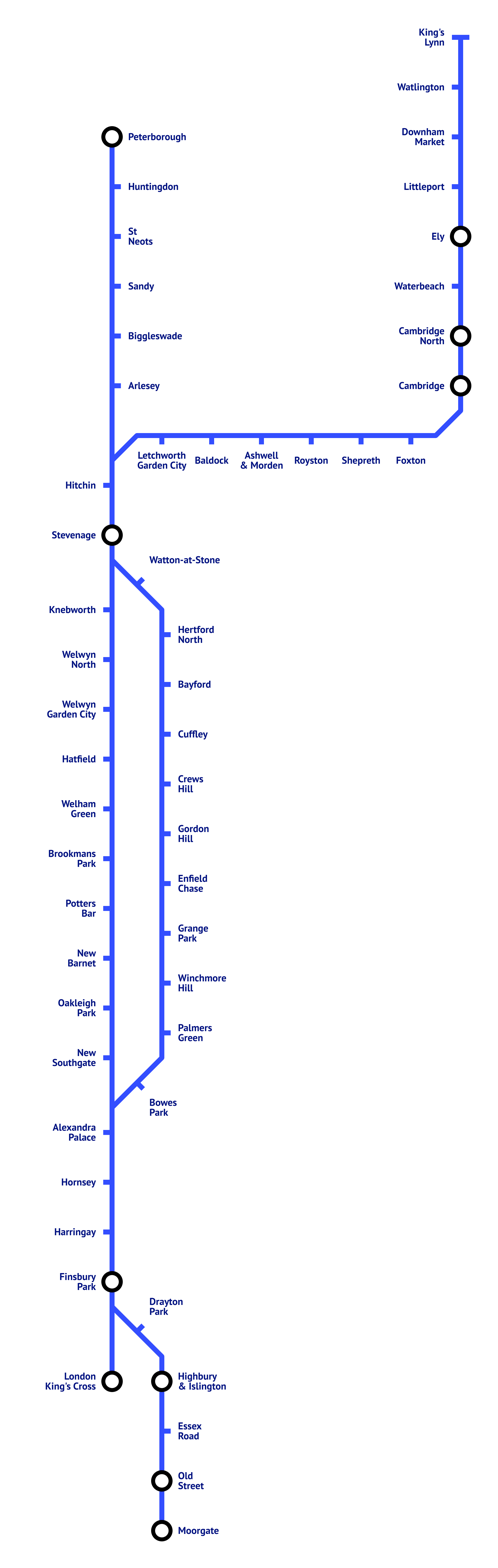

The Great Northern route, referred to in official documents as the Great Northern Inners (GNI), is a suburban rail route in London and the East of England. The route consists of services on the southern end of the East Coast Main Line, which is the main railway link between the cities of London and Edinburgh, as well as its associated branches, including the Cambridge line, Fen line, Hertford Loop line, and Northern City Line.

The route is currently operated by Great Northern, which is one brand under the umbrella of the state-owned train operating company Greater Thameslink Railway. Services originating at London King's Cross operate to Peterborough, Letchworth Garden City, Cambridge, Ely, and Kings Lynn, whereas services originating at Moorgate operate to Welwyn Garden City, Hertford North, Gordon Hill, and Stevenage. The route forms a major commuter route into London from Hertfordshire, Cambridgeshire, and eastern Bedfordshire; ridership has grown rapidly over recent years.

== History ==
The Great Northern route is formed of the Northern City Line, Hertford Loop line, the southern section of the East Coast Main Line between London Kings Cross and Peterborough, the Cambridge line, and the Fen line. Since Greater Anglia withdrew its services to King's Lynn in May 2023, Govia Thameslink Railway became the sole operator of the entire route except between London Kings Cross and Peterborough, and between Cambridge and Ely. The route serves 55 stations.

The term Great Northern is related to the Great Northern Railway (GNR), the original builders of the line.

The July 1922 Bradshaw's Railway Guide stated a typical rail service on the Cambridge Line as follows:

- London King's Cross to Cambridge - Six stopping and two (three on Saturday) semi-fast services from Monday to Saturday, one northbound and two southbound stopping services on Sunday. The fastest service took about 1 hour 30 minutes.
- London King's Cross to Royston - Two (three on Wednesday) additional services from Monday to Saturday, one additional service on Sunday.
- London King's Cross to Baldock - Seven additional services from Monday to Saturday.
- London King's Cross to Letchworth - Three additional services from Monday to Saturday. The last service on Wednesday ran past midnight into Thursday morning.

=== British Rail ===
Since the 1960s, the term Great Northern has been used to describe the suburban part of the East Coast Main Line and its branches, rather than the original extent of the GNR. The GNR had proposed electrification of part of the line in 1903, but it was not until 1971 that a scheme to electrify the line from London King's Cross and Moorgate was authorised. Electrification reached Welwyn Garden City and Hertford North on 3 November 1976, with EMU services starting on 8 November. The previous weekend, services over the non-electrified route to Broad Street and Farringdon were withdrawn. The first electric units used for suburban services were Class 313s, followed by Class 312 in February 1978. From that point, the route was promoted as 'Great Northern Electrics'.

The Cambridge Line was chosen for electrification in 1978, primarily because it allowed an alternative electrified route to London while essential upgrade works were carried out on the West Anglia Main Line. However, electrification was not pursued further than Royston as it was not considered value-for-money to electrify as far as Cambridge. This meant that the through service was severed, and passengers had to change from the electrified service at Royston to a diesel train service to Cambridge. On 4 March 1987, approval was given by Network SouthEast for the extension of electrification as far as Cambridge; electric operation commenced on 16 May 1988.

In 1982 Watton-at-Stone station was reopened between Hertford and Stevenage. A new station also opened at Welham Green in 1986. With the further electrification of the East Coast Main Line between 1986 and 1988, electric services could be extended to Peterborough and the outer suburban service was changed from Class 312 to Class 317, some of which were cascaded from the newly created Thameslink route, with the remainder newly built.

In the late 1980s, introduction of new driver-only operation (DOO) services on the route were hindered by ongoing industrial disputes between British Rail, ASLEF, and the National Union of Railwaymen. These services were originally planned to coincide with the upgrades to the line, and were planned for September 1985 notwithstanding union intervention, which occurred when signallers at King's Cross who demanded increased pay. DOO disputes were eventually solved nationally in 1987 and 1988, when new pay rates and career paths for affected staff were agreed respectively.

=== Privatisation ===
At privatisation the services became part of West Anglia Great Northern, becoming their sole route in 2004 when the West Anglia services were transferred to 'one'. In April 2006 the services became the responsibility of First Capital Connect. In September 2014, the Department for Transport transferred the new Thameslink, Southern and Great Northern franchise to Govia Thameslink Railway. Passenger services on the Great Northern route, along with all others operated by Govia Thameslink Railway, transferred to Greater Thameslink Railway on 31 May 2026.

In 2006, the Office of Rail and Road released a document entitled Issues in Defining and Measuring Railway Capacity, in which they discussed various capacity issues on the East Coast Main Line and projects aiming to mitigate them. Commenting on the idea of a flyover at Hitchin, they argued such a project "would undoubtedly make pathing more flexible and operations more robust"; however, they also said that it would not increase capacity as it was Digswell Viaduct that was the limiting factor on the number of services ran.

The subsequent construction of the Hitchin Flyover came about as part of a £47 million package into East Coast Main Line improvement work to reduce delays and increase capacity. Network Rail predicted that the flyover would decrease delays by 30,000 minutes/year. The plan for the flyover was set out in the Network Rail (Hitchin (Cambridge Junction)) Order 2011 (SI 2011/1072), which was a statutory instrument permitting its construction by Network Rail. It was published on 31 March and came into force on 21 April. In November 2011, the Department for Transport listed the flyover as an 'existing infrastructure project' in its annual National Infrastructure Plan. Construction was completed in June 2013. In order to minimise disruption to the East Coast Main Line, the viaduct section was installed during night-time possessions of the railway, before installing crash decking which allowed work on the viaduct to continue during the day when the line below was active.

A station to the south of Cambridge was first proposed in 2017, and although its application to New Stations Fund 2 that year was unsuccessful, the November 2017 budget allocated it £5 million in funding. The station, called Cambridge South, is situated between Foxton and Cambridge on the Cambridge line, serving the Cambridge Biomedical Campus and the wider Trumpington area. The station was opened in June 2026, which is a delay from the originally proposed date of late 2025. The station is managed by Greater Anglia and is served by all Greater Anglia, Great Northern, Thameslink and CrossCountry services passing through the station. Additionally, East West Rail services will also call at Cambridge South in the future, once East West Rail has been built to Cambridge and opened.

Network Rail (Hitchin (Cambridge Junction)) Order 2011
- Statutory Instrument
- Parliament of the United Kingdom
- Citation: SI 2011/1072

Dates
- Made: 31 March 2011
- Commencement: 21 April 2011
Other legislation
Made under	Transport and Works Act 1992

Text of statute as originally enacted

== Services ==
The Great Northern service pattern, as of June 2026, with frequencies in trains per hour (tph), consists of the following:

Route	tph	Calling at
Moorgate – Welwyn Garden City	2	Old Street; Essex Road; Highbury & Islington; Drayton Park; Finsbury Park; Harringay; Hornsey; Alexandra Palace; New Southgate; Oakleigh Park; New Barnet; Hadley Wood; Potters Bar; Brookmans Park, Welham Green; Hatfield
Moorgate – Stevenage via Hertford North	2	Old Street; Essex Road; Highbury & Islington; Drayton Park; Finsbury Park; Harringay; Hornsey; Alexandra Palace; Bowes Park; Palmers Green; Winchmore Hill; Grange Park; Enfield Chase; Gordon Hill; Crews Hill; Cuffley; Bayford; Hertford North; Watton-at-Stone
London King's Cross – Letchworth Garden City	1	Finsbury Park; Alexandra Palace; Potters Bar; Hatfield; Welwyn Garden City; Welwyn North; Knebworth; Stevenage; Hitchin
London King's Cross – Cambridge	1	Finsbury Park; Alexandra Palace; Potters Bar; Hatfield; Welwyn Garden City; Welwyn North; Knebworth; Stevenage; Hitchin; Letchworth Garden City; Baldock; Royston; Meldreth; Shepreth; Foxton; Cambridge South
London King's Cross – Ely	1	Cambridge South; Cambridge; Cambridge North; Waterbeach
London King's Cross – King's Lynn	1	Cambridge South; Cambridge; Cambridge North; Waterbeach; Ely; Littleport; Downham Market; Watlington

== Rolling stock ==
=== Current fleet ===
The majority of Great Northern services are operated with Class 379 Electrostar units. On 12 March 2024 it was announced that Great Northern would lease 30 Class 379 units from Porterbrook. These were introduced for their services to Letchworth Garden City in February 2025, which replaced Class 387 units in order to allow them to be transferred to Southern.

Family	Class	Image	Type	Top speed		Number	Carriages	Routes operated	Began operation
Family	Class	Image	Type	mph	km/h	Number	Carriages	Routes operated	Began operation
Bombardier Electrostar	379		EMU	100	160	30	4	London King's Cross to Ely/King's Lynn; London King's Cross to Letchworth Garden City/Cambridge	2025
Bombardier Electrostar	387		EMU	110	177	12	4	London King's Cross to Ely/King's Lynn; London King's Cross to Letchworth Garden City/Cambridge	2016
Siemens Desiro	717 Desiro City		EMU	85	137	25	6	Moorgate to Welwyn Garden City; Moorgate to Stevenage via Hertford North	2018

=== Past fleet ===
Trains formerly used on the Great Northern route include, but are not limited to, the following:

Family	Class	Image	Type	Top speed		Cars	Number	Routes operated	Built	Withdrawn	Notes
Family	Class	Image	Type	mph	km/h	Cars	Number	Routes operated	Built	Withdrawn	Notes
BREL 1972	313		EMU	75	120	3	44	Moorgate to Welwyn Garden City; Moorgate to Hertford North/Watton-at-Stone	1976–1977	2019	Replaced by Class 717
BR Second Generation (Mark 3)	317		EMU	100	160	4	12	London King's Cross to Cambridge; London King's Cross to Peterborough	1981–1982	2017	Replaced by Class 387
BR Second Generation (Mark 3)	321		EMU	100	160	4	13	London King's Cross to Cambridge; London King's Cross to Peterborough	1989–1990	2016	Replaced by Class 387
Networker	365 Networker Express		EMU	100	160	4	40	London King's Cross to Cambridge/Ely; London King's Cross to Peterborough	1994–1995	2021	Replaced by Class 387
Bombardier Electrostar	387/2		EMU	110	177	4	8	London King's Cross to Ely/King's Lynn	2016–2017	2022	Replaced by Class 387/3

== Future developments ==
=== East West Rail ===
The route of East West Rail, the new railway linking the cities of Oxford and Cambridge, will intersect with the East Coast Main Line at Tempsford in Bedfordshire, where a new station will be built to serve both routes. This has led to worry from local residents, particularly due to a report by East West Rail that the population of the village could grow from 600 to 44,000. As a result of extra funding in the 2024 budget, East West Rail will deliver the station five years earlier than planned, allowing passengers on the East Coast Main Line to access the station before it opens as part of the East West Rail route.

Both Cambridge South and Cambridge stations on the Cambridge line will also be served by East West Rail, the Bedford–Cambridge section of which is in consultation as of 2025. The current plan for the route will include a grade-separated junction with the line at Hauxton, between Foxton and Cambridge. This will include improvements to Hauxton level crossing. East West Rail confirmed in their 2021 consultation that the Cambridge line will remain double-tracked between this junction and Shepreth Junction, where the line will be quadrupled to run alongside the West Anglia Main Line as far as Cambridge.

=== East Coast Digital Programme ===
The signalling on the southern section of the East Coast Main Line had been commissioned in 1977, and was due for replacement between 2020 and 2029. Instead, it was decided to upgrade to ERTMS in-cab signalling, the most complicated addition to UK in-cab signalling routes so far due to the multi-modal use of the line with frequent branching and track-sharing. The programme was named the East Coast Digital Programme and was allcoated £1.2bn in funding. In 2011, Network Rail had tested ERTMS on the Hertford Loop line using a Class 313 test vehicle. In September 2021, the Class 717s' ETCS was successfully tested in the Thameslink core between St Pancras International and Blackfriars, which allowed Govia Thameslink Railway to begin work towards use on the Northern City Line.

The first works towards ETCS on the Northern City Line took place in May 2022. The new signalling system was approved in March 2023, and by November 2024, all passenger services were operated under ETCS signalling, with traditional lineside signals completely removed on 18 May 2025. The Class 387 fleet used on the Great Northern route is also having ETCS retrofitted, with the first unit sent to Worksop Depot in October 2022 and the rest being completed at Hornsey Depot. On 31 August 2026, Great Northern services between Welwyn Garden City and Moorgate, operated using Class 717s, began only using ETCS to complete their journeys.

=== TfL takeover ===
On 20 September 2025, Transport for London (TfL) submitted an outline business case to take over Great Northern services from Moorgate to Welwyn Garden City, Hertford North, and Stevenage and integrate them into the London Overground network. TfL wants to increase the number of trains from two trains per hour to four trains per hour, standardise fares across the route, serve a 21,000 home development at Crews Hill, and boost growth in North London and Hertfordshire. The takeover could occur in Autumn 2027 if approval is given by DfT. Services would be run using existing Class 717 trains.

== Sources ==
- East West Rail Co (May 2023). Route Update Report (PDF) (Report). Archived from the original on 31 May 2023.
- Gillham, J C (1988). The Age of the Electric Train: Electric Trains in Britain since 1883. Shepperton: Ian Allan. ISBN 978-0711013926.
- Gourvish, Terry (2002). British Rail 1974-97: From Integration to Privatisation. Oxford University Press. ISBN 978-0199250059.
- Mott, Allan; Mitchell, Vic (2006). Potters Bar to Cambridge. Midhurst: Middleton Press. ISBN 1-904474-70-5.
