= List of Great Northern route stations =

Great Northern route stations
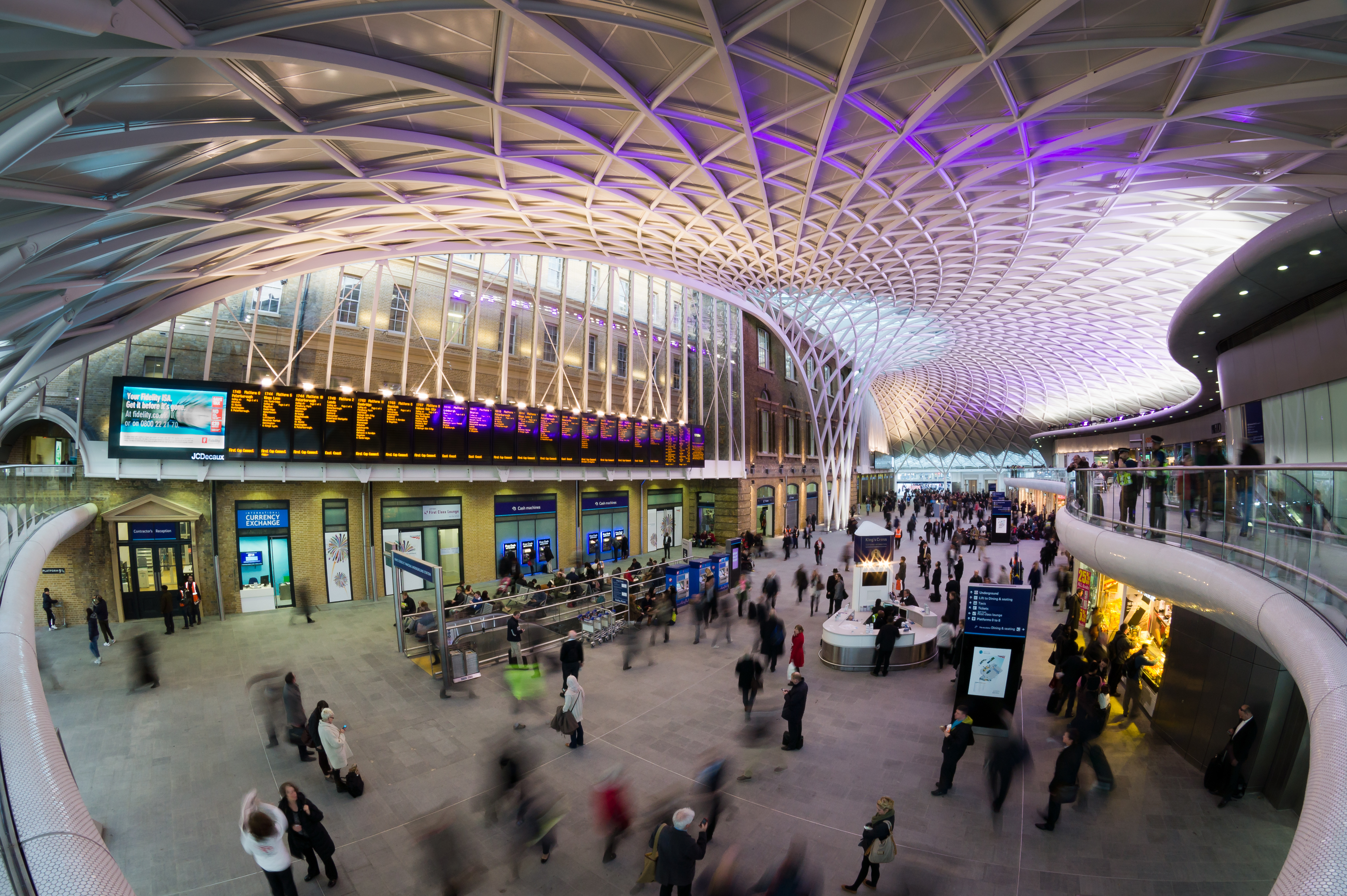
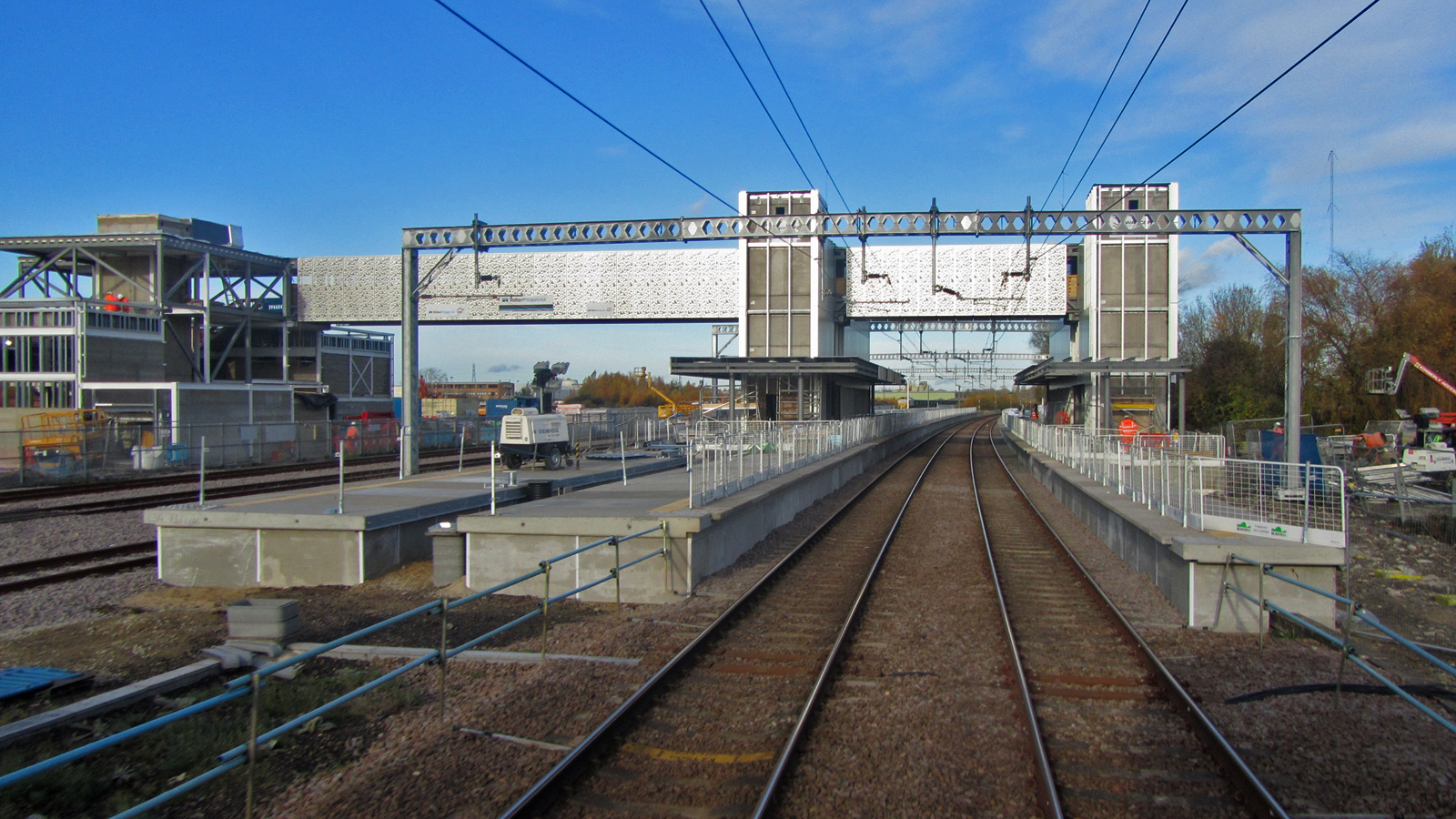
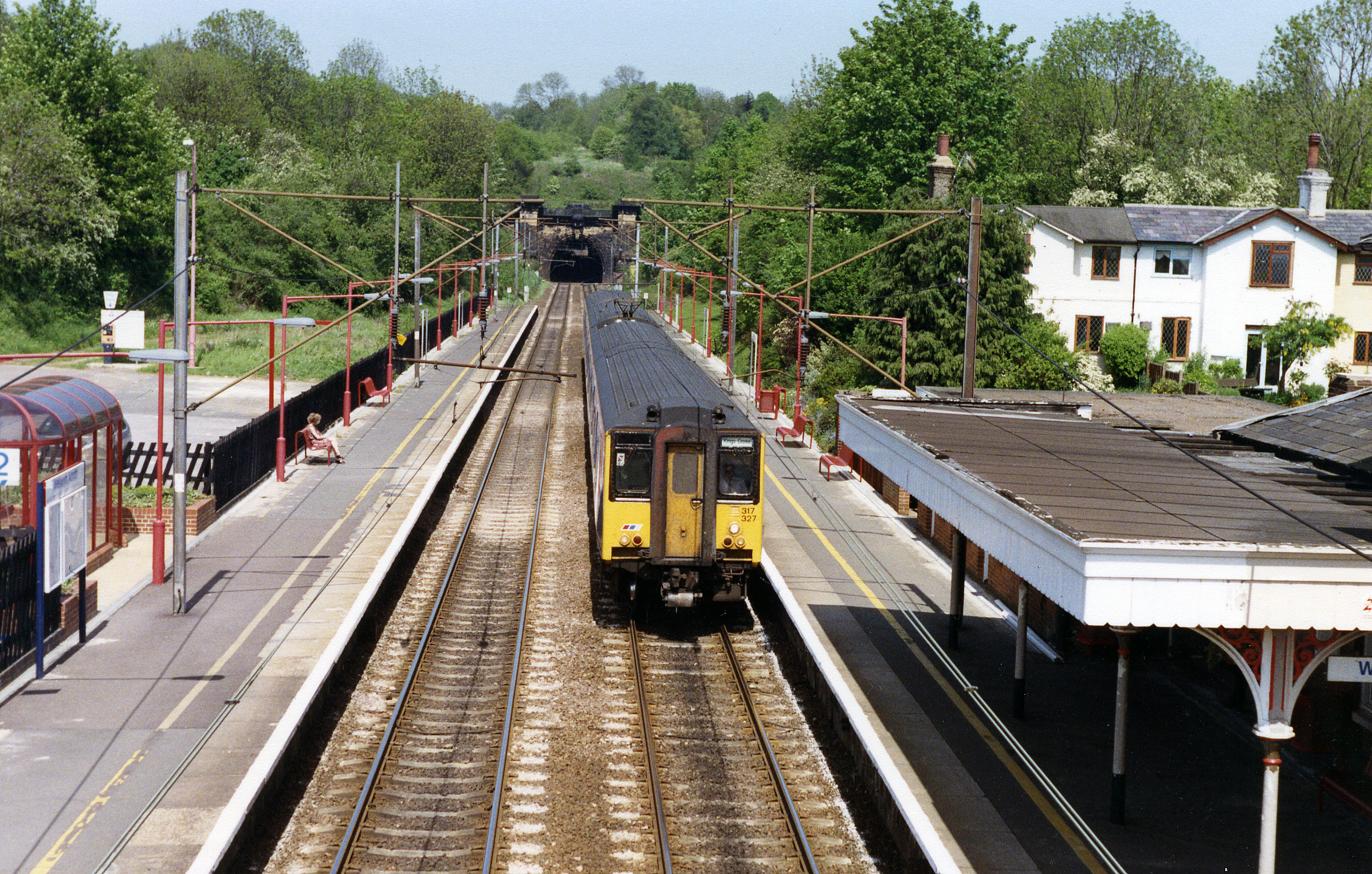
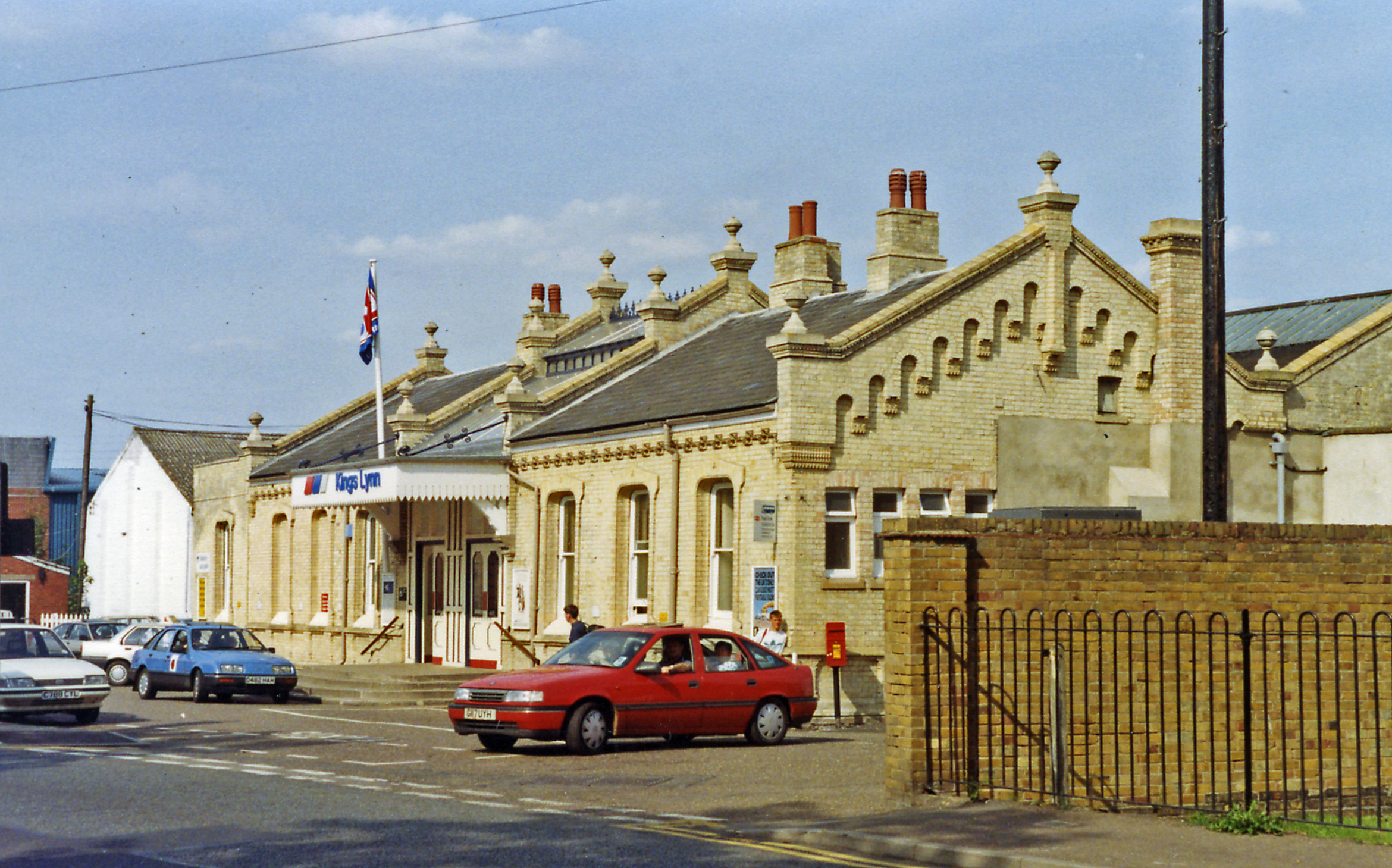
- 'Top left:' London King's Cross, the southern terminus of the East Coast Main Line, is the busiest and the only Grade I listed station on the route.
- 'Top right:' Cambridge North (photographed under construction) was the most recent station to open in 2017.
- 'Bottom left:' Welwyn North (originally Welwyn) was where the inaugural train on the route stopped for its passengers to see the Digswell Viaduct.
- 'Bottom right:' King's Lynn, the northern terminus of the Fen line, is the most northerly station on the route.

The Great Northern route is a suburban rail route in London and the East of England. The route consists of services on the southern end of the East Coast Main Line, which is the main railway link between the cities of London and Edinburgh, as well as its associated branches, including the Cambridge line, Fen line, Hertford Loop line, and Northern City Line.

The route is currently operated by Great Northern, which is one brand under the umbrella of Greater Thameslink Railway, having taken over from Govia Thameslink Railway in 2026. Services originating at London King's Cross operate to Peterborough, Letchworth Garden City, Cambridge, Ely, and King's Lynn, whereas services originating at Moorgate operate to Welwyn Garden City, Hertford North, Gordon Hill, and Stevenage.

== Statistics ==
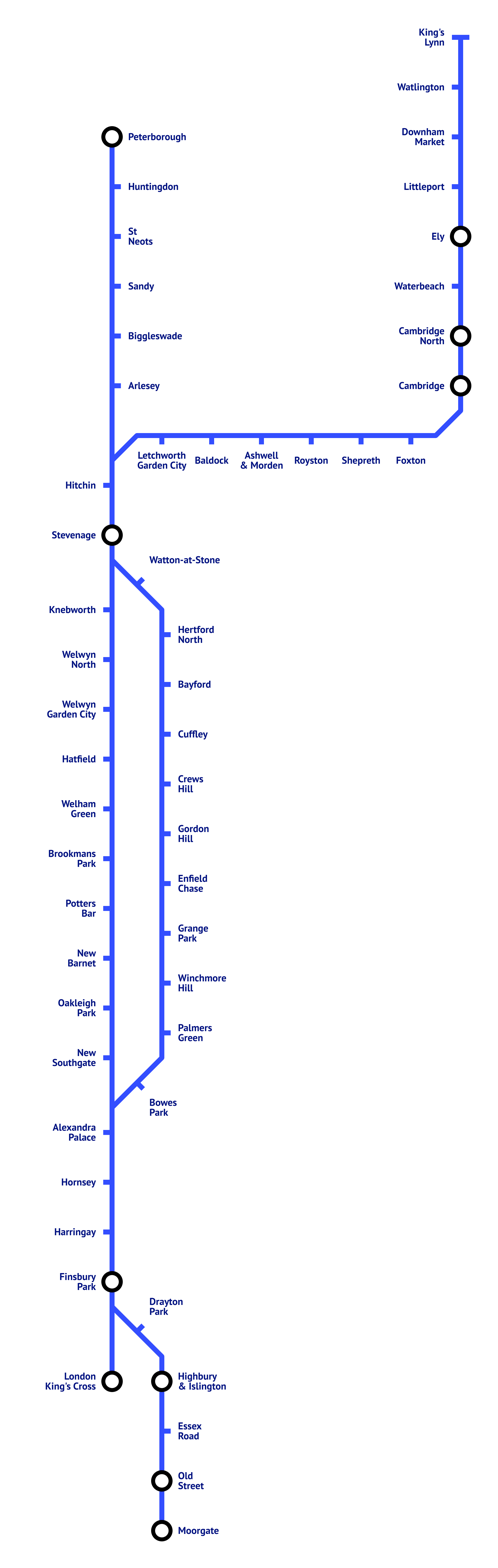
Route map

In all, there are 57 stations on the route, of which London King's Cross is Grade I listed and various parts of eight stations (Biggleswade, Cambridge, Downham Market, Huntingdon, King's Lynn, Letchworth Garden City, Moorgate, and Welwyn North) are Grade II listed. Historic England define Grades I and II as buildings of "exceptional interest" and of "special interest" respectively. The total number of stations will grow to 58 when the new station with allocated funding, at Tempsford, opens to passengers.

Of the stations on the route, Greater Thameslink Railway only share eight stations (King's Cross, Stevenage, Peterborough, Cambridge, Cambridge North, Cambridge South, Waterbeach and Ely) with other National Rail operators; this will rise to nine once Tempsford opens. Five stations are served by the London Underground (Moorgate, Old Street, Highbury & Islington, London King's Cross, and Finsbury Park), and four stations have out of station interchange capability (London King's Cross, Moorgate, Harringay, and Bowes Park). Until Greater Anglia withdrew their services to King's Lynn in May 2023, all the Fen line stations were shared between the two operators, but this is no longer the case.

Great Northern manages all except nine of their stations; one is managed by Network Rail (London King's Cross), one is managed by LNER (Peterborough), four are managed by Greater Anglia (Cambridge, Cambridge North, Cambridge South, and Ely), and three are managed by London Underground (Moorgate, Old Street, and Highbury & Islington). Once East West Rail opens, it will provide interchange with three stations on the route at Tempsford (construction approved), Cambridge South, and Cambridge.

There are also nineteen former stations on lines that remain open as part of the route, of which five were replaced by now-open stations (Chesterton, Cambridge South, Enfield, Maiden Lane, and Stevenage). Almost half of these closures came during the 1950s and 1960s, a period which included the Beeching cuts. The length of time these stations remained open varies greatly, from four days (Trumpington) to 122 years (Stevenage). Various proposals for the reopening of other closed stations exist, but none are promoted by the Campaign for Better Transport.

== Stations ==
‡ Constituent line of the Great Northern route

Great Northern route stations that are currently open
Station	Station building	Listing	Line(s)	Number of platforms	Opened	Local authority	Annual usage (thousands) (Note: Annual usage calculated as the sum of entries, exits, and interchanges at the station. All values to three significant figures.)	Managed by
Alexandra Palace	A yellow brick building with a ramp in front photographed from across the street. On the side of a building there is a sign with a double arrow logo on it.		‡ East Coast Main Line	4 (facing 6 tracks)	1 May 1859	London Borough of Haringey	1,890	Great Northern
Arlesey	A red brick building with a black roof. It has stairs on the left and a ramp on the right leading up to it. On both sides there are bushes, which slightly obscures the building on the right.		‡ East Coast Main Line	2 (facing 4 tracks)	7 August 1850	Central Bedfordshire	688	Great Northern
Ashwell & Morden	A white-brick station building taken from across the road with a telephone box in front. On the right side of the building there is a door and steps leading down.		‡ Cambridge line	2	21 October 1850	South Cambridgeshire	173	Great Northern
Baldock	A yellow-brick building partially painted white viewed from across the road. The windows on the right-hand side are covered up with a clock above, and the windows on the left hand side are in situ. Above the left-hand windows a sign reads "Welcome to Baldock"		‡ Cambridge line	2	21 October 1850	North Hertfordshire	569	Great Northern
Bayford	A sepia photo of a very small concrete building viewed from down the road. It has a fence on one side and wall on the other, with a car and a bus stop inside. A sign above the door reads "British Railways / BAYFORD"		‡ Hertford Loop line	2	2 June 1924	East Hertfordshire	78.9	Great Northern
Biggleswade	A yellow-brick building viewed from across the road with a car parked in front. A canopy hangs over part of the facade with a sign on it that says "Biggleswade". To the left of the building there is a gateway.	II (Note: Only the platform building is listed.)	‡ East Coast Main Line	4	7 August 1850	Central Bedfordshire	895	Great Northern
Bowes Park	A cast iron footbridge with an upwards gradient. There are regular spans overhead connecting the two sides; the nearest one has a sign that reads "Welcome to Bowes Park"		‡ Hertford Loop line; Piccadilly line (LU) (Note: Out of station interchange (OSI) with Bounds Green tube station)	2	1 November 1880	London Borough of Haringey	525	Great Northern
Brookmans Park	A red-brick building seen from a slightly higher elevation. There is an open space to walk through with a canopy above it. On the canopy there is a sign that reads "Brookmans Park". Both sides of the path are flanked by trees		‡ East Coast Main Line	4	19 July 1926	Welwyn Hatfield	275	Great Northern
Cambridge	A grand two-story yellow-brick building with the front windows spanning both stories and a flat roof. The building is viewed from a short distance away on a wide pedestrian path, with lampposts and bollards on it.	II	‡ Cambridge line; West Anglia Main Line; East West Rail (planned)	8	30 July 1845	Cambridge	11,200	Greater Anglia
Cambridge North	A large building with the facade made out of a metal mesh and large floor-to-ceiling windows on the ground floor. The photo is taken at night from behind a bench a short distance from the station.		‡ Fen line; Breckland line	3	21 May 2017	Cambridge	1,460	Greater Anglia
Cambridge South	A panoramic view of a construction site, with the only clearly built structure a large concrete cuboid and an arched wooden roof structure suspended in the air by steel trusses. Also visible on the site are cherry pickers, scaffolding towers, other work vehicles and the two railway tracks running through the station.		‡ Cambridge line; West Anglia Main Line; East West Rail (planned)	4	28 June 2026	Cambridge	—	Greater Anglia
Crews Hill	A blue portico archway is the entrance to a brick underpass with a brick wall on either side. There are metal fences on either side of the path. Above the archway a sign reads "Welcome to Crews Hill"		‡ Hertford Loop line	2	4 April 1910	London Borough of Enfield	119	Great Northern
Cuffley	A single-storey square yellow-brick building viewed from a 45 degree angle with windows on either side. The photo is taken from across the road with the platforms visible elevated behind the building.		‡ Hertford Loop line	2	4 April 1910	Welwyn Hatfield	663	Great Northern
Downham Market	The platform side of the station building as seen from the other platform. The building is a yellow-brick building with red roof tiles and a canopy hanging over the platform. One of the railway tracks and the overhead wires are also visible.	II	‡ Fen line	2	27 October 1846	King's Lynn and West Norfolk	441	Great Northern
Drayton Park	A red brick building with a flat canopy between the two stories. On the canopy is a sign that reads "DRAYTON PARK". To the right of the building there is a double arrow logo on a pole, and there is a postbox outside the station with a car parked either side.		‡ Northern City Line	2	14 February 1904	London Borough of Islington	729	Great Northern
Ely	A white stucco building with a mix of one and two stories with sash windows as seen from the pavement a short distance away. Above the entrance is a sign that reads "Welcome to Ely" and a man is standing in front of the station.		‡ Fen line; Breckland line; Hereward line	3 (facing 4 tracks)	30 July 1845	East Cambridgeshire	2,730	Greater Anglia
Enfield Chase (Note: The first Enfield railway station opened on 1 April 1871. When the Great Northern Railway extended the Hertford Loop line, they closed the station and built a new station—also called Enfield—on a different site. That station opened on 4 April 1910.)	A two-story thin red-brick building with a flat roof. The first floor has a doorway with a canopy above; the second floor has five windows; above the second floor is a large sign that reads "Welcome to Enfield Chase".		‡ Hertford Loop line	2	4 April 1910	London Borough of Enfield	1,170	Great Northern
Essex Road	A large red-brick building with black window frames as seen from across the road with two trees in front. A sign on top of the doorway reads "Essex Road station"		‡ Northern City Line	2	14 February 1904	London Borough of Islington	698	Great Northern
Finsbury Park	A large modern building with a massive canopy extending upwards from the top and over the bus station, which is supported by large V shaped pillars. An underground roundel is visible behind one of the windows and two buses are parked in the station.		‡ East Coast Main Line; ‡ Northern City Line; Victoria line (LU); Piccadilly line (LU)	8 (facing 6 tracks)	1 July 1861	London Borough of Islington	13,400	Great Northern
Foxton	A small single-story yellow brick building. The photograph shows the platform side from the other building. One of the tracks below the platform, the overhead wires, and a signal are also visible in the photo.		‡ Cambridge line	2	24 February 1858	South Cambridgeshire	99.0	Great Northern
Gordon Hill	A single-story red brick building as viewed from across the street. The view of the building is blocked by many cars parked in front and a sign at the entrance to the car park. Behind the sign is a pole, at the top of which there is a double arrow sign with "Gordon Hill" written beneath it.		‡ Hertford Loop line	3	4 April 1910	London Borough of Enfield	1,150	Great Northern
Grange Park	A single storey red-brick building as photographed from the road. It has a large blue door which is closed, and instead the entrance is through a gate to the right. In front of the building is a bus stop and a double arrow on a pole with a sign underneath that reads "Grange Park".		‡ Hertford Loop line	2	4 April 1910	London Borough of Enfield	493	Great Northern
Hadley Wood	A small cuboid brutalist plastic and glass building as viewed from across the street. In front of the building are a bin, ATM, ticket machine, and flower stall. Above the windows a sign reads "Hadley Wood".		‡ East Coast Main Line	4	1 May 1885	London Borough of Enfield	362	Great Northern
Harringay	A small cuboid wood panel building wihth a sign above the door that reads "Harringay". It has metal fences on either side with an entrance through a gate. There are signs on the building and fence pointing people to the trains.		‡ East Coast Main Line Suffragette line (LO) (Note: Out of station interchange (OSI) with Harringay Green Lanes)	2 (facing 6 tracks)	1 May 1885	London Borough of Haringey	1,140	Great Northern
Hatfield	A large single-storey red-brick building slightly above ground level with stairs leading up to it. In the centre is a large glass entrance, and on each side thee are windows with metal letters above that read "Hatfield station". The photo is taken from the pavement in front with lampposts obstructing the building slightly.		‡ East Coast Main Line	3 (facing 4 tracks)	7 August 1850	Welwyn Hatfield	2,460	Great Northern
Hertford North	A single-storey yellow-brick building with its entrance at one of the corners. The entrance is covered by a glass canopy with a sign that reads "Hertford North". There are cars, bikes and people in front.		‡ Hertford Loop line	3	1 March 1858	East Hertfordshire	1,030	Great Northern
Highbury & Islington	A trapezium-shaped brick wall with two entranceways on either side. Each entrance is shut by metal gates and have a sign above that reads "HIGHBURY & ISLINGTON STATION".		‡ Northern City Line; Victoria line (LU); Mildmay line (LO); Windrush line (LO)	2 National Rail platforms (numbered 4 and 6)	26 September 1850	London Borough of Islington	27,200	London Underground
Hitchin	A very long red-brick two-storey building with a slanted roof and chimneys as photographed from across the street. A large number of people block the view of the ground floor of the building.		‡ Cambridge line; ‡ East Coast Main Line	2 (facing 4 tracks)	7 August 1850	North Hertfordshire	3,110	Great Northern
Hornsey	A large yellow-brick building with a bus stop in front as photographed from across the street. Most of the original windows on the facade are bricked in and the doorway is also closed up. A sign appended to the side has a double arrow logo and illegible writing, and overhead line equipment is visible behind the building on the right hand side.		‡ East Coast Main Line	2 (facing 6 tracks)	7 August 1850	London Borough of Haringey	1,660	Great Northern
Huntingdon	A small yellow-brick single-storey building with a slanted roof and chimneys viewed from some distance away .The view of the building is mainly blocked by a large row of cars. To the left is a visible blue footbridge.	II	‡ East Coast Main Line	3 (facing 5 tracks)	7 August 1850	Huntingdonshire	1,570	Great Northern
King's Lynn	A cream-brick large single-storey building as viewed from across the street, with the view partially blocked by a lamppost and traffic light. In the centre of the building's slanted roof is a decorated glass section with a canopy extending over the door way. A sign on this canopy reads "King's Lynn".	II	‡ Fen line	2 (facing 4 tracks)	28 August 1871	King's Lynn and West Norfolk	854	Great Northern
Knebworth	A small red-brick station building as viewed from some distance away across a car park. The building has a closed black double door with a sign above reading "Knebworth", as well as a phone, post-box, and defibrillator. The railway lies behind the building, which is clearly not in use as a station building operationally.		‡ East Coast Main Line	4	1 February 1884	North Hertfordshire	437	Great Northern
Letchworth Garden City	A small red-brick station building as viewed from across the street. There is a entranceway with a canopy and dormer window above; on this canopy is a sign reading "Letchworth Garden City". On either side of the central section the canopy merges into a bay window. The station is fairly crowded in front with people and cars.	II	‡ Cambridge line	2	18 May 1913 (Note: Replacing an earlier, temporary station)	North Hertfordshire	1,780	Great Northern
Littleport	-A view of a two-track electrified railway from the right-hand platform. At the end of the platform there is a closed level crossing gate and a cream and green signal box. On the left-hand platform there is a small creeam and green shelter.		‡ Fen line	2	25 October 1847	East Cambridgeshire	252	Great Northern
London King's Cross (Note: The first southern terminus of the Great Northern Railway was a temporary station at Maiden Lane, which has also been referred to as King's Cross. Despite their similar locations, this is a separate station from the London King's Cross that opened in 1852.)	A panoramic view of a square; on the left hand side is an extremely grand facade made of two massive arches with a clock tower in the middle. An English flag flies from the left-hand pillar, with a Union Flag flying from the right hand pillar. Below in the square the floor is an striped tiled pattern with modern grey buildings on it. Various, mostly Victorian-looking buildings, are visible in the background as well as a crane behind the station building. The square is packed with people as is the road with cars.	I	From London King's Cross railway station: ‡ East Coast Main Line; From King's Cross St Pancras tube station (OSI): Circle line (LU); Hammersmith & City line (LU); Metropolitan line (LU); Northern line (LU); Piccadilly line (LU); Victoria line (LU); From St Pancras railway station (OSI): High Speed 1; Midland Main Line; Thameslink; From Euston railway station (OSI (Note: Out of station interchange with the National Rail station is permitted, but not with the London Underground station.)): Lioness line (LO); West Coast Main Line	11 National Rail platforms (numbered 0–10)	14 October 1854	London Borough of Camden	29,300 (Note: Does not include usage figures for King's Cross St Pancras tube station or St Pancras railway station)	Network Rail
Meldreth	A view overlooking a station as taken from the footbridge over it on the left-hand side. There are two platforms, one either side of two tracks. On the right-hand platform there is a yellow-brick station building that is a mix of one and two storeys. Overhead line equipment, signals, and lamppostts are also visible.		‡ Cambridge line	2	3 August 1852	South Cambridgeshire	246	Great Northern
Moorgate	A view of the ground floor of a much taller building as taken from across the street. The building is red-brick with orderly windows but the ground floor has been fronted in white stone with a sign that reads "MOORGATE STATION" above the entranceway, as well as a tiled one much higher above below the second-floor windows. Both an underground roundel and double arrow are displayed on a sign above the entrance.	II	From Moorgate station: ‡ Northern City Line; Circle line (LU); Hammersmith & City line (LU); Metropolitan line (LU); Northern line (LU); From Liverpool Street station (OSI): Elizabeth line; Great Eastern Main Line; Weaver line (LO); West Anglia Main Line	2 National Rail platforms (numbered 9 and 10)	23 September 1866 (Note: Various stations and sets of platforms have existed at Moorgate; 23 September 1863 is the date the first company—the Metropolitan Railway—began services. The Great Northern & City Railway, whose services would become part of the Great Northern route, arrived on 14 February 1904. Their platforms were connected to the other platforms at the station by escalator.)	City of London	9,170	London Underground
New Barnet	A small yellow-brick station building that is mostly covered by its slate-tile roof as viewed from across the street. The centre of the building is cut out to be a gateway but the door arch is closed by a gate. To the left there is a blue pole with a double arrow logo on top and a sign that reads "New Barnet".		‡ East Coast Main Line	4	7 August 1850	London Borough of Barnet	1,270	Great Northern
New Southgate	The entrance to a cast iron footbridge with a tall brick wall on either side, as photographed from across the road. There are cast iron spans overhead between the spans, and on the front one there is a sign that reads "New Southgate". On the left of the entrance there is a ticket machine and other posters.		‡ East Coast Main Line	4	7 August 1850	London Borough of Enfield	920	Great Northern
Oakleigh Park	a two-storey white-painted wood building with brick highlights. The building is designed such that the bottom storey is on a railway island platform, and the upper storey is on the footbridge above. Part of the footbridge, stairs up to it on the opposite side, overhead wires, and a lamppost are also visible.		‡ East Coast Main Line	4	1 December 1873	London Borough of Barnet	924	Great Northern
Old Street	A modern metal structure with a large open doorway and slanted roof. On the roof is grass and moss rather than roof tiles, and between the doorway and roof there is a sign that reads "OLD STREET STATION". Inside the building, massive metal spans in a pentagonal shape holding up the structure are visible.		‡ Northern City Line; Northern line (LU)	2 National Rail platforms (numbered 3 and 4)	17 November 1901	London Borough of Islington	6,080	London Underground
Palmers Green	A fairly large brick building with a tiled roof and chimneys as viewed from across the street. In the centre of the building there is a doorway with a sign above that says "Welcome to Palmers Green", as well as a shop on the left and ticket machines on the right, all of which are underneath a canopy structure.		‡ Hertford Loop line	2	1 April 1871	London Borough of Enfield	1,560	Great Northern
Peterborough	A modern glass building with a pink doorway, a sign on the top of which says "PETERBOROUGH STATION". On each side the glass becomes brick wall after a few windows. A very large flat metal canopy sits above the entranceway; a parallelogram intersects this canopy perpendicular to the entranceway, with "PETERBOROUGH" below the canopy and a double arrow above.		‡ East Coast Main Line; Birmingham–Peterborough line; Hereward Line; Peterborough–Lincoln line	7 (facing 9 tracks)	7 August 1850	City of Peterborough	6,260	London North Eastern Railway
Potters Bar	A four-storey modern yellow-brick building with many large blue windows on the facade. In the left hand corner, some of the building is cut out with a pillar supporting the structure and a glass structure inside. In the centre on the bottom floor is two entranceways, the left of which has a sign that reads "Potters Bar" above. There are also vertical signs that read "Potters Bar" in between the windows on each side of the entranceway.		‡ East Coast Main Line	4	7 August 1850	Hertsmere	2,540	Great Northern
Royston	An unusually-shaped yellow-brick building as photographed from slightly higher ground across the road. There is a doorway below a canopy with a sign on it that reads "Royston".		‡ Cambridge line	2	21 October 1850	North Hertfordshire	1,330	Great Northern
Sandy	A large two-storey yellow-brick building as photographed from a short distance away. Cars parked in front block the view of the building, and all of the windows are boarded up. In the background lamp posts and overhead gantries on the platforms are visible.		‡ East Coast Main Line	2 (facing 4 tracks)	7 August 1850	Central Bedfordshire	679	Great Northern
Shepreth	A large yellow-brick building that is a mix of one and two storeys.The building has one side on a railway platform and the other on the street, and the photo is taken from a level crossing looking at the building and platform above.		‡ Cambridge line	2	3 August 1851	South Cambridgeshire	110	Great Northern
Stevenage (Note: The first railway station named Stevenage opened on 7 August 1850 on the original stretch of the Great Northern Railway between London and Peterborough. In 1973, it was replaced with another station of the same name 1 mi (1.6 km) south on the line.)	a view from a railway island platform, looking at the footbridge at the station. There is a train stopped on the right-hand side of the island platform, and overhead line equipment visible above the two visible tracks. The footbridge is made of four pillar shafts with tubular sections in between.		‡ East Coast Main Line; ‡ Hertford Loop line	5	23 July 1973	Stevenage	5,870	Great Northern
St Neots	A small yellow-brick building as photographed from a short distance away. The building has a small canopy and a slanted roof with bollards in front and a pos-tbox in the side of the wall. Overhead wires and gantries are visible in the background.		‡ East Coast Main Line	4	7 August 1850	Huntingdonshire	1,080	Great Northern
Waterbeach	A view of a railway platform on the left-hand side of two tracks as seen from a parallel path slightly lower. On the platform there are red lampposts and a sign that reads "WATERBEACH". There are many overhead gantry structures and wire fencing obstructing the view of the tracks on the left-hand side.		‡ Fen line; Breckland line	3	30 July 1845	South Cambridgeshire	372	Great Northern
Watlington	A photo taken from a railway platform to the left of two tracks. There is no platform to the right and a sign on the platform reads "Watlington". Overhead gantries are visible above the line and a train is visible in the background on the left-hand track. There is a level crossing and signal box before the right-hand platform in the distance behind that.		‡ Fen line	2	27 October 1846	King's Lynn and West Norfolk	134	Great Northern
Watton-at-Stone	A tiny brick building with a shuttered over window and a closed blue door. A path passes to the left and to the left of that there is a pole with a double arrow sign, an IntaLink logo, and a sign that reads "Watton-at-Stone". A sign above above the window and door on the building also reads "Watton-at-Stone".		‡ Hertford Loop line	2	18 October 1869	East Hertfordshire	168	Great Northern
Welham Green	A tiny brick structure with stairs and a ramp leading up to it. A canopy covers the path in front of the building, with a sign on the canopy that reads "Welham Green". In the left-hand background overhead wires are visible behind a fence.		‡ East Coast Main Line	4	29 September 1986	Welwyn Hatfield	253	Great Northern
Welwyn Garden City	A view of a railway island platform with overhead wires above the tracks from the footbridge to the left hand side. On the side of the stairs to the platform down the footbridge is a sign that reads "Welwyn Garden City", and there is also a brick platform building with a large canopy extending over the platform.		‡ East Coast Main Line	4 (facing 6 tracks)	20 September 1926 (Note: A temporary halt had operated since 1 September 1920.)	Welwyn Hatfield	2,520	Great Northern
Welwyn North	A two-storey red-brick building as viewed from quite far away across a road. Almost all of the windows are bricked in, and above the entranceway between the two floors is a sign that reads "WELWYN NORTH". Overhead gantries are also visible in the background, as is a double arrow on a pole to the right of the entrance to the station car park.	II	‡ East Coast Main Line	2	7 August 1850	Welwyn Hatfield	387	Great Northern
Winchmore Hill	A brick building with an open entranceway below a canopy. On the right-hand side of the building there is a double arrow sign with "Winchmore Hill" written below. To the right of the entranceway there are ticket machines, newspaper stands, and a defibrillator.		‡ Hertford Loop line	2	1 April 1871	London Borough of Enfield	1,410	Great Northern

=== Future stations ===
There is one station that has been confirmed to have funding allocated to it, Tempsford, which was guaranteed in January 2025 to serve both the East Coast Main Line and East West Rail by Rachel Reeves, the Chancellor of the Exchequer. Interest by local and campaign groups in opening new stations and reopening old stations is common; examples include in Harston and Offord. However, the Campaign for Better Transport does not include any projects related to the Great Northern route in its suggestions.

‡ Constituent line of the Great Northern route

Future Great Northern route stations
Station	Station building	Number of platforms	Line(s)	Local authority	Expected opening
Tempsford		Unknown	‡ East Coast Main Line East West Rail (later)	Central Bedfordshire	Unknown; five years before EWR to Cambridge.

=== Former stations ===
There are nineteen stations on the route which have been closed to passengers, even though the line that they were once on remains open today. Of these, three were closed at the same time a replacement opened (Enfield, Maiden Lane, Stevenage) and two were replaced at a later date (Chesterton and Trumpington). One station, Tempsford, has funding to be replaced in the future.

Trumpington station was the shortest-lived station on the route, closing permanently on 8 July 1922 only four days after it originally opened. Stevenage was the longest-lasting at 122 years and 11 months, but if excluding stations that have since been replaced, the longest-lasting is Harston at 111 years and 2 months. Eight of the former stations were closed during the 1950s and 1960s (at the height of the British Rail Modernisation Plan and Beeching cuts).

‡ Constituent line of the Great Northern route

Closed Great Northern route stations
Station	Photograph	Line(s)	Opened	Closed	Tenure	Replaced by	Local authority (Note: Local authorities are based on the modern day jurisdiction of the station site. This may not be representative of the station's local authority at any point when it was open.)
Abbots Ripton		‡ East Coast Main Line	1 November 1885	15 September 1958	72 years, 10 months	—	Huntingdonshire
Chesterton		‡ Fen line Cambridge and St Ives branch line	17 August 1847	October 1850	3 years, 1 month	Cambridge North (166 years later)	Cambridge
Denver	A photograph taken from a level crossing above a single railway track. To the left is a Tudor revival brick building with a slate roof, and the shape of a platform next to the railway but with no surface.	‡ Fen line	January 1847	22 September 1930	83 years, 8 months	—	King's Lynn and West Norfolk
Enfield	A black and white photo of a grand brick building as viewed from a short distance away with people and a horse and cart in front. A sign on the building says "GREAT NORTHERN RAILWAY".	‡ Hertford Loop line	1 April 1871	4 April 1910	39 years	Enfield Chase (immediately)	London Borough of Enfield
Harston		‡ Cambridge line	1 April 1852	17 June 1963	111 years, 2 months	—	South Cambridgeshire
Hilgay		‡ Fen line	25 October 1847	4 November 1963	116 years	—	King's Lynn and West Norfolk
Holloway and Caledonian Road	A map of a station from above. The station comprises six parallel tracks with an island platform in the middle, and a massive goods depot to the left. The word "HOLLOWAY" is written across the map, and the line is labelled as the Great Northern Railway	‡ East Coast Main Line	14 October 1852	1 October 1915	62 years, 11 months	—	London Borough of Islington
Holme (GER)		‡ Fen line	Before November 1847	March 1853	At least 5 years, 4 months	—	King's Lynn and West Norfolk
Holme (GNR)		‡ East Coast Main Line	7 August 1850	6 April 1959	108 years, 7 months	—	Huntingdonshire
Maiden Lane	An artist's impression of the inside of a train station crowded with people underneath a long roof. One group of these is obviously identifiable as Queen Victoria, Prince Albert, and one of their chlidren. Two men bow their heads opposite them.	‡ East Coast Main Line	7 August 1850	14 October 1852	2 years, 2 months	London King's Cross (immediately)	London Borough of Camden
Offord and Buckden	A steam train photographed in black and white at speed from a person by the tracks, clearly lower down. The train is long and the locomotive is clearly producing a great deal of smoke. To its right in the background is a medieval church. To its left in the foreground is a semaphore signal mounted on a gantry.	‡ East Coast Main Line	September 1851	2 February 1959	107 years, 5 months	—	Huntingdonshire
Ouse Bridge		‡ Fen line	25 October 1847	1 January 1864	16 years, 2 months	—	King's Lynn and West Norfolk
Stevenage	A black and white photograph of a railway station as taken from a short distance away. The station has two island platforms with an additional track passing to the left-hand side. There are buildings on the platforms and a footbridge in the background. Two signs on the platforms say "STEVENAGE", and in the bottom left-hand corner the photograph is captioned "THE STATION. STEVENAGE".	‡ East Coast Main Line ‡ Hertford Loop line	7 August 1850	23 July 1973	122 years, 11 months	Stevenage (immediately)	Stevenage
St Germain's		‡ Fen line	27 October 1846	October 1850	4 years	—	King's Lynn and West Norfolk
Stow Bardolph	A small brick building with ornate windows situated to the right of two railway tracks. There is a level crossing barrier across the tracks, cars in front of the house, and overhead gantries above the track. There is no other visible evidence of a former station. The ground is snowy and the photo has a sepia tone.	‡ Fen line	27 October 1846	4 November 1963	117 years	—	King's Lynn and West Norfolk
Tempsford		‡ East Coast Main Line	1 January 1863	5 November 1956	93 years, 10 months	— (Note: Will be replaced by a new station in the future (see § Future stations))	Central Bedfordshire
Three Counties	A station with two island platforms and four tracks as photographed in black and white from higher ground a short distance away. A telegraph pole obstructs the camera's view, and a sign on the platform says "THREE COUNTIES". There are also platform buildings and people standing on the right-hand platform.	‡ East Coast Main Line	1 April 1866	5 January 1959	92 years, 9 months	—	North Hertfordshire
Trumpington	A black and white photo of a railway station from higher ground above the tracks a short distance away. There are four tracks with a platform either side; the right-hand platform is an island platform with a goods yard to the right. A train sits on the rightmost platform, which has many people on it.	‡ Cambridge line West Anglia Main Line	4 July 1922	8 July 1922	4 days	Cambridge South (104 years later)	Cambridge
Yaxley and Farcet	A black and white photo of two railway tracks with a platform either side. On the right-hand track is a locomotive producing steam. Each platform has shrubberies and a platform building, and on the left-hand platform there is a cut-off sign that reads "LEY & FARCET".	‡ East Coast Main Line	19 May 1890	6 April 1959	68 years, 10 months	—	Huntingdonshire
