= Theobalds Brook =

Stream in Hertfordshire, England

Coordinates: 51.69308°N 0.0551°W

Course of the Theobalds Brook

Theobalds Brook is a minor tributary of the River Lea which rises in the hills south of Goffs Oak in Hertfordshire, England.
