= Hertford Loop line =

Branch of the East Coast Main Line

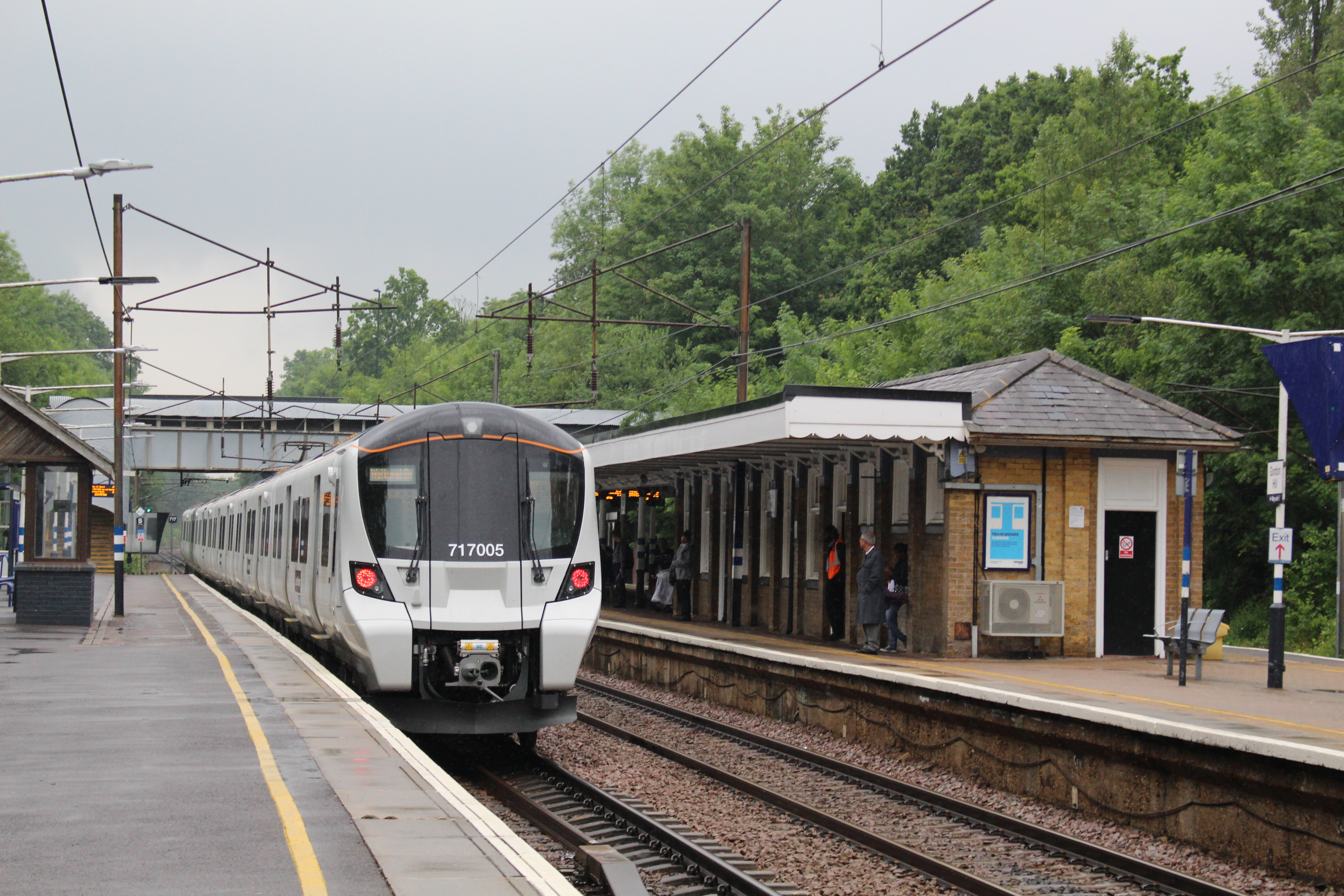
- Great Northern Class 717 at Gordon Hill

Overview
- Status: Operational
- Owner: Network Rail
- Locale: Greater London; East of England
- Termini: Moorgate; Stevenage
- Stations: 11

Service
- Type: Heavy rail
- System: National Rail
- Services: 1
- Operator: Great Northern (Greater Thameslink Railway)
- Depot: Hornsey EMUD
- Rolling stock: Class 717 "Desiro City"

History
- Opened: 1871—1924

Technical
- Line length: 24 mi (39 km)
- Number of tracks: 2
- Track gauge: 1,435 mm (4 ft 8 1/2 in) standard gauge
- Loading gauge: W9
- Route availability: RA 7-9
- Electrification: 25 kV AC OHLE
- Operating speed: Maximum 75 mph (121 km/h)
Route map
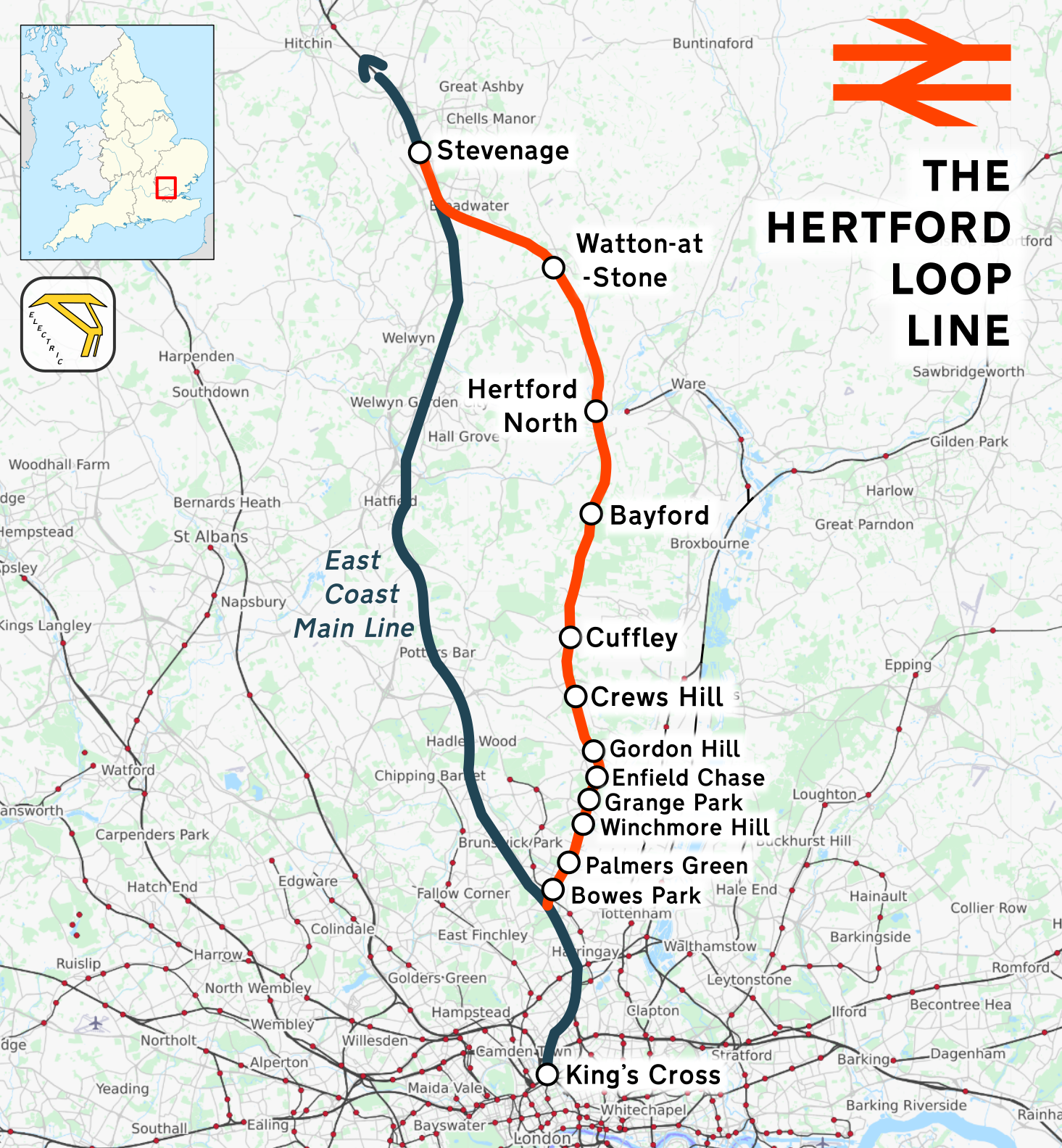
(Click to expand)

The Hertford Loop line (also known colloquially as the Hertford Loop) is a branch of the East Coast Main Line, part of the Northern City Line commuter route to London for Hertford and other Hertfordshire towns and an occasional diversion route for the main line. The line is part of the Network Rail Strategic Route 8, SRS 08.03 and is classified as a London and South East Commuter line.

== History ==
The line was opened in three stages between 1871 and 1924. The first section called the Enfield Branch Railway was developed by the London and York Railway and went from Wood Green to Enfield. In 1898, a plan was approved to extend the line north to Hertford and Stevenage, in order to relieve congestion on the main line without having to widen the Digswell Viaduct. Work started in 1905 and Cuffley was reached on 4 April 1910. The construction of two major viaducts and the Ponsbourne Tunnel (at 2,684 yards or 2,454 metres, the longest in the eastern counties of England, the longest on the Great Northern Railway, and the last to be built by traditional methods), combined with World War I shortages of men and materials, delayed the opening of the route to Stevenage until 4 March 1918. Then it was single track and for goods services only. The line finally opened to passengers on 2 June 1924 when a new station at Hertford North was opened. The line was electrified in 1977.

The cost of extending the Hertford Loop line to Stevenage was £1.25 million, equivalent to £144,000,000 in 2025. The alternative, quadrupling the bottlenecks at Potters Bar and Welwyn, would have been cheaper, but did not come with the increased passenger numbers that the Hertford Loop line would bring.

The line was also used frequently during the Second World War as the Digswell Viaduct was at high risk from bombs.

== Route and settlements served ==
The Hertford Loop line leaves the East Coast Main Line at Wood Green South Junction, north of Alexandra Palace. It then serves:

- Bowes Park, serving Bowes Park, Bounds Green and Wood Green
- Palmers Green, serving Palmers Green
- Winchmore Hill, serving Winchmore Hill
- Grange Park, serving Grange Park
- Enfield Chase, serving Enfield Town
- Gordon Hill, serving Gordon Hill and Forty Hill, also close to Chase Farm Hospital.
- Crews Hill, serving the village of Crews Hill
- Cuffley, serving the villages of Cuffley, Northaw and Goffs Oak
- Bayford, serving the villages of Bayford and Brickendon
- Hertford North, serving the town of Hertford
- Watton-at-Stone, serving the village of Watton-at-Stone

The line then rejoins the East Coast Main Line at Langley Junction, just south of Stevenage.

== Services ==
Great Northern (part of Greater Thameslink Railway) operates suburban services along the Hertford Loop line between London King's Cross or Moorgate, and Stevenage, Watton-at-Stone or Hertford North. There are also bay platforms at Hertford North, Stevenage, and Gordon Hill, the latter acting as a terminus during peak hours and night only.

Occasionally, London North Eastern Railway, Hull Trains, Grand Central, Lumo, Thameslink and other faster Great Northern services operate non-stop along the route when diverted off the main section of the East Coast Main Line, due to incidents or planned engineering work. There is a reversing siding to the north of Bowes Park which is used to reverse London North Eastern Railway trains heading for Bounds Green Depot.

== Infrastructure ==
The line is about 24 miles (39 km) long, is double track throughout and is electrified at 25 kV AC using overhead line equipment. It has a loading gauge of W9 and a maximum line speed of 75 mph (121 km/h).

Grade-separated junctions connect each end of the northbound track with the main line. All stations are long enough to accept two three-car (20m) EMUs. Not all stations are long enough for newly introduced 6-car EMUs, but their walk-through design allows for access.

=== Tunnels and viaducts ===
Major civil engineering structures on the Hertford Loop line include the following.

Tunnels and viaducts on the Hertford Loop line
Railway Structure	Length	Distance from London King's Cross	Location
Molewood Tunnel	364 yards (333 metres)	20 miles 31 chains – 20 miles 14 chains	North of Hertford North station
Hertford Viaduct	14 chains	19 miles 15 chains – 19 miles 01 chains	Between Hertford North and Bayford stations
Hornsmill Viaduct (River Lea)	6 chains	18 miles 58 chains – 18 miles 52 chains	Between Hertford North and Bayford stations
Ponsbourne Tunnel	1 mile 924 yards (2454 metres)	16 miles 21 chains – 14 miles 59 chains	Between Bayford and Cuffley stations
Sopers Farm Viaduct	6 chains	12 miles 43 chains – 12 miles 37 chains	Between Cuffley and Crews Hill stations
Rendlesham Viaduct	7 chains	10 miles 40 chains – 10 miles 33 chains	Between Crews Hill and Gordon Hill stations
Down Enfield Viaduct (Down line)		5 miles 22 chains	North of Alexandra Palace station

== ERTMS trials on the Hertford Loop line ==
Network Rail used Beacon Rail owned Class 313 unit 313121 as a test vehicle for ERTMS on the Hertford Loop line. The plan involved resignalling a 5 1/2-mile (8.9 km) section of the double track route to allow existing passenger and freight services to work bi-directionally over the up Hertford Loop line, freeing the down line for ERTMS tests and evaluation.

== Future ==
=== Takeover by TfL ===
On 20 September 2025, Transport for London (TfL) submitted an outline business case to take over Great Northern services from Moorgate to Welwyn Garden City, Hertford North, and Stevenage and integrate it into the London Overground network. TfL wants to increase the number of trains from two trains per hour to four trains per hour, standardise fares across the route, serve a 21,000 home development at Crews Hill, and boost growth in North London and Hertfordshire. The takeover could occur in Autumn 2027, after Govia Thameslink Railway's franchise ends, if approval is given by DfT; however, the Overground services would use the existing Class 717 stock.
