= Crews Hill railway station =

National Rail station in London, England

Crews Hill
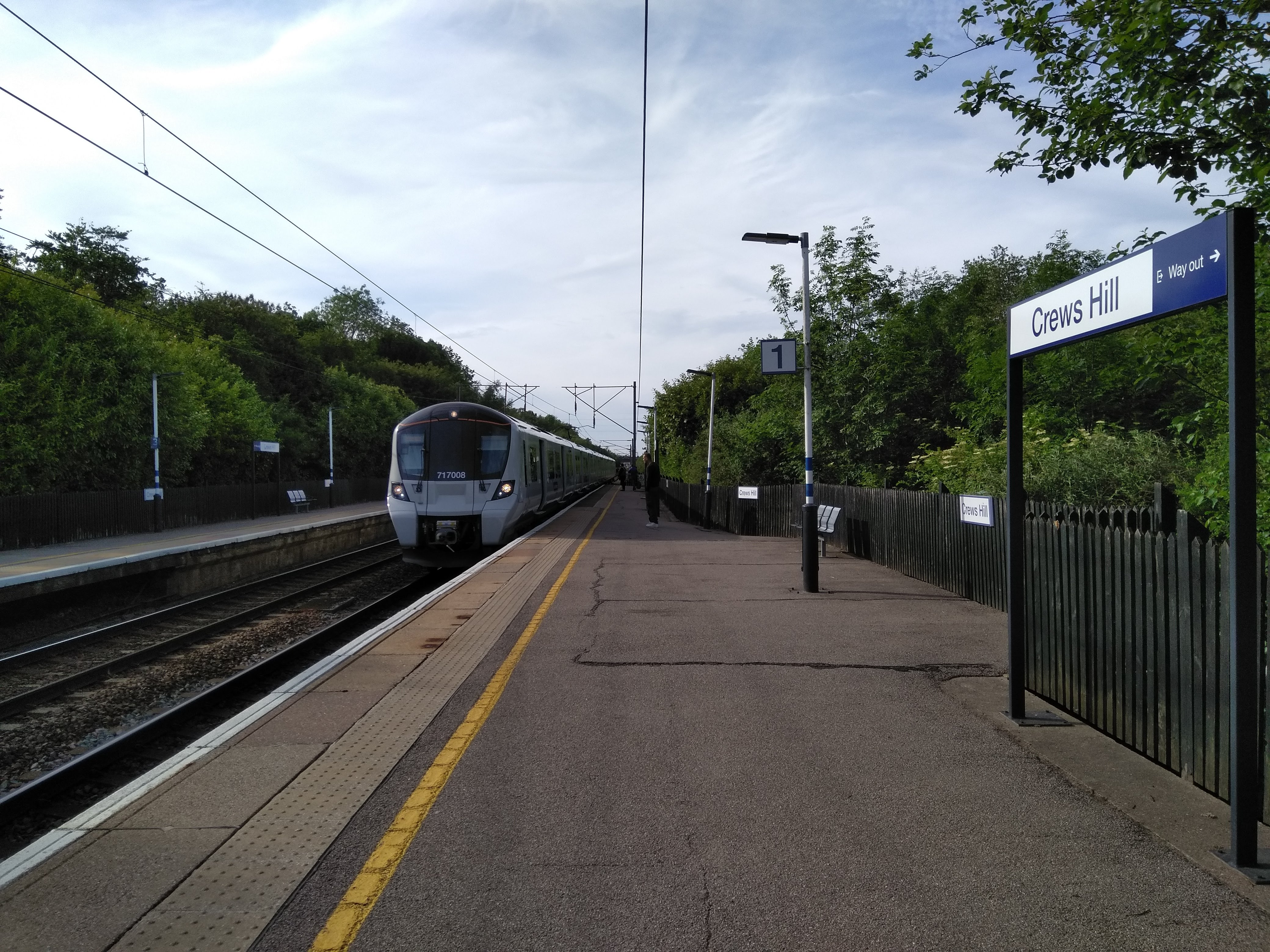
- Crews Hill Station
- Interactive map of Crews Hill

General information
- Location: Crews Hill
- Local authority: London Borough of Enfield
- Managed by: Great Northern
- Station code: CWH
- DfT category: F2
- Number of platforms: 2
- Fare zone: 6

National Rail annual entry and exit
- 2020–21: ▼45,210
- 2021–22: ▲88,944
- 2022–23: ▲0.104 million
- 2023–24: ▲0.113 million
- 2024–25: ▲0.119 million

Railway companies
- Original company: Great Northern Railway
- Pre-grouping: Great Northern Railway
- Post-grouping: London and North Eastern Railway

Key dates
- 4 April 1910: Station opened

Other information
- External links: Departures; Facilities
- Coordinates: 51.6845°N 0.1072°W

Crews Hill railway station serves Crews Hill in the London Borough of Enfield, north London. It is 11 miles 40 chains (11.50 miles, 18.51 km) down the line from London King's Cross on the Hertford Loop Line, in London fare zone 6. The station, and all trains serving it, are operated by Great Northern. The station was opened on 4 April 1910. It is the most northerly railway station in London.

== Geography ==
The station is on an access road just off Cattlegate Road. A subway links the down (northbound) platform with the entrance on the up (southbound) side.

== Services ==
All services at Crews Hill are operated by Great Northern using Class 717 EMUs.

The typical off-peak service in trains per hour is:

- 2 tph to Moorgate
- 2 tph to Stevenage via Hertford North

Additional services call at the station during the peak hours.

| Preceding station | National Rail | Following station |
|---|---|---|
| Gordon Hill | Great Northern Hertford Loop Line | Cuffley |
