= Cuffley =

Village in Hertfordshire, England

Coordinates: 51.7109°N 0.1134°W

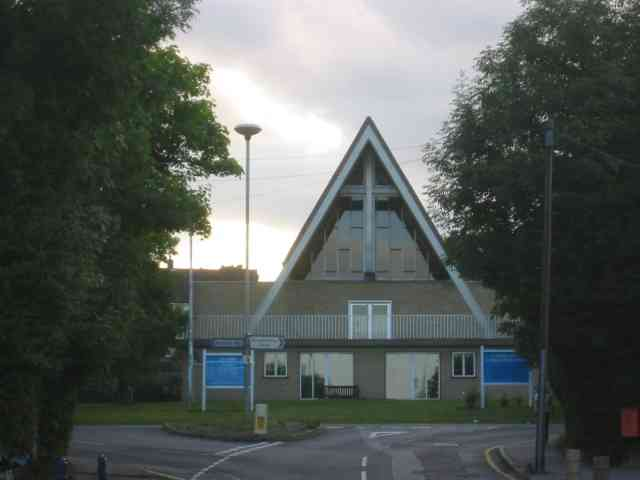
- Church of St Andrew, Cuffley

- Location within Hertfordshire
- Population: 4,295
- OS grid reference: TL305035
- Civil parish: Northaw and Cuffley
- District: Welwyn Hatfield
- Shire county: Hertfordshire
- Region: East
- Country: England
- Sovereign state: United Kingdom
- Post town: POTTERS BAR
- Postcode district: EN6
- Dialling code: 01707
- Police: Hertfordshire
- Fire: Hertfordshire
- Ambulance: East of England
- UK Parliament: Hertsmere

Cuffley is a village in the civil parish of Northaw and Cuffley, in the Welwyn Hatfield district of south-east Hertfordshire located between Cheshunt and Potters Bar. It has a population of just over 4,000 people. It is part of Hertsmere parliamentary constituency since the boundary review in 2023. It used to be a part of Broxbourne parliamentary constituency.

== History ==
Originally part of the parish of Northaw, the manor of Cuffley was recorded in the 13-century as Coffele. During the reign of Charles II of England in the 17th-century, the King's Well at Cuffley was renowned as spa and was frequented by wealthy people who were accommodated in a large tent supplied by the king. At the start of the 20th-century, Cuffley was still a small hamlet, consisting of just a few cottages and a room that served as both a school and a church.

The railway had an important impact on the development of the village. Cuffley was reached by the Great Northern Railway in 1910, as part of the plan to create the Hertford Loop Line, as a strategic alternative to the main line out of King's Cross to the north, by extending the line from Enfield Chase.

The early history of Cuffley is recounted by one of its residents, Molly Hughes, in her autobiographical book A London Family Between the Wars.

On 3 September 1916 the German airship SL 11 was shot down and crashed in Cuffley during an aerial bombardment intended for London. This incident is commemorated by a memorial on East Ridgeway to Lieutenant W. Leefe Robinson, the pilot who shot the airship down; he was awarded the Victoria Cross. There is also a model of the airship in the village hall. Contrary to many reports of the incident, the SL 11 airship was not a Zeppelin but an army Schütte-Lanz airship. Regardless, the local football team is still nicknamed 'The Zeps' after this event.

In 1939, the Scout Association purchased part of the Tolmers Park Estate that lies within the Parish of Cuffley. Tolmers Scout Camp was opened on Whit Saturday 1940 by Lord Wigram. Today, Tolmers hosts thousands of young people annually from all over the UK and across Europe; not only Scouts and Guides but schools and youth groups as well.

== Transport ==
Cuffley is near the M25 motorway and is part of the London commuter belt. Cuffley railway station provides a commuter service to Moorgate, Finsbury Park and King's Cross, services operated by Great Northern.

== Facilities ==
=== Schools ===
Cuffley Primary School has occupied its present building since 1938 when it replaced the original Victorian school room.

Preschool education for children aged 2 to 5 years old is available at the youth centre (Cuffley Community Centre Pre-School).

=== Churches ===
St Andrew's Church of England parish church was built in 1965 on the site of the old school room facing the top of Station Road, replacing the "tin church" built in 1911 on Plough Hill opposite the village green. The present church was designed by Clifford Culpin and Partners and has a steep roof supported on A-shaped concrete beams. Inside there is a metal sculpture by Angela Connor and coloured glass by Alfred Fisher.

Cuffley Free Church was built in 1965–67 to the design of Cyril J. Greening. In May 2011 it changed its name to The Life Church and is affiliated to the Central Baptist Association.

A Roman Catholic church dedicated to St Martin de Porres was built in 1963 in Church Close, and is a simple wooden building designed by Westmore and Partners.

== Notable people ==
Its most notable recent resident is Sir Terry Leahy, former CEO of Tesco, although this did not prevent locals from objecting vehemently to plans to build an "Express" store in the village replacing one of only two remaining village pubs. Other famous residents include Premier League footballers Ledley King, Jermain Defoe, Niko Kranjcar, David Bentley, Kyle Walker and Armand Traoré; and also former Sugababes singer Keisha Buchanan and Myleene Klass. Paul Atkinson (1946–2004), pop guitarist in The Zombies
