= Gordon Hill railway station =

National Rail station in London, England

Gordon Hill
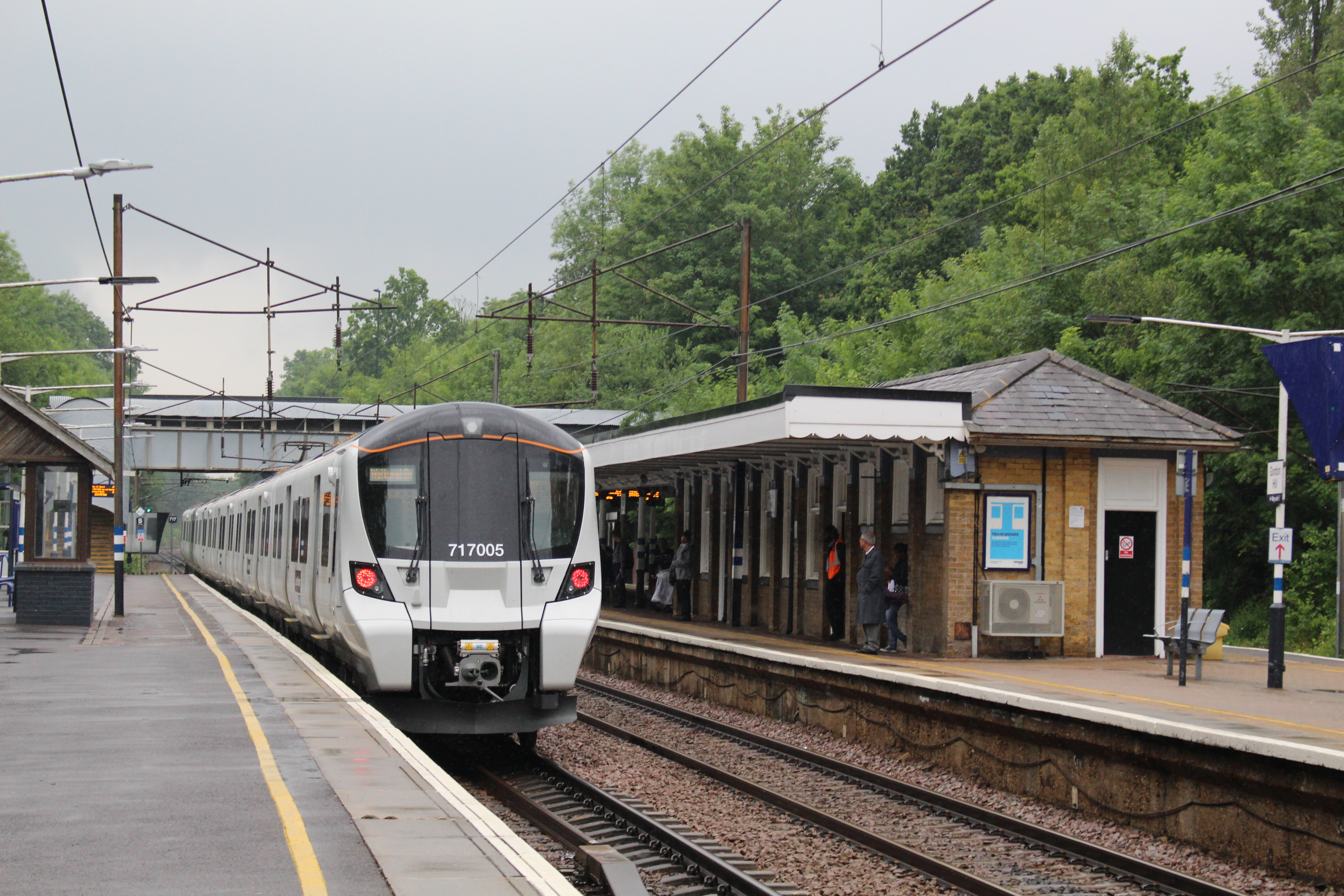
- Interactive map of Gordon Hill

General information
- Location: Gordon Hill
- Local authority: London Borough of Enfield
- Managed by: Great Northern
- Station code: GDH
- DfT category: D
- Number of platforms: 3
- Fare zone: 5

National Rail annual entry and exit
- 2020–21: ▼0.364 million
- 2021–22: ▲0.713 million
- 2022–23: ▲0.992 million
- 2023–24: ▲1.036 million
- 2024–25: ▲1.153 million

Other information
- External links: Departures; Facilities
- Coordinates: 51.6632°N 0.0943°W

Gordon Hill railway station serves Gordon Hill in the London Borough of Enfield, north London. It is 9 miles 69 chains (9.86 miles, 15.87 km) down the line from London King's Cross on the Hertford Loop Line, in London fare zone 5. It was opened on 4 April 1910. The station and the trains serving it are currently operated by Great Northern.

Three platforms are currently in use: Hertford-bound trains stop at platform 3 and London-bound trains stop at platform 2; platform 1 is a terminus platform used by certain trains to and from London, mainly during peak hours. A fourth platform face (opposite platform 3) is now disused - this was once used by North London Railway services to/from Broad Street.

In autumn 2008, a new Shere FASTticket self-service ticket machine, accepting both cash and debit/credit cards was installed.

== Services ==
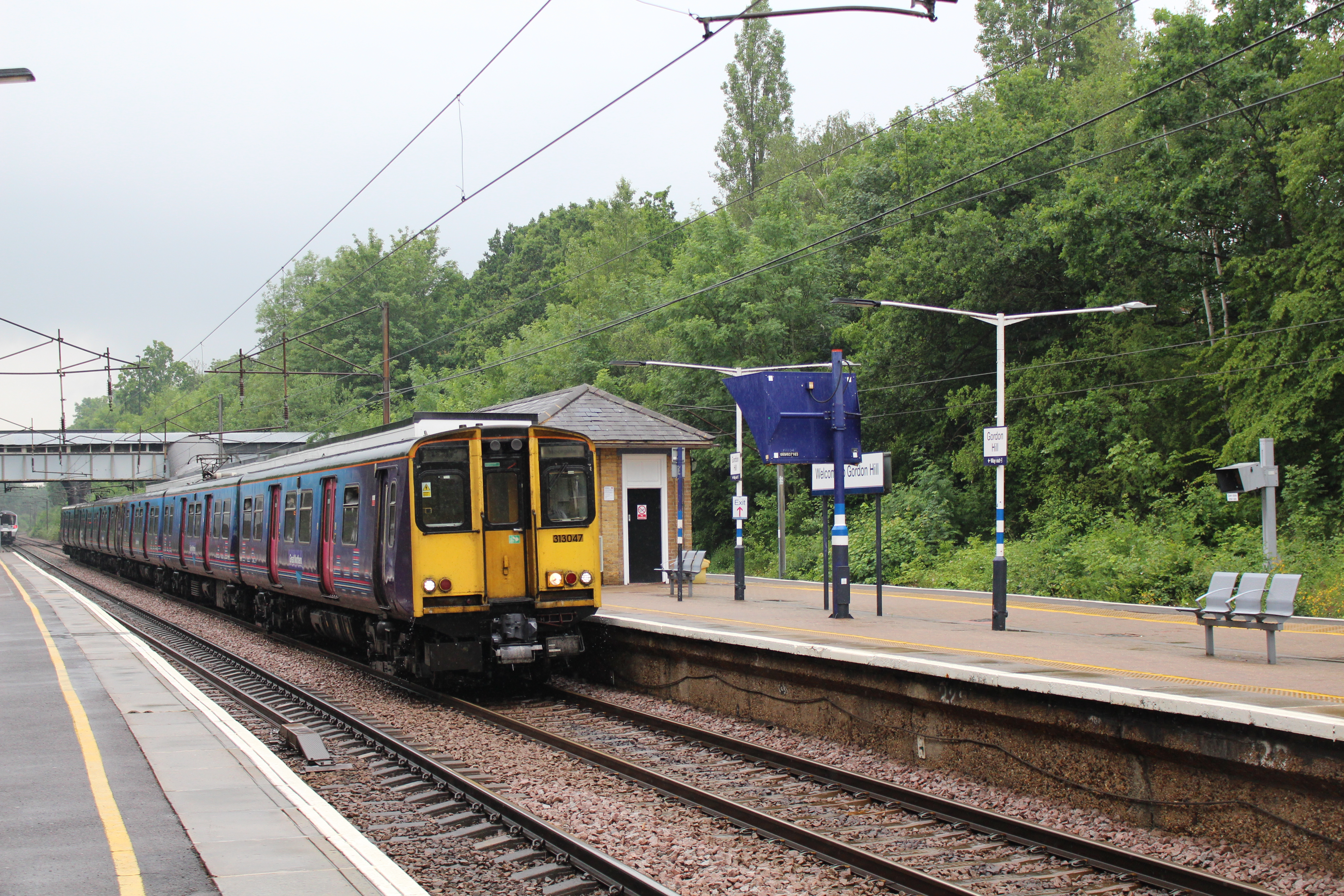
Great Northern Class 313 at Gordon Hill June 2019

All services at Gordon Hill are operated by Great Northern using Class 717 EMUs.

The typical off-peak service in trains per hour is:

- 2 tph to Moorgate
- 2 tph to Stevenage via Hertford North

Additional services serve the station during weekday peak hours, including some that originate/terminate here using platform 1.

Preceding station	National Rail	Following station
Enfield Chase	Great Northern Hertford Loop Line	Crews Hill

== Oyster ==
- Oyster Pay As You Go, introduced at this station on 2 January 2010, allows customers to make use of the Oyster card readers at the station.

== Connections ==
London Buses route W8 serves the station.
