= Enfield Chase railway station =

National Rail station in London, England

Enfield Chase
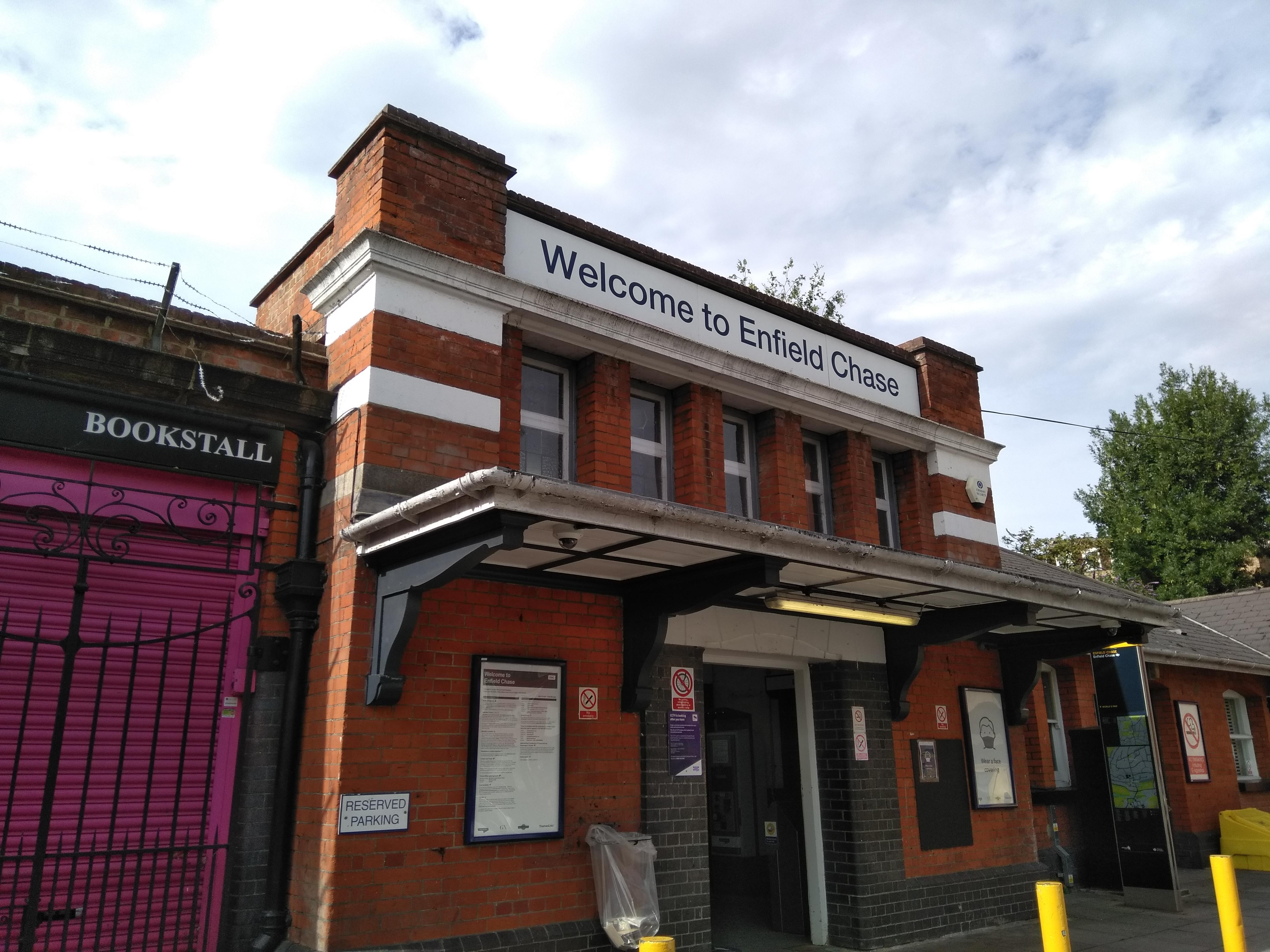
- Interactive map of Enfield Chase

General information
- Location: Enfield Town
- Local authority: London Borough of Enfield
- Managed by: Great Northern
- Station code: ENC
- DfT category: D
- Number of platforms: 2
- Fare zone: 5

National Rail annual entry and exit
- 2020–21: ▼0.352 million
- Interchange: ▼1,970
- 2021–22: ▲0.710 million
- Interchange: ▲4,573
- 2022–23: ▲0.997 million
- Interchange: ▼2,673
- 2023–24: ▲1.016 million
- Interchange: ▲3,117
- 2024–25: ▲1.166 million
- Interchange: ▼1,254

Key dates
- 4 April 1910: Opened

Other information
- External links: Departures; Facilities
- Coordinates: 51.6529°N 0.0908°W

Enfield Chase railway station is located in Windmill Hill, Enfield, in the London Borough of Enfield, north London, 9 miles 9 chains (9.11 miles, 14.67 km) from London King's Cross on the Hertford Loop Line. It is in London fare zone 5.

== History ==
=== The original terminus ===
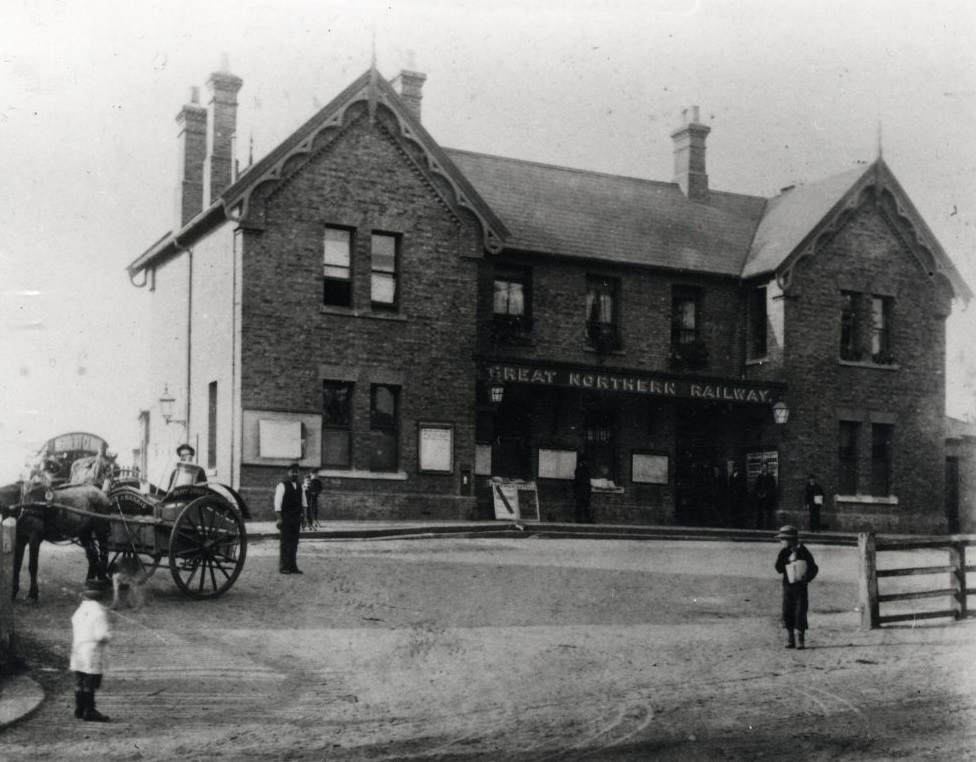
The original Great Northern Railway terminus station at Windmill Hill, Enfield, in 1898 (Enfield Local Studies Library and Archive)

The original Enfield Station in Windmill Hill opened on 1 April 1871 as the terminus for the Great Northern Railway branch line from Alexandra Palace. By 1887, 37 trains a day left Enfield, mainly for King's Cross, but also to Broad Street and until 1907, to Woolwich and Victoria. The station building was a two-storey twin-gabled house, similar in style to the single-storey building at Palmers Green. It was sited lengthways across the end of the track. The single island platform was covered by a wide canopy for much of its length. Enfield Station had been intended to bring prosperous middle-class commuters to the area. A journalist visiting the station in 1885, saw a sign advertising cheap workmen's tickets for trains scheduled to arrive in London before 8 am, only to find that the timetable showed that there were no trains that met that criterion. The old Enfield Station closed to passengers in 1910 and was replaced by the present station, but remained in use as a goods depot until 1974. The surviving buildings were demolished and replaced in the 2000s with housing along a new street, Gladbeck Way.

=== The new high level station ===
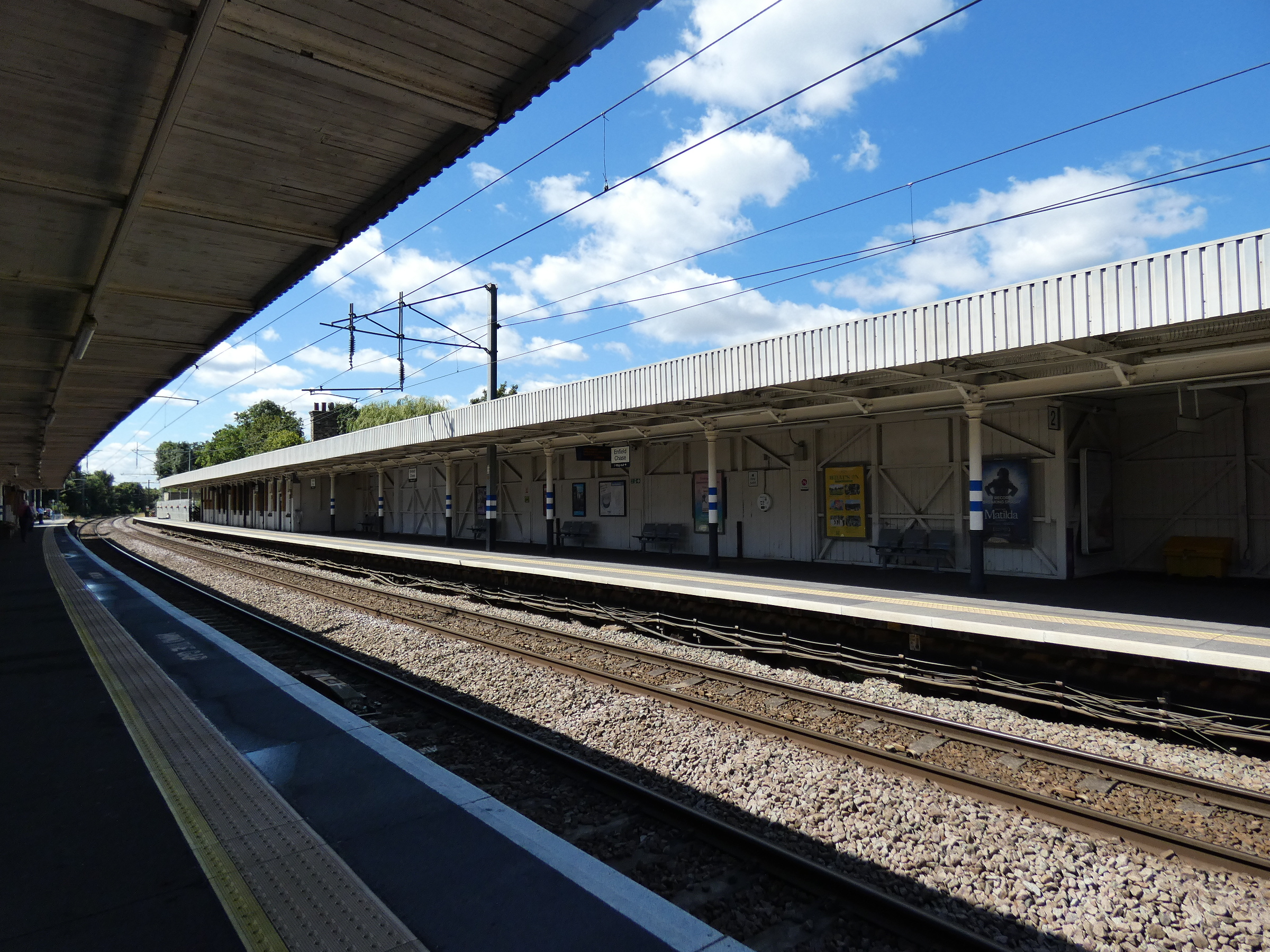
The platforms at Enfield Chase Station

By the end of the 19th century, there was a need to relieve the pressure on the main line to the north out of Kings Cross, and a plan to continue the Enfield branch to Hertford and Stevenage was conceived. An Act of Parliament was passed in 1898, and the GNR set about acquiring and demolishing houses and compensating land owners in the area. Work on the line commenced in 1906. The new Enfield Station was sited a few hundred yards to the east of the existing one, and raised above ground level so that north bound trains could access a new bridge crossing the road at Windmill Hill. It opened on 4 April 1910 for services as far as Cuffley. The first through train to Stevenage did not run until 4 March 1918, because of a host of legal and engineering difficulties, and shortages of men and material caused by World War I. The name Enfield Chase was adopted in 1924, to avoid confusion with Enfield Town station.

== Services ==
All services at Enfield Chase are operated by Great Northern using Class 717 EMUs.

The typical off-peak service in trains per hour is:

- 2 tph to Moorgate
- 2 tph to Stevenage via Hertford North

Additional services call at the station during the peak hours.

Preceding station	National Rail	Following station
Grange Park	Great Northern Hertford Loop Line	Gordon Hill

== Connections ==
London Buses routes 121, 231, 307, 313, 377 and 456 serve the station.

== See also ==
- Enfield Lock railway station
- Enfield Town railway station
