= Goffs Oak =

Village in Hertfordshire, England

Coordinates: 51.7109°N 0.0825°W

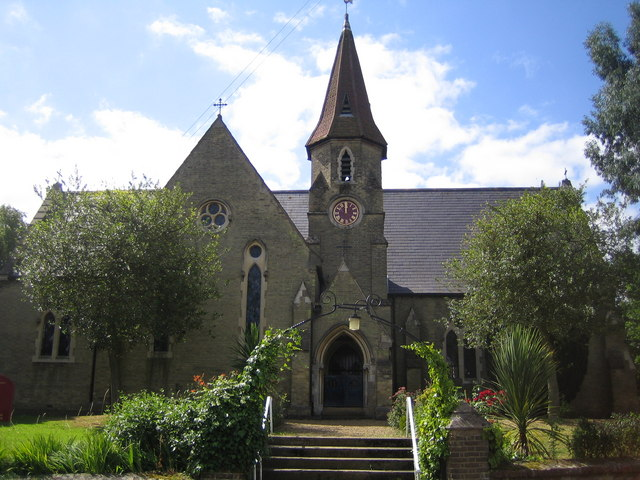
- St James', the Church of England parish church for the village.

- Location within Hertfordshire
- Population: 8,172 (2011 Census. Ward)
- OS grid reference: TL325035
- District: Broxbourne
- Shire county: Hertfordshire
- Region: East
- Country: England
- Sovereign state: United Kingdom
- Post town: Waltham Cross
- Postcode district: EN7
- Dialling code: 01707
- Police: Hertfordshire
- Fire: Hertfordshire
- Ambulance: East of England
- UK Parliament: Broxbourne

Goffs Oak (Goff's Oak on Ordnance Survey maps) is a large village in the borough of Broxbourne in Hertfordshire in the United Kingdom. It lies between Cuffley and Cheshunt, just north of the M25 motorway in a slightly more rural section of the London commuter belt.

== History ==
The village is named after the Goff family, who owned much of the land in the area, and is symbolised by the original Old Oak, said to be several hundred years old before it fell in the 1950s. Its replacement fell itself after severe damage during the storm of 1987. The Spurs squad, during the mid-1950s, used to run down Burton Lane as part of their "circuit" training, back to their training ground on Brookfield Lane.

The village centre is marked by a War Memorial which was unveiled on 20 December 1920 and is inscribed with the names of 32 men from the village who were killed in the First World War. A further three names were added following the Second World War. The houses on Goffs Lane north-east of the memorial were opened in 1895 as the village's Metropolitan Police station, (Note: From the 1840 until 2000 the village fell in the Metropolitan Police District.) possibly after lobbying from Lady Meux about rising crime on her Theobalds estate. Even after the station's closure and sale in 1972, the area remained part of Y Division (later District) until it was transferred to Hertfordshire Constabulary in 2000. Next to the police station was a civil defence siren as part of the national defence at the height of the Cold War, which was regularly tested in the 1960s and could be heard across the whole village area.

Goffs Oak has been used as a film location. In the 1970s, Timeslip, a popular children's science fiction series, was filmed at Burnt Farm Army Camp in Silver Street. The Protectors, filmed in the 1970s and starring Robert Vaughn, also used the former army camp as a location.

== Education ==
Local primary schools are Goffs Oak and Woodside. Goffs Academy, a secondary school previously called Goffs School, is nearby in Cheshunt.

== Religion ==
The village gained its own Church of England District Church of St James's in 1861 before it and Hammondstreet were formally split off from the ancient parish of Cheshunt ten years later.

Roman Catholics in the village have been served by St Martin de Porres Church in nearby Cuffley since 1963. The original Goffs Oak Methodist Church was built in 1868, but was replaced by a modern building in the 1970s. It is in Newgatestreet Road, close to the War Memorial.

== Notable people ==
Victoria Beckham was raised in the village. Former Netherlands striker Robin Van Persie lived in the area. The tennis player Richard Lewis lived in Jones Road, Goffs Oak, and attended Goffs School during the late 1960s and early 1970s. He went on to represent Great Britain in the Davis Cup, and is now Chair of SportEngland. In April 2012, Richard Lewis was appointed chief executive officer at the All England Tennis Club, Wimbledon. The former Glamorgan wicketkeeper Colin Metson, now Community and Cricket Development Manager of Glamorgan County Cricket Club, was born in the village in 1963.

Buster Miekle, a member of Unit 4 + 2 (a local group who in 1965 sang the No.1 hit song Concrete and Clay) used to live in Goffs Oak.

== Transport links ==
The nearest railway stations to Goffs Oak are Cuffley (services to London's Kings Cross station) and Cheshunt (services to London Liverpool Street).
