= Cuffley railway station =

Station in Hertfordshire, England

Coordinates: 51.709°N 0.110°W

Cuffley
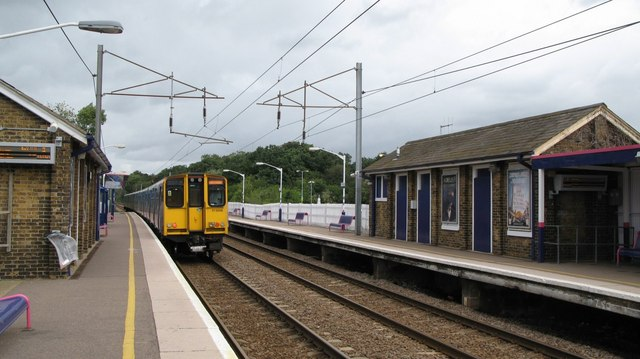
- Interactive map of Cuffley

General information
- Location: Cuffley
- Local authority: Welwyn Hatfield
- Grid reference: TL307028
- Managed by: Great Northern
- Station code: CUF
- DfT category: D
- Number of platforms: 2
- Fare zone: A

National Rail annual entry and exit
- 2020–21: ▼0.137 million
- 2021–22: ▲0.395 million
- 2022–23: ▲0.570 million
- 2023–24: ▲0.616 million
- 2024–25: ▲0.663 million

Railway companies
- Original company: Great Northern Railway
- Pre-grouping: Great Northern Railway
- Post-grouping: London and North Eastern Railway

Key dates
- 4 April 1910: Opened as Cuffley
- 25 May 1910: Renamed Cuffley and Goff's Oak
- 18 March 1971: Renamed Cuffley

Other information
- External links: Departures; Facilities

Cuffley railway station serves the village of Cuffley in the Welwyn Hatfield district of Hertfordshire. It also serves other nearby settlements, namely Goffs Oak, Northaw and the west of Cheshunt. It is 13 miles 17 chains (13.21 miles, 21.26 km) down the line from London King's Cross on the Hertford Loop line. The station is managed and operated by Great Northern.

The station opened in 1910 on the Hertford Loop line between Enfield Chase and Hertford North as Cuffley and Goff's Oak, with the suffix being dropped some time later. The opening of the station allowed Cuffley to expand as an attractive commuter village with regular services to London King's Cross and Broad Street, the latter of which was replaced by Northern City Line trains to Moorgate in 1976. Cuffley was served by steam locomotives until 1960 when they were replaced by diesels; the line was electrified in 1976.

== Services ==
All services at Cuffley are operated by Great Northern using Class 717 EMUs.

The typical off-peak service in trains per hour is:

- 2 tph to Moorgate
- 2 tph to Stevenage via Hertford North

Additional services call at the station during the peak hours.

| Preceding station | National Rail | Following station |
|---|---|---|
| Crews Hill | Great Northern Hertford Loop Line | Bayford |
