= Bayford railway station =

Railway Station in Hertfordshire, England

Coordinates: 51.758°N 0.096°W

Bayford
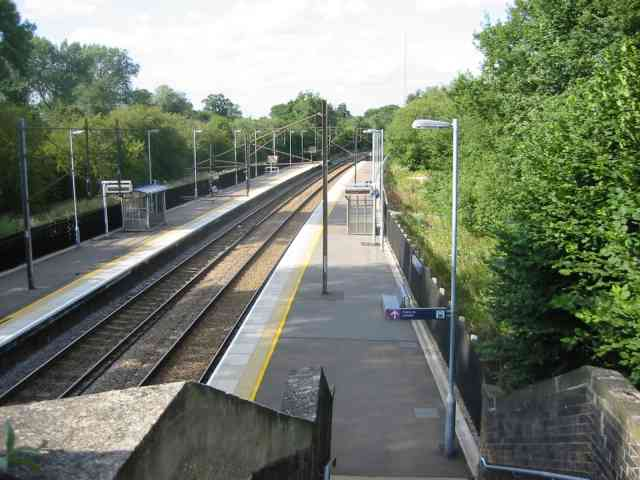
- Interactive map of Bayford

General information
- Location: Bayford
- Local authority: District of East Hertfordshire
- Grid reference: TL315083
- Managed by: Great Northern
- Station code: BAY
- DfT category: F2
- Number of platforms: 2
- Fare zone: B

National Rail annual entry and exit
- 2020–21: ▼13,750
- 2021–22: ▲34,538
- 2022–23: ▲55,776
- 2023–24: ▲65,400
- 2024–25: ▲78,874

Railway companies
- Original company: London and North Eastern Railway
- Post-grouping: London and North Eastern Railway

Key dates
- 2 June 1924: Opened

Other information
- External links: Departures; Facilities

Bayford railway station serves the villages of Bayford and Brickendon in Hertfordshire, England. The station is on the Hertford Loop Line, 16 miles 56 chains (16.70 miles, 26.88 km) down the line from London King's Cross.

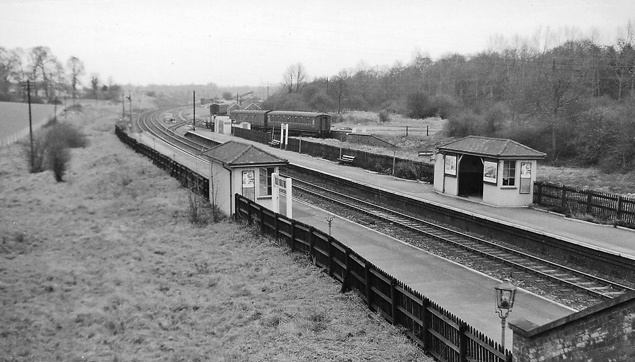
Bayford Station in 1961

== Services ==
All services at Bayford are operated by Great Northern using Class 717 EMUs.

The typical off-peak service in trains per hour is:

- 2 tph to Moorgate
- 2 tph to Stevenage via Hertford North

Additional services call at the station during the peak hours.

Preceding station	National Rail	Following station
Cuffley	Great Northern Hertford Loop Line	Hertford North
