= Palmers Green railway station =

National Rail station in London, England

Palmers Green
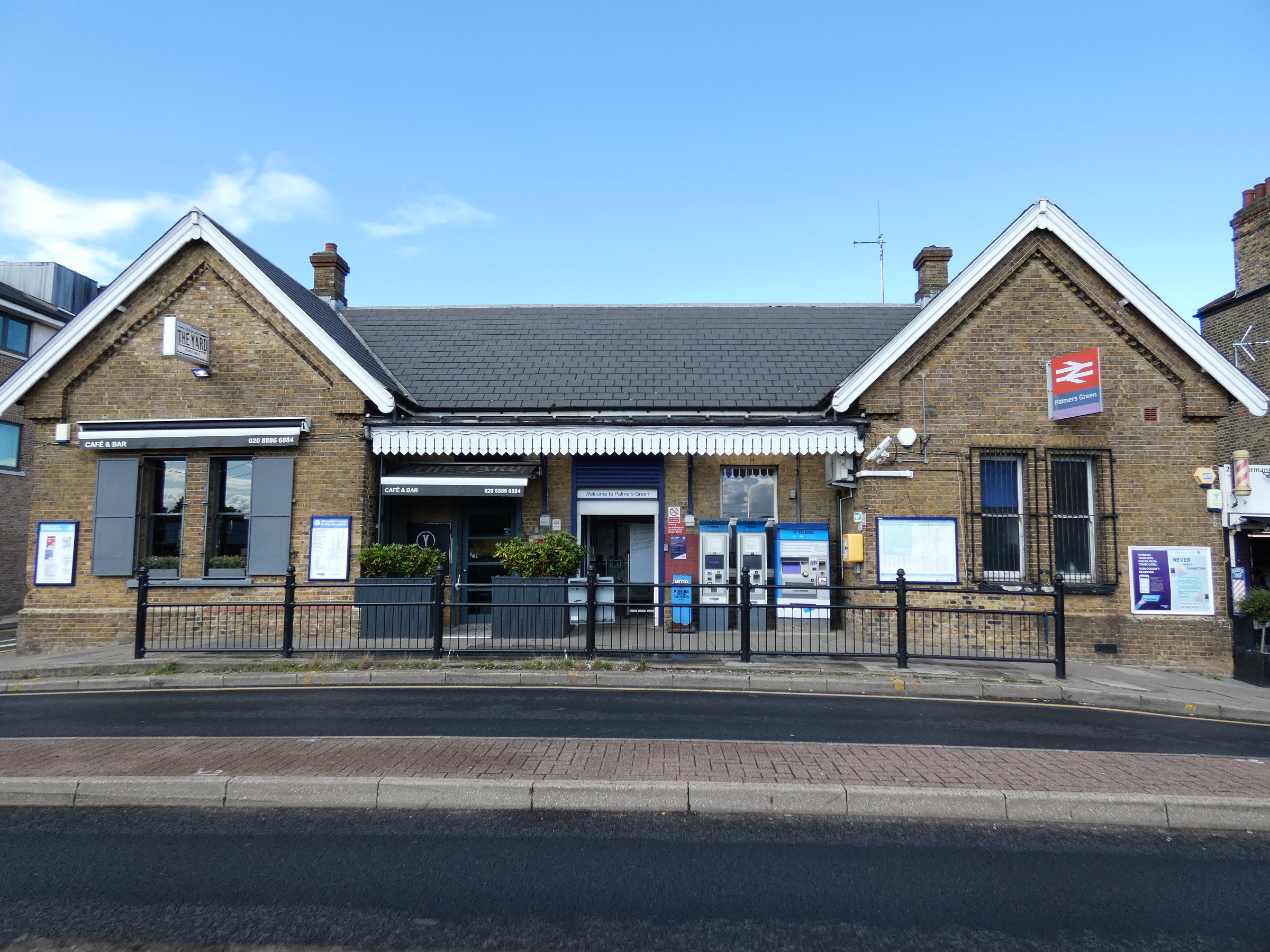
- Palmers Green Station
- Interactive map of Palmers Green

General information
- Location: Palmers Green
- Local authority: London Borough of Enfield
- Managed by: Great Northern
- Station code: PAL
- DfT category: C2
- Number of platforms: 2
- Fare zone: 4

National Rail annual entry and exit
- 2020–21: ▼0.464 million
- 2021–22: ▲0.918 million
- 2022–23: ▲1.268 million
- 2023–24: ▲1.393 million
- 2024–25: ▲1.557 million

Key dates
- 1871: Opened

Other information
- External links: Departures; Facilities
- Coordinates: 51.6184°N 0.1102°W

Palmers Green railway station, in Aldermans Hill, is a train station in the London Borough of Enfield in north London, located within London fare zone 4. It is 6 miles 50 chains (6.63 miles, 10.66 km) on the line from London King's Cross. The station and all trains serving it are operated by Great Northern.

The station was originally named Palmer's Green & Southgate. It consists of two through platforms numbered 1 and 2 with a pair of tracks in between.

The station has no lifts as of 2023, with plans to install them.

== Services ==
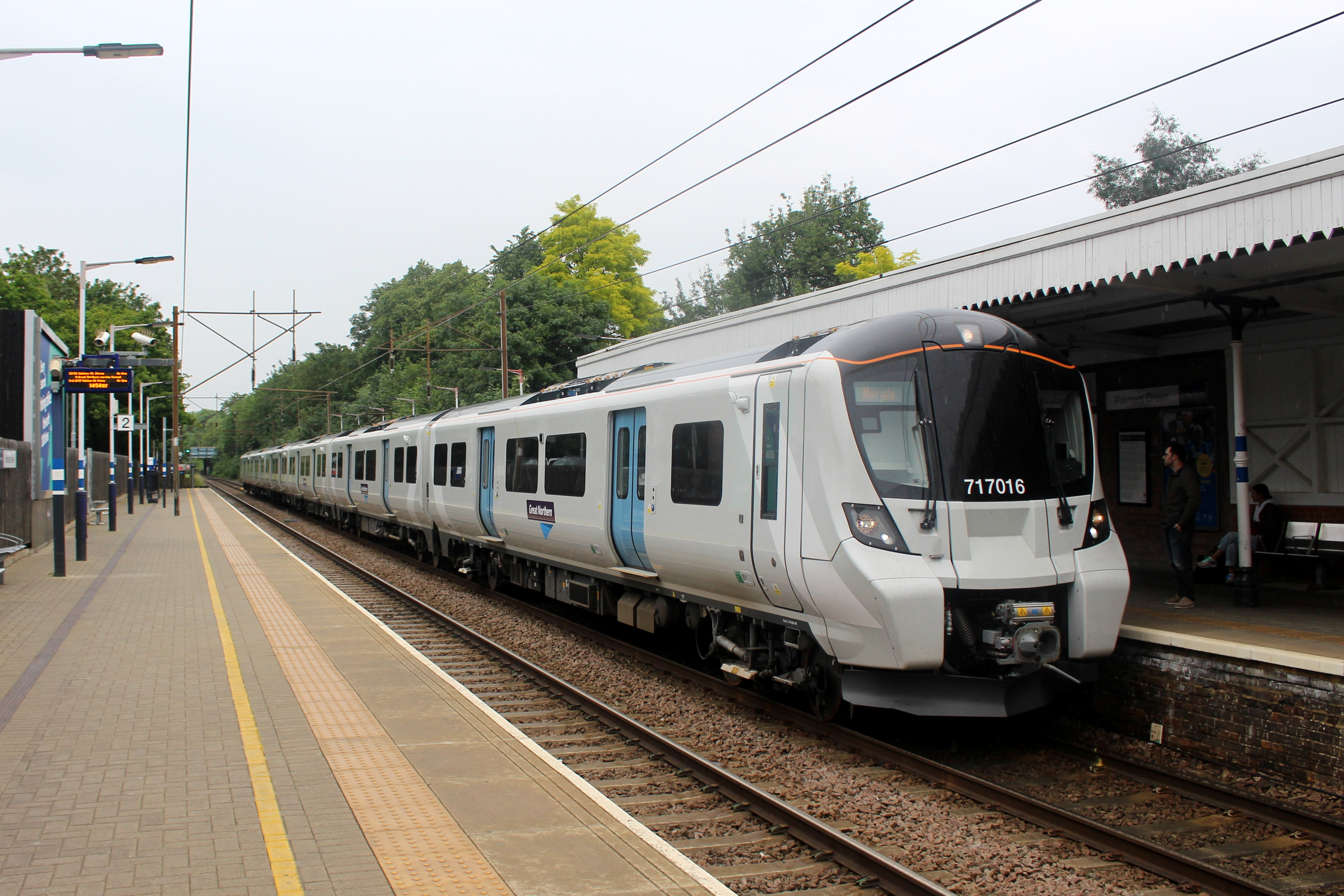
Great Northern Class 717 Desiro City 717016 at Palmers Green

All services at Palmers Green are operated by Great Northern using Class 717 EMUs.

Preceding station	National Rail	Following station
Bowes Park	Great Northern Hertford Loop Line	Winchmore Hill
