= Hertford North railway station =

Network Rail station in Hertfordshire, England

Hertford North
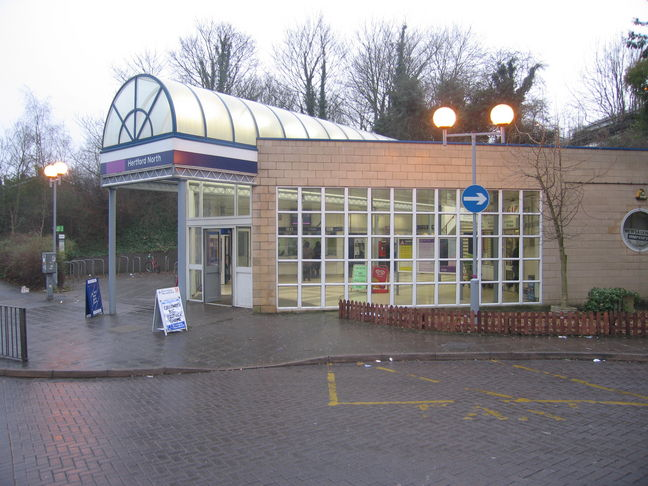
- The street-level entrance to the station
- Interactive map of Hertford North

General information
- Location: Hertford
- Local authority: District of East Hertfordshire
- Grid reference: TL316128
- Managed by: Great Northern
- Station code: HFN
- DfT category: C2
- Number of platforms: 3
- Accessible: Yes
- Fare zone: B

National Rail annual entry and exit
- 2020–21: ▼0.233 million
- Interchange: ▼720
- 2021–22: ▲0.646 million
- Interchange: ▲2,590
- 2022–23: ▲0.863 million
- Interchange: ▲3,772
- 2023–24: ▲0.969 million
- Interchange: ▼3,364
- 2024–25: ▲1.032 million
- Interchange: ▼446

Railway companies
- Original company: London and North Eastern Railway
- Post-grouping: London and North Eastern Railway

Key dates
- 2 June 1924: Opened

Other information
- External links: Departures; Facilities
- Coordinates: 51.7988°N 0.0918°W

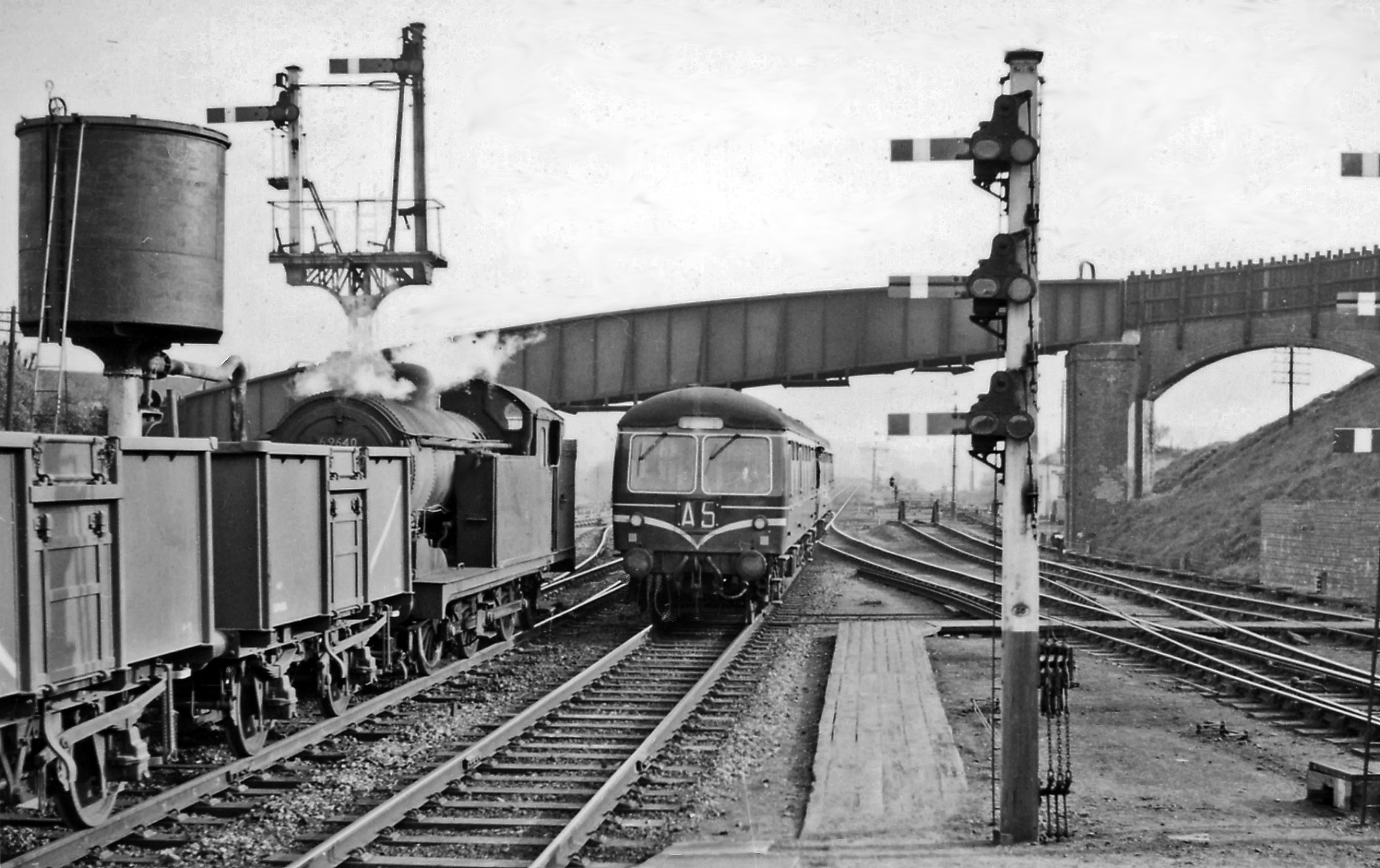
View southwards from the Down platform in 1959

Hertford North railway station is one of two stations serving the town of Hertford in Hertfordshire, England, the other being Hertford East railway station.

== Location ==
Hertford North is about ten minutes walk from the town centre in North Road and opened on 2 June 1924, replacing the similarly named station (known until 1923 as Hertford Cowbridge) on the branch from Hatfield.

It is 19 miles 48 chains (19.60 miles, 31.54 km) down the line from London King's Cross on the Hertford Loop Line which provides a diversion from the East Coast Main Line from Alexandra Palace to Langley Junction just south of Stevenage. Stations on the line include Stevenage, Watton-at-Stone, Bayford and Cuffley. Trains on this line are run by Great Northern.

The station has one terminal and two through platforms and features a lift (to platforms 2 and 3), a small shop, two ticket booths and ticket barriers.

On Friday 6th November 2026, a new lift opened to Platform 1, making the station fully accessible from street to all platforms..

== Platform layout ==
Platform 1 is mainly used for trains to Moorgate, originating in Stevenage. Platform 2 is mainly used for trains originating in London proceeding north to Stevenage. Platform 3 is a bay platform used only as a terminus for trains from London.

== Services ==
All services at Hertford North are operated by Great Northern using Class 717 EMUs.

The typical off-peak service in trains per hour is:

- 2 tph to Moorgate
- 2 tph to Stevenage

Additional services originate or terminate at the station during weekday peak hours, when services increase to 4 tph to/from Moorgate. A few trains also originate here in the early morning and end here in the evening.

Preceding station	National Rail	Following station
Bayford	Great Northern Hertford Loop Line	Watton-at-Stone
Bayford	Great Northern Hertford Loop Line	Terminus
	Historical railways	
Bayford Line and station open	London and North Eastern Railway Hertford Loop Line	Stapleford Line open, station closed
