= British Rail Class 717 =

Trains on services into Moorgate, London

British Rail Class 717; Desiro City
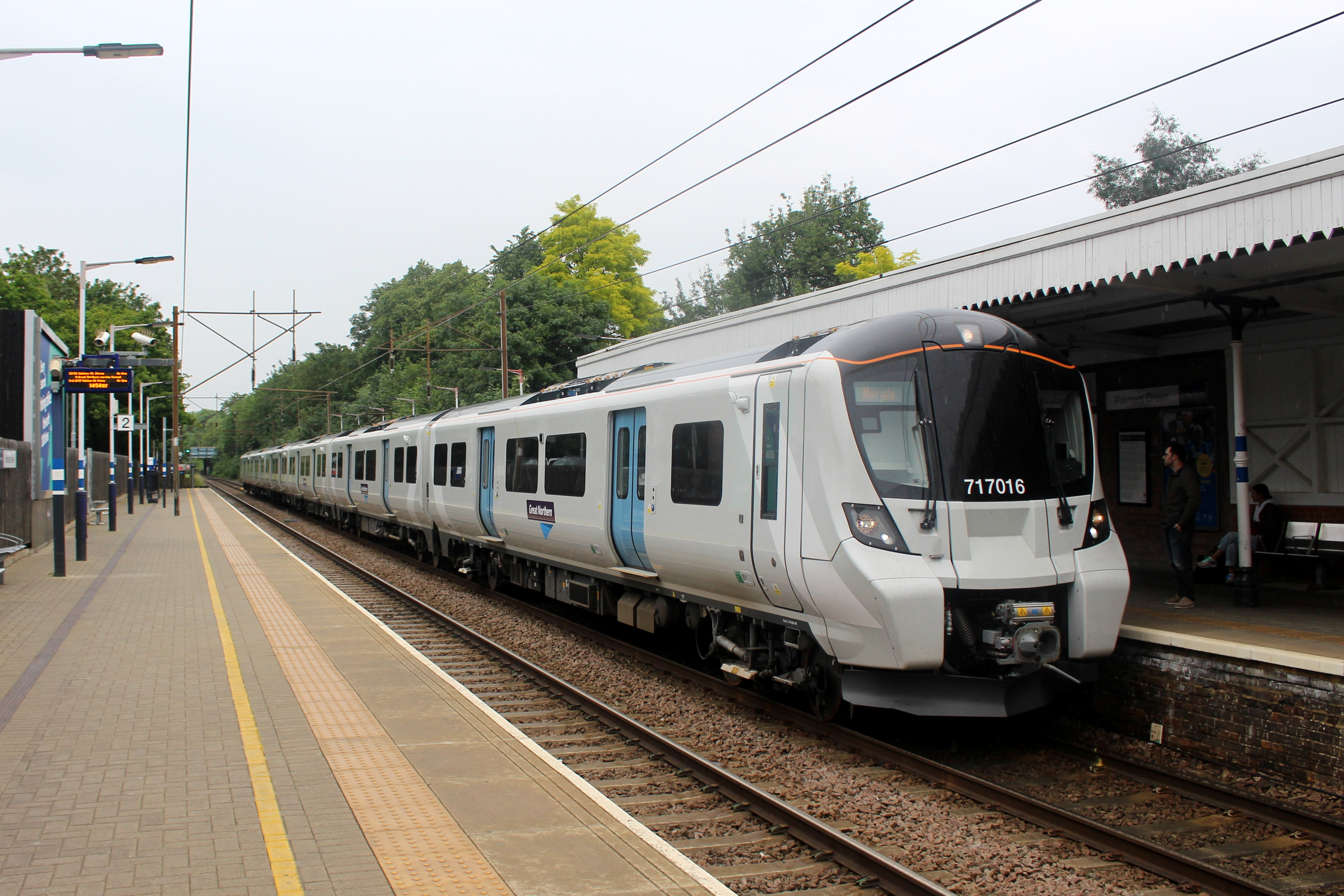
- Great Northern Class 717 unit at Palmers Green

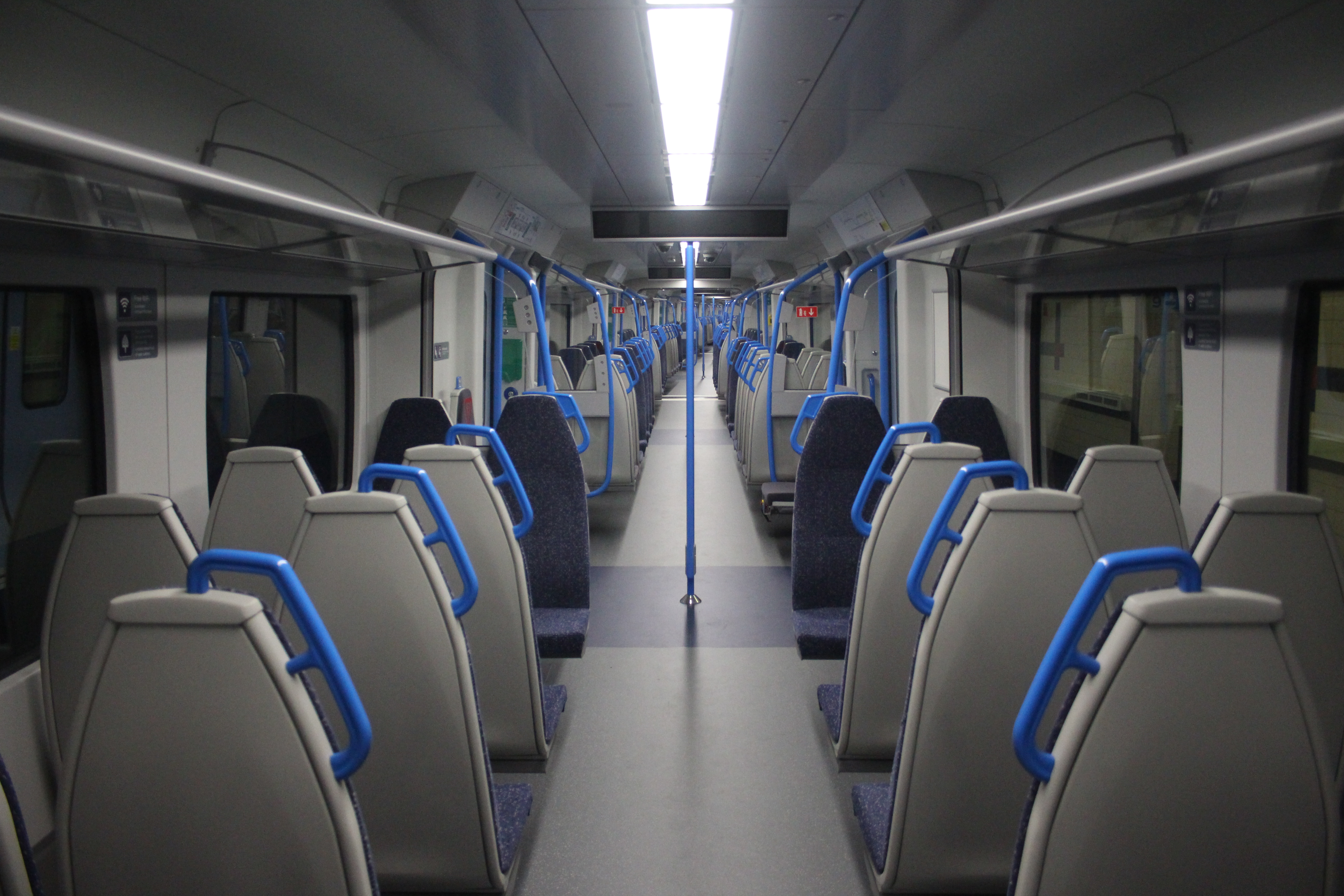
- The standard-class interior of a Class 717 unit
- In service: 28 September 2018 – present
- Manufacturer: Siemens Mobility
- Built at: Krefeld, Germany
- Family name: Desiro City
- Replaced: Class 313
- Constructed: 2018
- Number built: 25
- Number in service: 25
- Formation: 6 cars per unit: DMOS-TOS-TOS(L)W-MOS-PTOS-DMOS
- Fleet numbers: 717001–717025
- Capacity: 362 seats
- Owner: Rock Rail
- Operator: Great Northern
- Depot: Hornsey (London)
- Lines served: East Coast Main Line; Hertford Loop Line; Northern City Line

Specifications
- Car body construction: Aluminium
- Train length: 121.7 m (399 ft 3 in)
- Car length: 20.2 m (66 ft)
- Width: 2.80 m (9 ft 2 in)
- Floor height: 1.10 m (3 ft 7 in)
- Doors: Double-leaf pocket sliding, each 1,500 mm (59 in) wide (2 per side per car)
- Wheel diameter: 820–760 mm (32.28–29.92 in) (new–worn)
- Wheelbase: Motor bogies: 2,200 mm (87 in); Trailer bogies: 2,100 mm (83 in)
- Maximum speed: 85 mph (137 km/h)
- Weight: 204 t (201 LT; 225 ST)
- Axle load: Motor bogies: 15.5 t (15.3 LT; 17.1 ST); Trailer bogies: 14.5 t (14.3 LT; 16.0 ST)
- Traction system: Siemens IGBT
- Power output: 1,200 kW (1,600 hp) at wheels
- Acceleration: 0.85 m/s^{2} (1.9 mph/s)
- Electric systems: Overhead line, 25 kV 50 Hz AC; Third rail, 750 V DC
- Current collection: Pantograph (AC); Contact shoe (DC)
- UIC classification: Bo′Bo′+2′2′+2′2′+Bo′Bo′+2′2′+Bo′Bo′
- Bogies: Siemens SGP SF7000
- Minimum turning radius: 120 m (390 ft)
- Braking systems: Electro-pneumatic (disc) and regenerative
- Safety systems: AWS; ETCS; TPWS; Tripcock (Note: Tripcocks were removed in May 2023 following the May 2022 completion of the Northern City Line tripcock-to-TPWS conversion programme.)
- Coupling system: Dellner
- Track gauge: 1,435 mm (4 ft 8 1/2 in) standard gauge

Notes/references
- Sourced from unless otherwise noted.

The British Rail Class 717 Desiro City is an electric multiple unit passenger train built by Siemens Mobility, currently operated by Greater Thameslink Railway on its Great Northern Hertford Loop and Welwyn stopping routes. Built to replace Class 313 trains on services into Moorgate, a total of 25 six-car units began entering regular service from March 2019. The units are similar to the Class 700s (in use with Thameslink) and the Class 707s (in use with Southeastern).

== History ==
Upon winning the Thameslink, Southern and Great Northern franchise, Govia Thameslink Railway (GTR) announced that it would seek to procure new trains totalling 150 vehicles to replace the then-40-year-old Class 313 units operating on services to and from Moorgate. In December 2015, GTR announced that it had selected Siemens to provide this new fleet, originally designated Class 713, as a follow-on order from the main Class 700 order, with entry into service expected from March 2019. The order was finalised in February 2016.

A significant difference between Class 717s and the earlier Class 700s is the provision of fold-down emergency doors at both ends of each train. These are required for emergency evacuation of passengers while inside the deep-level Northern City Line tunnels. The maximum permitted service speed is 85 mph (137 km/h).

Siemens began testing the Class 717 units in Germany during June 2018.

=== Operation ===
The first unit operated a single preview service in late September 2018, with gradual introduction from the spring of 2019. The final Class 313 service on Great Northern ran in September 2019, completing the fleet replacement by Class 717 units.

== In-cab signalling ==
In September 2021, the installation of European Train Control System (ETCS) on the Class 717 fleet was successfully tested on the Thameslink 'core' route between St Pancras International and Blackfriars stations in central London. The success of the test allowed Govia Thameslink Railway to work towards enabling the use of ETCS in passenger service on the Northern City Line in November 2023, which was followed by the decommissioning and removal of the existing conventional signalling system in May 2025. ETCS is now being introduced to the southern section of the East Coast Main Line as part of the East Coast Digital Programme.

ETCS software is being upgraded. On 8 July 2025, unit 717020 ran on the Northern City Line using ETCS Baseline 3, Release 2 (also referred to as version 3.6.0).

== Environment ==
Class 717 trains generate electricity through regenerative braking. The trains are also 20% lighter than their predecessors, making them more energy efficient.

== Fleet details ==
| Class | Operator | Qty. | Year built | Cars per unit | Unit nos. |
|---|---|---|---|---|---|
| 717 | Great Northern | 25 | 2018 | 6 | 717001–717025 |

=== Illustration ===
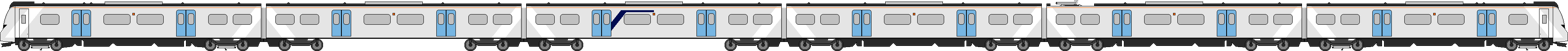
Side-profile illustration of a Great Northern Class 717 unit
