= Baldock railway station =

Railway station in Hertfordshire, England

Coordinates: 51.993°N 0.188°W

Baldock
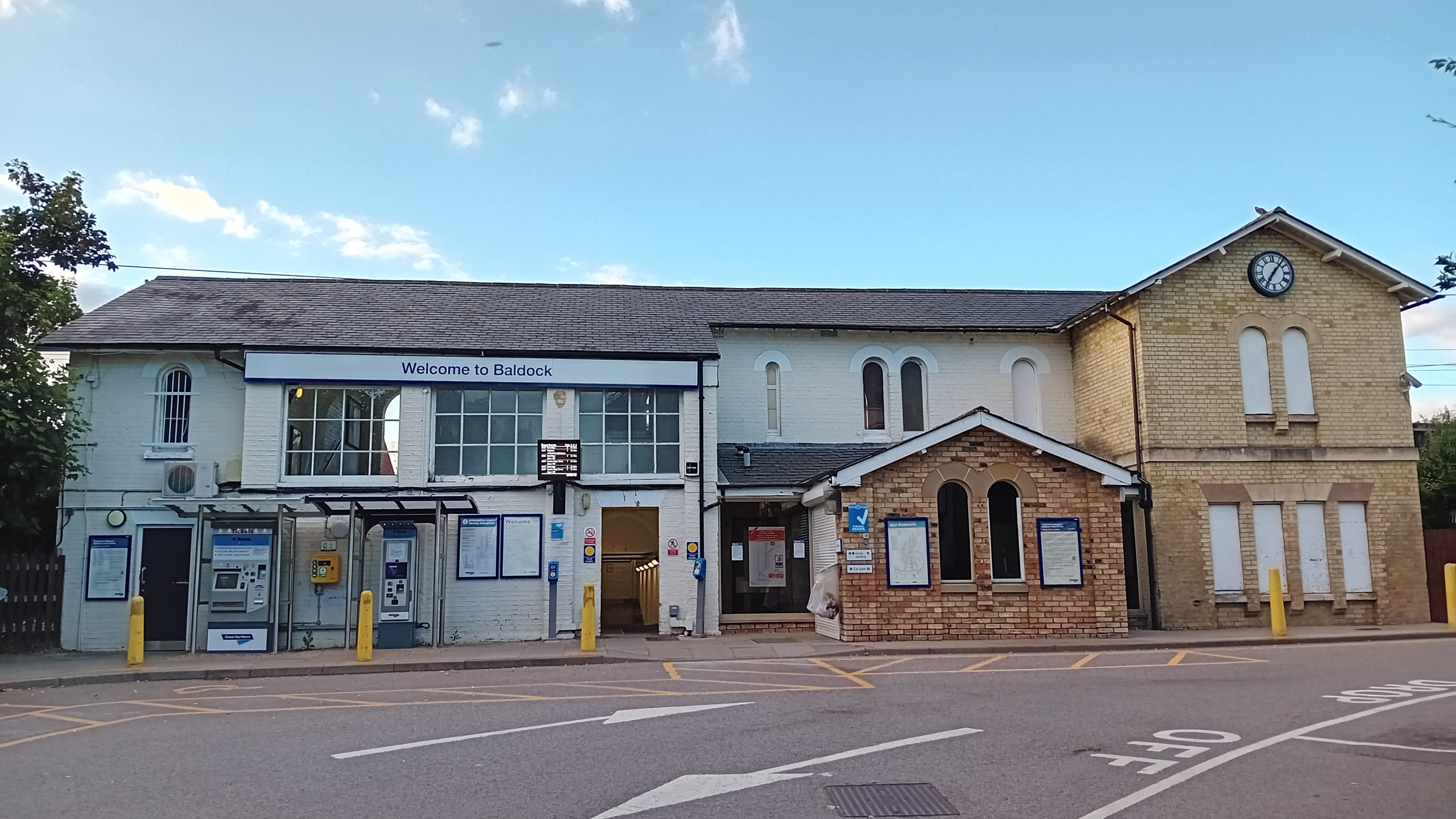
- View of the station from the road

General information
- Location: Baldock, District of North Hertfordshire; England
- Grid reference: TL245342
- Managed by: Great Northern
- Platforms: 2

Other information
- Station code: BDK
- Classification: DfT category E

History
- Opened: 21 October 1850

Passengers
- 2020–21: ▼0.154 million
- 2021–22: ▲0.387 million
- 2022–23: ▲0.503 million
- 2023–24: ▲0.527 million
- 2024–25: ▲0.569 million
Location
Notes
- Passenger statistics from the Office of Rail and Road

Baldock railway station serves the historic market town of Baldock, in Hertfordshire, England. It is a stop on the Cambridge Line, sited 36 miles 47 chains (58.9 km) north of London King's Cross and on the outskirts of the town.

== History ==
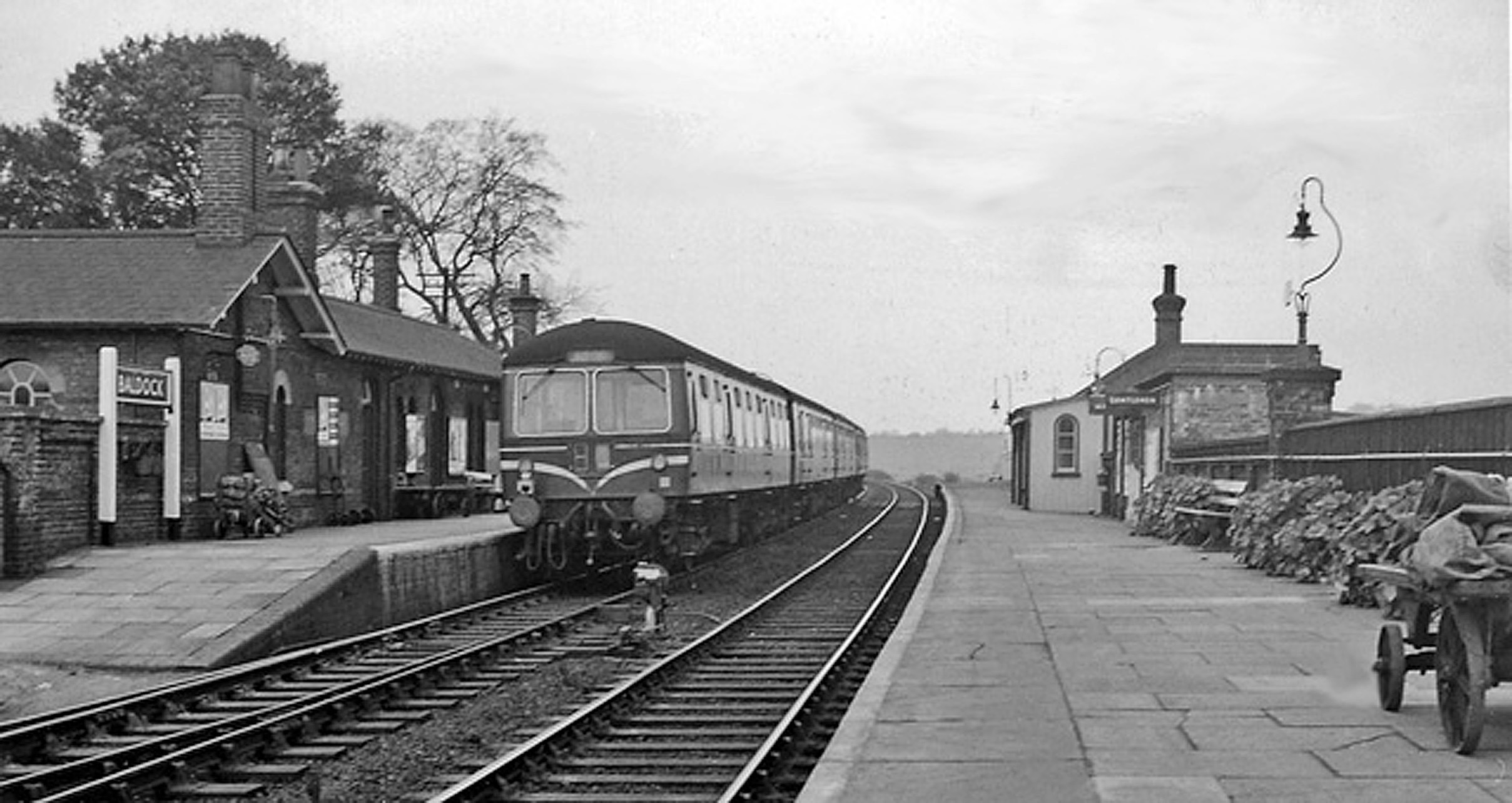
The station in 1961

Opened by the Royston and Hitchin Railway, then run by the Great Northern Railway, it became part of the London and North Eastern Railway during the grouping of 1923. The station then passed on to the Eastern Region of British Railways on nationalisation in 1948.

When sectorisation was introduced in the 1980s, the station was served by Network SouthEast until the privatisation of British Rail.

The station is part of the Thameslink Programme which connects Cambridge with Farringdon, City Thameslink and Blackfriars station, via the Great Northern Route. This project went live in 2018.

== Services ==
Services at Baldock are operated by Thameslink and Great Northern using Classes 387 and 700 electric multiple units.

The typical off-peak service in trains per hour is:

- 1 tph to London King's Cross (stopping)
- 2 tph to Brighton, via London Bridge and Gatwick Airport (semi-fast)
- 3 tph to Cambridge (2 of these run semi-fast and 1 calls at all stations)

During peak hours, the service to London King's Cross and the all stations service to Cambridge are increased to 2 tph.

On Sundays, the service between Brighton and Cambridge is reduced to hourly.

Preceding station	National Rail	Following station
Letchworth Garden City	Thameslink Hitchin to Cambridge Line	Ashwell & Morden
Letchworth Garden City	Great Northern Hitchin to Cambridge Line	Ashwell & Morden or Royston
