= Ashwell & Morden railway station =

Railway station in Cambridgeshire, England

Ashwell & Morden
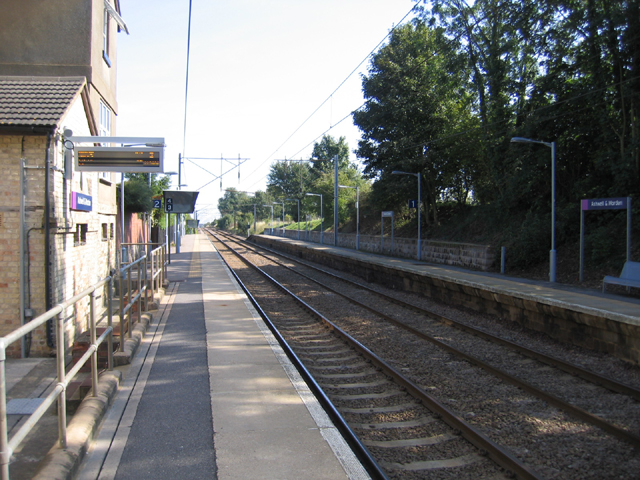

General information
- Location: Odsey, South Cambridgeshire; England
- Coordinates: 52.031°N 0.110°W
- Grid reference: TL298386
- Managed by: Great Northern
- Platforms: 2

Other information
- Station code: AWM
- Classification: DfT category E

History
- Original company: Royston and Hitchin Railway
- Pre-grouping: Great Northern Railway
- Post-grouping: London and North Eastern Railway

Key dates
- 21 October 1850: Opened as Ashwell
- 1 April 1920: Renamed Ashwell & Morden

Passengers
- 2020–21: ▼34,748
- 2021–22: ▲0.104 million
- 2022–23: ▲0.141 million
- 2023–24: ▲0.146 million
- 2024–25: ▲0.173 million
Location
Notes
- Passenger statistics from the Office of Rail and Road

Ashwell & Morden is a wayside railway station in Cambridgeshire, England. Close to the border with the county of Hertfordshire, it is in the hamlet of Odsey, slightly north of the Icknield Way, a Roman Road that is now the A505. It is 41 miles (65.98 km) down the line from London King's Cross. Train services are currently operated by Thameslink.

The villages it serves, as well as Odsey, are Ashwell, Guilden Morden and Steeple Morden, although it is located a couple of miles from each of them and linked to them only by minor roads.

== History ==
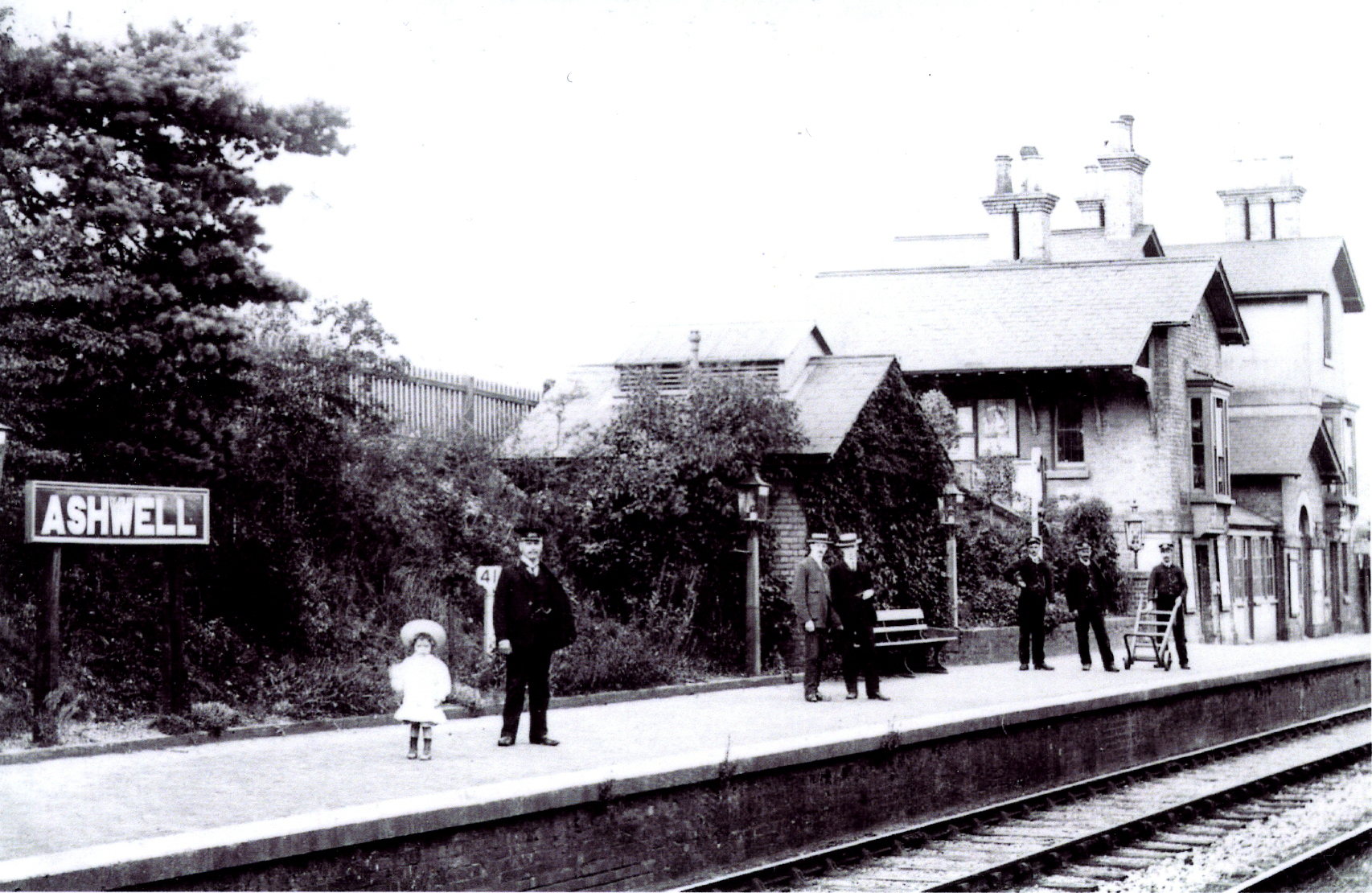
The station in 1920

Opened as Ashwell station by the Royston and Hitchin Railway (R&HR) on 21 October 1850, the R&HR was later absorbed by the Great Northern Railway (GNR). The name was changed to Ashwell and Morden on 1 April 1920 three years before the GNR amalgamated with several other railways to form the London and North Eastern Railway during the Grouping of 1923. The station then passed on to the Eastern Region of British Railways on nationalisation in 1948.

When sectorisation was introduced in the 1980s, the station was served by Network SouthEast until the privatisation of British Rail.

== Services ==
Off-peak, all services at Ashwell & Morden are operated by Thameslink using Class 700 electric multiple units.

The typical off-peak service in trains per hour is:

- 2 tph to Brighton, via London Bridge and Gatwick Airport (semi-fast)
- 2 tph to Cambridge

During peak hours, the station is served by a number of additional stopping services between Cambridge and London King's Cross, operated by Great Northern.

On Sundays, the service is reduced to hourly in each direction.

Preceding station	National Rail	Following station
Baldock	Thameslink Hitchin to Cambridge Line	Royston
Baldock	Great Northern Hitchin to Cambridge Line Peak Hours Only	Royston
