= Foxton railway station =

Railway station in Cambridgeshire, England

Coordinates: 52.119°N 0.057°E

Foxton
- Platform 1, for London Kings Cross

General information
- Location: Foxton, South Cambridgeshire; England
- Grid reference: TL409487
- Manager: Great Northern
- Platforms: 2

Other information
- Station code: FXN
- Classification: DfT category F2

Key dates
- 1 April 1852: Station opened

Passengers
- 2020–21: ▼30,564
- 2021–22: ▲75,252
- 2022–23: ▲87,794
- 2023–24: ▲94,124
- 2024–25: ▲98,982
Location
Notes
- Passenger statistics from the Office of Rail and Road

Foxton railway station serves the village of Foxton in Cambridgeshire, England. It is 50 miles 77 chains (50.96 miles, 82.02 km) from London King's Cross. The station is operated by Great Northern.

It is located adjacent to the busy A10 level crossing, which is monitored from the nearby signal box. A freight-only branch (the Barrington Light Railway) diverges to the west beyond the crossing south of the station, serving the nearby Barrington cement works & quarry.

== Services ==
All services at Foxton are operated by Great Northern using Class 387 EMUs.

The typical off-peak service is one train per hour in each direction between Cambridge and London King's Cross. Additional services call at the station during the peak hours.

Preceding station	National Rail	Following station
Shepreth	Great Northern Cambridge Line	Cambridge South
	Disused railways	
Shepreth	British Rail Eastern Region Cambridge Line	Harston

== Developments ==
Platform 2 (for trains to Cambridge) was extended in Summer 2017 to allow 8-car trains to call without straddling the level crossing behind. Platform 1 was not lengthened, as it is located before the crossing and 8-car trains use Selective door operation to open the doors on the front four carriages only.
