= Foxton, Cambridgeshire =

Village in Cambridgeshire, England

Coordinates: 52.115°N 0.0586°E

Foxton
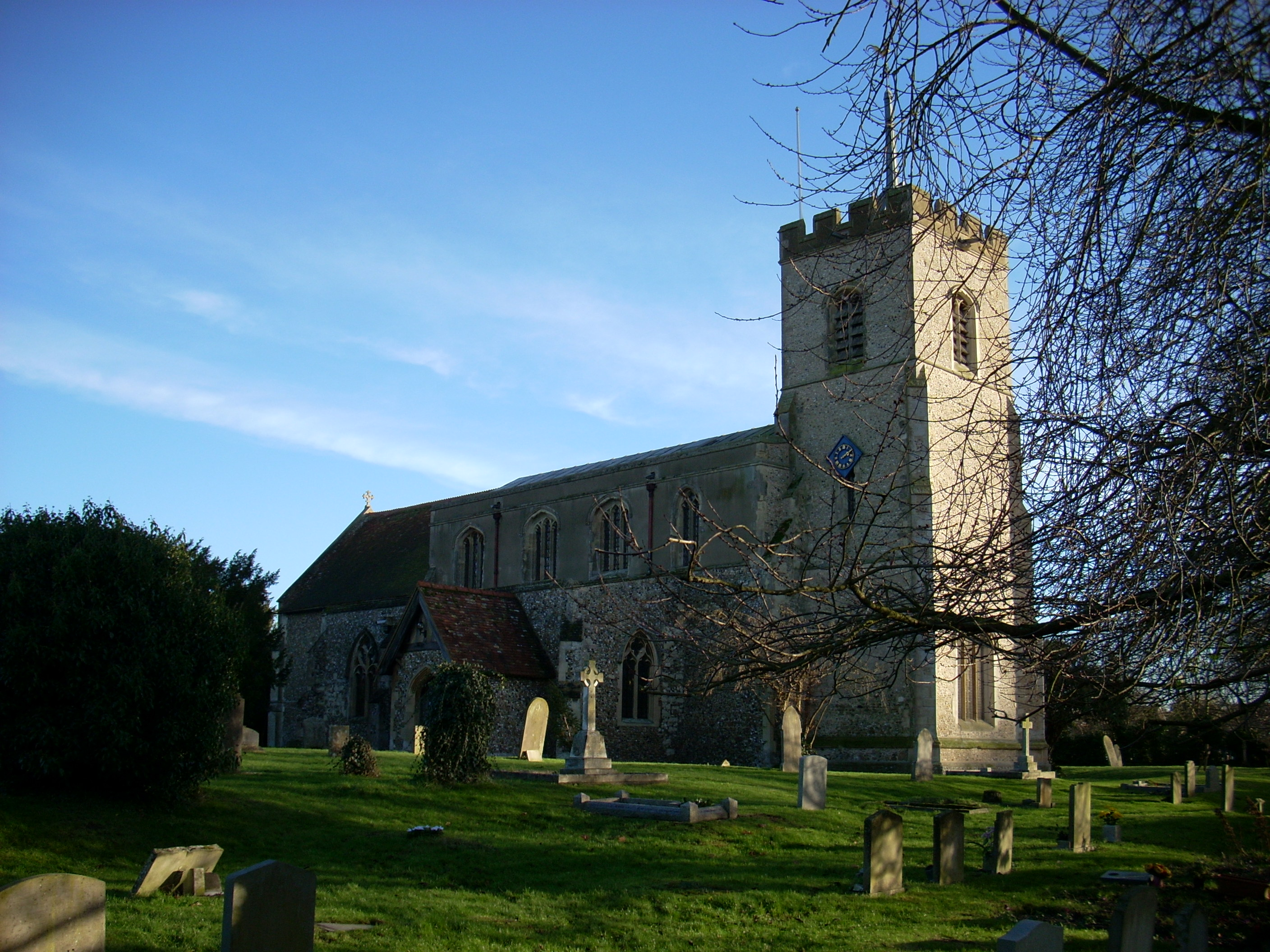
- Parish church of St Laurence

- Location within Cambridgeshire
- Population: 1,161; 1,260. (2011 Census)
- OS grid reference: TL4094048342
- Shire county: Cambridgeshire
- Region: East
- Country: England
- Sovereign state: United Kingdom
- Post town: Cambridge
- Postcode district: CB22
- Dialling code: 01223

Foxton is a small village in South Cambridgeshire, England. It has a number of well-preserved fifteenth- and sixteenth-century houses, and a thirteenth-century church dedicated to St Laurence.

== History ==
The parish has been occupied for at least 2000 years; in the first century A.D. a Belgic settlement appeared, closely followed by a Romano-British farmstead near Hoffer bridge. A pagan English cemetery has also been found just north of the railway station.

The parish itself was formed over the medieval period and is bounded on the north by the River Cam and on the north-east and southwest by the Hoffer and Shepreth brooks. Its south-east boundary follows an ancient road that runs north-east from Fowlmere, known as the Mareway from the 14th century (now the B1368), and further west by an earthwork known as Grim's ditch or Thriplow bank.

Known as Foxetune at the time of the Domesday Book in 1086, the village's name means "farmstead where foxes are seen".

The theologian William Selwyn lived in Foxton House in the village in the 19th century.

== Church ==
There has been a church in Foxton since the 12th century, and it has been dedicated to St Laurence since at least 1225. The present building, consisting of a west tower, porch, and chancel with aisled and clerestoried nave was probably begun in the 13th century and extended over the following 400 years.

== Demographics ==
Foxton's population is currently 1,260 (1,161 in 2001 census) split approximately 80:20 adults to children and occupying about 480 houses.

== Village life ==
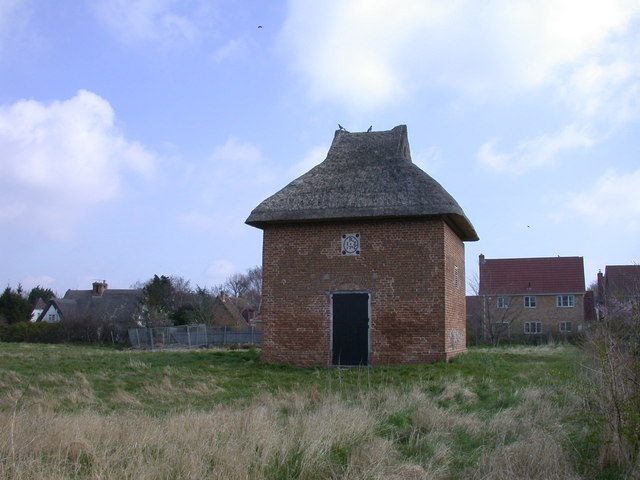
Restored dovecote originally built in 1706

Foxton has a mainline rail station (opened 1851) to London and is on the main bus route to Trumpington Park & Ride (where passengers can change for buses to Cambridge) and Royston.

The village has one remaining public house, The White Horse, that has been open since at least 1841, though it was rebuilt after a fire in 1880. Former drinking establishments included The Blackamoor's Head (later renamed The Black Boy) and The Railway Inn, which opened in around 1780 and 1860 respectively; however, both had closed by the 1960s.

Foxton is also home to a village shop and post office, primary school, learning centre, educational trust (Villiers Park) and The Burlington Press. The village has a recreation ground with children's playground, tennis courts, bowling green, football pitch and cricket pitches, and there is a modern village hall with meeting rooms and sports pavilion.

The village has a conservation area, Foxton Dovecot and Meadow, established in 2006. In 2010, the restoration of Rayner's dovecote received an award at the South Cambridgeshire District Council bi-annual built heritage awards.

Foxton also has a teenage football club called Dynamo Foxton Football club, established by Marcus Kohler and others when the players departed from their former club (Whittlesford).

== Literature ==
Foxton is known for being the subject of Rowland Parker's 1975 classic of local history The Common Stream. In it, Parker charts 2000 years of history of the village, from the Celts through to the Romans to the Saxons and the modern era.
