= Rowland Parker =

Rowland Parker (1912–1989) was an author and social historian. His 1975 work The Common Stream has achieved recognition as a classic of social history.

Parker was born in 1912 in North Lincolnshire. His father, grandfather and great-grandfather were all farmers and his youth was spent in the country. He was educated at Louth Grammar School, won a scholarship to the University of Nottingham and then trained as a teacher. In 1935 he joined the staff of what was then the Central School, Cambridge, and, except for the war, remained there until his retirement in 1972. He enlisted in the Royal Artillery in 1940, serving in North Africa, Italy, Egypt, Syria and Palestine, where he began to take an interest in archaeology and history. After the war, he moved to Foxton, and remained there until his death in 1989. He became known as a notable local figure after The Common Stream increased the village's national profile.

== Works ==
- Cottage on the Green (1973)
- The Common Stream (1975; new edition by Eland in 2015)
- On the Road: The Papworth Story (1977)
- Men of Dunwich: The Story of a Vanished Town (1979)
- Town and Gown: Seven Hundred Years' War in Cambridge (1983)
