= Cambridge line =

Railway between Hitchin and Cambridge in the East of England

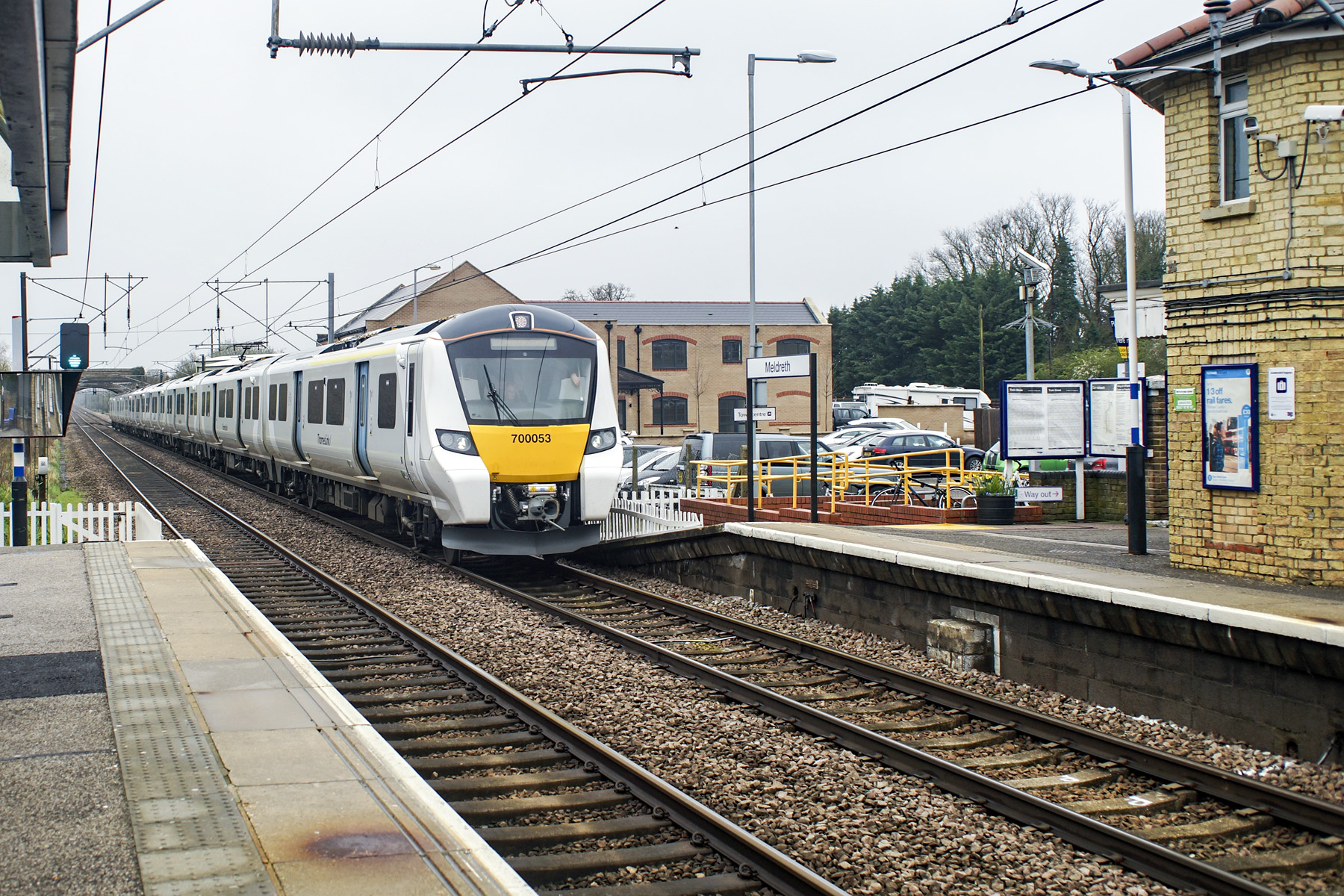
- A Thameslink Class 700 at Meldreth in 2018

Overview
- Status: Operational
- Owner: Network Rail
- Locale: East of England
- Termini: Hitchin 51.9533°N 0.2634°W; Cambridge 52.1943°N 0.1375°E
- Continues from: East Coast Main Line
- Continues as: Fen Line; Breckland line; Ipswich–Ely line
- Stations: 10

Service
- Type: Heavy rail
- System: National Rail
- Operator: Greater Thameslink Railway
- Depot: Letchworth EMU sidings
- Rolling stock: Class 379; Class 387; Class 700

History
- Opened: 1851
- Completed: 1862

Technical
- Line length: 23 miles 15 chains (23.19 miles, 37.32 km)
- Number of tracks: Double track throughout
- Track gauge: 4 ft 8 1/2 in (1,435 mm) standard gauge
- Loading gauge: W8
- Route availability: RA 7–9
- Electrification: 25 kV AC OHLE
- Operating speed: 90 mph (140 km/h) maximum
Route map
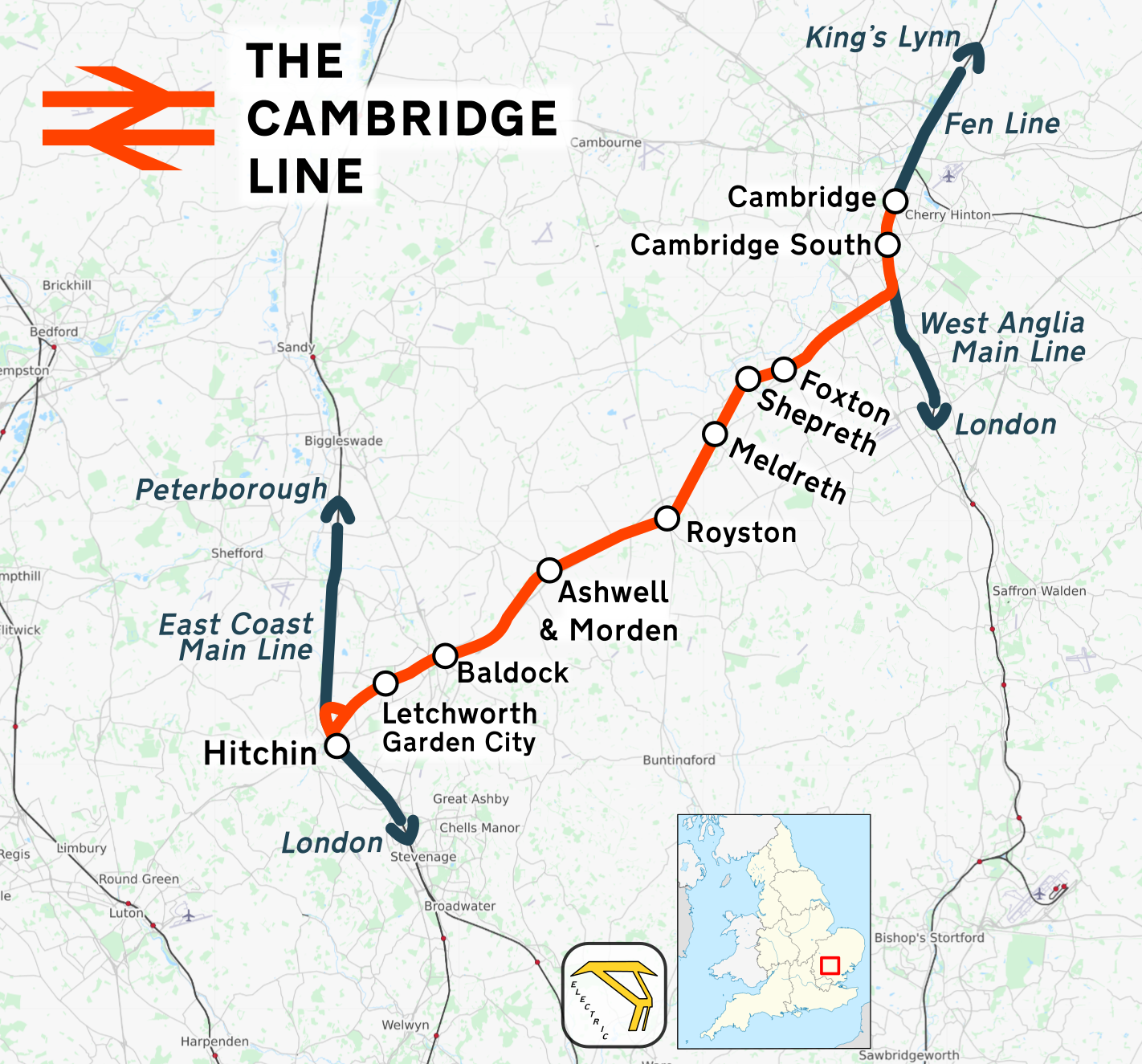
(Click to expand)

The Cambridge line is a railway line in the East of England; it connects the East Coast Main Line at Hitchin to the West Anglia Main Line at Cambridge. The line is owned by Network Rail and is 23 miles 15 chains (23.19 miles, 37.32 km) in length, serving ten stations. Train services are operated by Thameslink and Great Northern, both sub-brands of Greater Thameslink Railway.

Originally opened in 1851, the Royston and Hitchin Railway built a route between Hitchin and Shepreth. There, it met the Shepreth Branch Railway, and the two were joined in 1862 to form the modern route. A station at Letchworth was added in 1905 in conjunction with its opening as the world's first garden city. However, the line fell into decline throughout the mid 1900s, and Harston station was closed as part of the Beeching Axe in 1963.

The line was electrified as far as Royston in 1978, which severed through services on the line. Network SouthEast then expanded electrification to Cambridge in 1988, which was combined with major track improvements. In 2013, the new Hitchin Flyover marked the end of the historic bottleneck for trains entering the line at Hitchin. A new station opened at Cambridge South in 2026.

== History ==
=== 1846–1850: Beginnings of the railway ===
Royston and Hitchin Railway Act 1846
- Act of Parliament
- Parliament of the United Kingdom
- Long title: An Act for making a Railway from Royston to Hitchin.
- Citation: 9 & 10 Vict. c. clxx

Dates
- Royal assent: 16 July 1846

The Eastern Counties Railway (ECR) completed its main line from London to Norwich on 30 July 1845, running from the south through Cambridge and on to Ely. Cambridge was an important industrial and agricultural centre. The year 1846 was a peak time for the authorisation of railway schemes, part of the railway mania. The Great Northern Railway obtained its authorising act of Parliament, the Great Northern Railway Act 1846 (9 & 10 Vict. c. lxxi), on 26 June 1846; this was a huge project: it was to build a line from London to York, with a number of small branch lines.

The Royston and Hitchin Railway (R&HR) had been submitted to Parliament as a proposed Cambridge and Oxford Railway, which would have run as a single track through Royston, Hitchin and Dunstable, but the scheme was very considerably cut back by the Lords in Parliament; there were other contenders in the field for occupation of the route. The railway as actually authorised in the Royston and Hitchin Railway Act 1846 (9 & 10 Vict. c. clxx), on 16 July 1846, was renamed the Royston and Hitchin Railway, and the Lords demanded double track for the truncated version.

The Great Northern Railway (GNR) had encouraged the Cambridge and Oxford Railway scheme (now the Royston and Hitchin Railway), and had guaranteed the shareholders 6% on paid-up capital. The GNR wanted to use the line to get access to Cambridge, and at all costs it wanted to keep the Eastern Counties Railway out. If the ECR could seize control of the R&HR it would have yet another penetrating line into GNR territory. The Eastern Counties Railway had secured the Eastern Counties (Cambridge to Bedford Railway) Act 1847 (10 & 11 Vict. c. clviii) giving approval for a Cambridge to Bedford line, and the GNR tried to get its Cambridge connection using that line, but this attempt failed too, in 1848.

Royston and Hitchin Railway Amendment (Shepreth Extension) Act 1848
- Act of Parliament
- Parliament of the United Kingdom
- Long title: An Act to enable the Royston and Hitchin Railway Company to extend their Line of Railway from Royston to Shepreth. and to make a Deviation of the authorized Line at Hitchin.
- Citation: 11 & 12 Vict. c. cxix

Dates
- Royal assent: 14 August 1848

Text of statute as originally enacted

However the Royston and Hitchin Railway had more success: on 14 August 1848 it obtained an act of Parliament, the Royston and Hitchin Railway Amendment (Shepreth Extension) Act 1848 (11 & 12 Vict. c. cxix) to extend its line from Royston to Shepreth, joining the Cambridge to Bedford branch there. If the Eastern Counties failed to construct its Cambridge to Bedford line in a reasonable time, the R&HR would have power to build the line itself.

Construction of the Royston and Hitchin Railway was not difficult and not expensive, and the 12 3/4 miles from Hitchin junction to Royston were opened on 21 October 1850. The route was hilly and the line had a series of gradients. Beyond Royston the line, still under construction, was also beset by gradients, one as steep as 1 in 100. The line served a purely agricultural district, but a connecting bus service ran between Royston and Cambridge.

There was a condition in the Eastern Counties (Cambridge to Bedford Railway) Act 1847 which forced the ECR to open its extension from Cambridge to Shepreth without any delay. The line was 5 miles 28 chains (5.35 miles, 8.61 km) in length between Shelford Junction and Shepreth, where it met the R&HR's line with an end-on design. As of July 1851, Robert Laffan reported that the Shepreth Branch Railway was complete from east of Shepreth to near Shelford railway station, creating a completed route from London to Cambridge via Hitchin. However, the Shepreth Branch Railway was only a single track and Laffan urged it to be doubled; the ability for the railway to be doubled had been incorporated into the original design.

=== 1851–1865: Completion of the railway ===
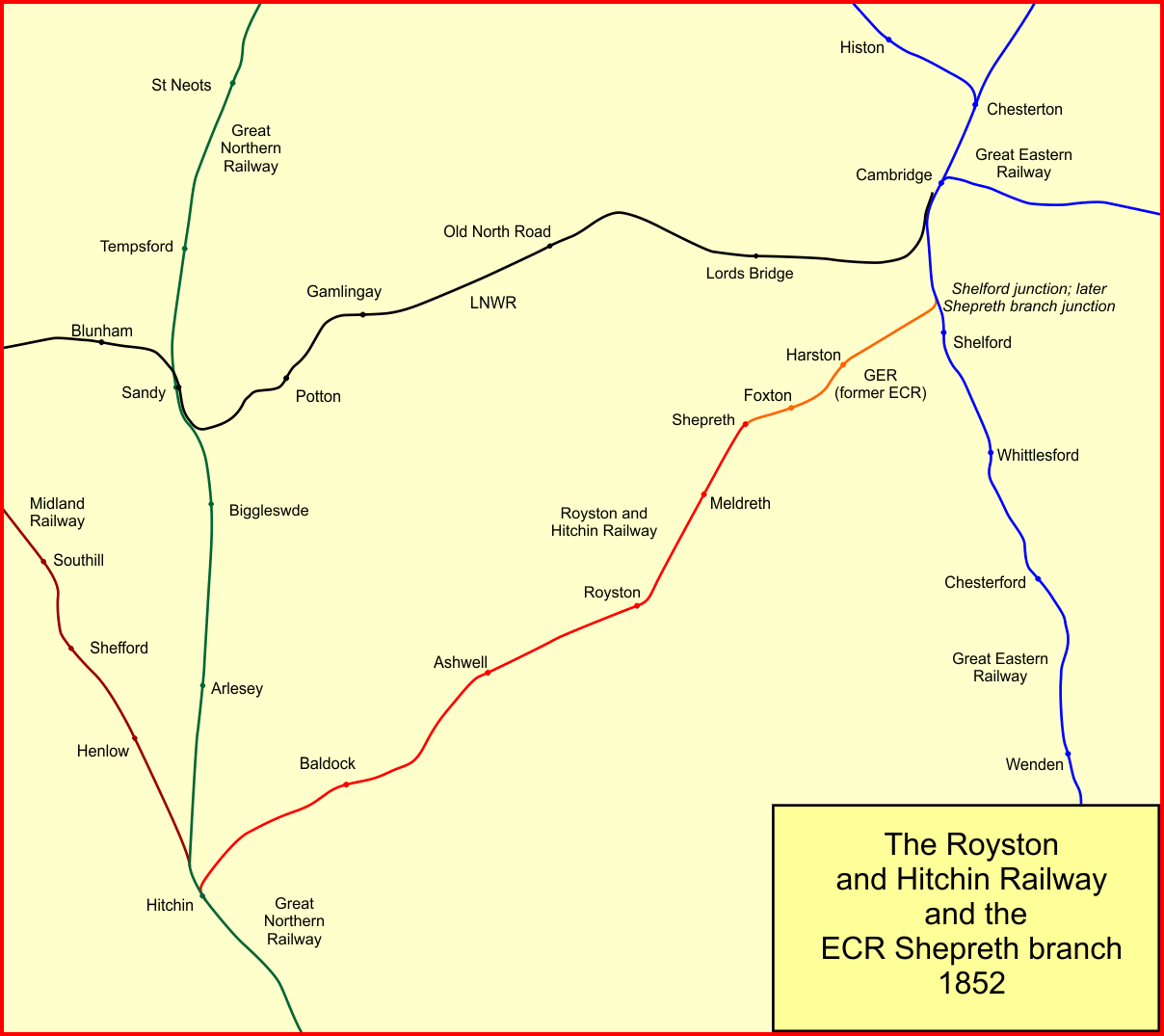
The Royston and Hitchin and the ECR Shepreth branch as of 1852

Operations began on the 5 miles 4 chains (5.05 miles, 8.13 km) extension from Royston to Shepreth on 1 August 1851. A service of five omnibuses per day was also introduced; it took 40 minutes to travel the 9 miles (14 km) route. There were still no direct trains from London King's Cross and the journey took 130 minutes at its quickest. Although the GNR's fares were lower than that of the ECR's, the service did not prove financially viable. Due to the lack of the development, the Royston and Hitchin Railway remained a purely agricultural area; the GNR was paying almost £15,000 (£1,811,000 in 2025) every year for the guarantee of operating the line without any guarantee of breaking even. The ECR's Shepreth Branch Railway opened a year later than the R&HR's line on 1 April 1852.

The Board of Trade inspecting officer only allowed the ECR to open their line on the condition that they were able to use the R&HR's turntable at Shepreth. Despite the line being owned by two different companies, through services were worked between King's Cross and Cambridge nonetheless. The ECR paid £300 (£36,000 in 2025) to the R&HR per annum in return for their use of Hitchin railway station. The ECR was always far behind on its rent to the R&HR, as was its successor the Great Eastern Railway.

During the construction of its extension to Shepreth, the ECR opened negotiations to lease the R&HR; a fourteen-year lease was agreed in February 1852 which started upon the connection of the lines at Shepreth. As part of the lease, the ECR would pay £16,000 (£1,931,000 in 2025) every year of rent and interest. The movement of the financial obligation for the R&HR to its rival was incredibly beneficial to the GNR; it agreed to pay the company 60% of any revenue it made from stations east of Ashwell & Morden from Hitchin or London King's Cross. During the tenure of the lease, the Railway Clearing House referred to the line as the "Shelford & Hitchin Railway". Three services per day were provided on the line between Hitchin and Cambridge, which was later expanded to four. There were also two trains per day on Sundays.

On 7 August 1862, the Great Eastern Railway Act 1862 (25 & 26 Vict. c. ccxxiii) received royal assent; the act amalgamated the Eastern Counties Railway with three smaller railways (the Newmarket Railway, the Eastern Union Railway, and the Norfolk Railway) to form the Great Eastern Railway (GER). This took over the responsibilities of the ECR in its ownership of the line.

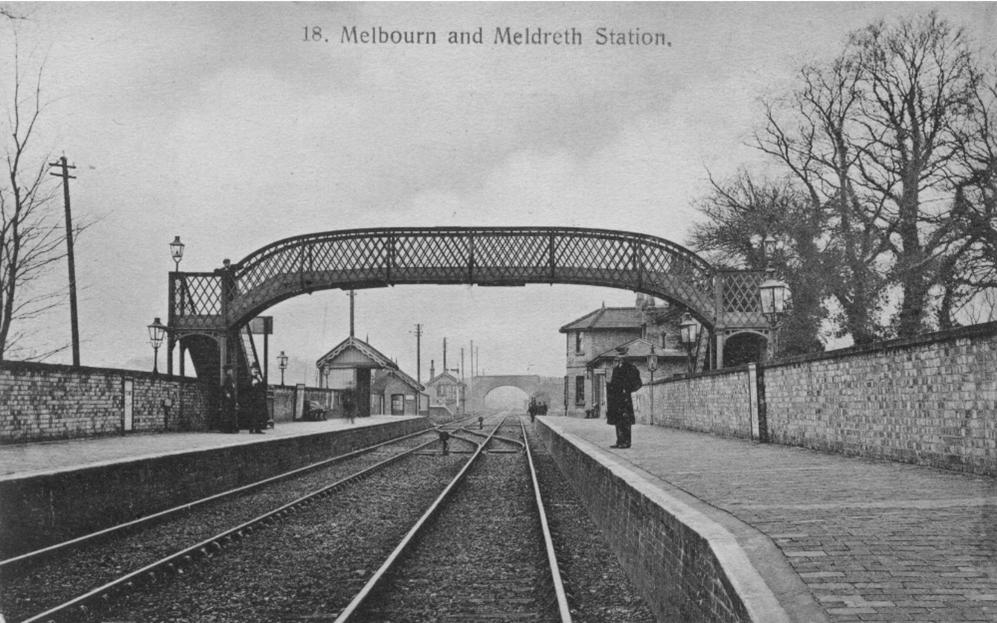
Meldreth railway station (c.1905)

Towards the end of the GNR's fourteen-year lease, the company considered purchasing the R&HR outright; however, there was opposition to this from the GER, who did not want the GNR to use their tracks all the way to Cambridge. Additionally, the Bedford–Cambridge section of the Varsity line had been opened by the Bedford and Cambridge Railway on 7 July 1862. The line was worked by the London and North Western Railway, which had a friendly relationship with the GNR at the time.

As a result, the companies brought forward two proposals to extend the railways in the area. The first involved the GNR being able to run between Shepreth and Cambridge, doubling of the track on this section of the line, the GNR being able to use the GER's station at Cambridge, and then a 1 mile (1.6 km) extension from Cambridge to a different terminal for the GNR to use. The alternative option was that the GNR built their own extension from Shepreth to the Bedford and Cambridge Railway, joining the line 1.5 miles (2.4 km) from Lord's Bridge station, and then extending that line 2 miles (3.2 km) into Cambridge over which the GNR would be able to run.

Royston and Hitchin Railway Act 1864
- Act of Parliament
- Parliament of the United Kingdom
- Long title: An Act to enable the Great Northern Railway Company to use certain Portions of the Great Eastern Railway, and to make Arrangements with the Great Eastern Railway Company.
- Citation: 27 & 28 Vict. c. cxxiv

Dates
- Royal assent: 23 June 1864

Text of statute as originally enacted

As the second proposal would render the GER's branch to Shepreth a short, useless section of railway, they agreed to the first proposal. On 2 May 1864, they signed an agreement with the GNR which would allow the company to build their extension and use the GER's track and station at Cambridge. This was enacted in the Royston and Hitchin Railway Act 1864 (27 & 28 Vict. c. cxxiv), which conceded to the GNR full running powers to Cambridge station, where all facilities and a separate platform would be provided for the GNR to use. The GER would also convert the Shepreth branch into a double-track railway capable of carrying express services, which was promised to be enacted between Shepreth and Shelford Junction by 31 March 1866, which was the last day of the lease; on this date, the R&HR line was returned to the GNR.

=== 1865–1870: Track maintenance shortcomings ===
The GER, were responsible for keeping the line well-maintained, however their poor financial health led to them failing to do so adequately. On 31 May 1865, the 7:10pm service from Cambridge derailed between Shelford Junction and Shepreth; there were no serious casualties. In December 1865 the GNR and the GER engineers made a joint inspection of the R&HR line, finding that the track bed was in a dilapidated state, and there were insufficient sleepers on the line. As a result, the GNR's engineer demanded that 11,400 sleepers should be renewed.

When the line was handed back on 1 April 1866, it was found that although the sleepers had been supplied, they had not been installed, and this responsibility was left with the GNR. Between April and July, 11 miles (18 km) of track and 5,000 new sleepers were laid. Despite this, on 3 July 1866, a fatal derailment occurred near Royston.

Captain H. W. Tyler was tasked with reporting on the causes of the derailment; he found that the track bed was built with 16 feet (4.9 m) rails, and the joints did not have fishplates. Furthermore, the sleepers were very widely spaced, and many were "in the last stages of derailment", particularly near the site of the accident, where the track geometry was described to be "wavy".

This portion of railway, which had been for some 11 years in the charge of the Great Eastern Company, was taken over, at the expiration of the agreement under which it was worked, by the Great Northern Company, on the 1st April [1865]. I learn from the engineer of the Great Northern Railway that he inspected it, with the engineer of the Great Eastern Company, in December 1865, and that he then required that 11,400 new sleepers should be inserted in the permanent way; but this not having been done, the same number of new sleepers were handed over to the Great Northern Company, with the line, in April. Out of 18 miles of double or 36 miles of single line thus taken over, 11 miles have since been re-laid with fished joints. [...] I am glad to learn also that [...] the re-laying of the whole 18 miles may be completed in 12 weeks from the present time [...] Orders have wisely been given to slacken the speed of the trains pending the completion of this re-laying; and the posts have been erected, and wires strained, for providing telegraphic communication, which, strange to say, had not previously been supplied.

— Captain H. W. Tyler, Report on the Derailment that Occurred near Royston on 3rd July 1866.

The poor quality of the GER section between Shepreth and Shelford Junction went far beyond the poor track layout; the section had not been doubled as promised, and there was no accommodation provided at Cambridge, where there was no shelter for GNR passengers either. The contractors for these works, W. Bell & Sons, ceased delivering the project when the GER was unable to pay them. Instead, the GNR paid £5,000 (£618000 today) for the work; they also provided their own staff at Cambridge to make up for the GER's shortcomings. Doubling the line between Shelford Junction and Shepreth was completed early in May 1867, and the electric telegraph system was working between Hitchin and Cambridge a few months afterwards.

=== 1870–1910: Competition and absorption ===
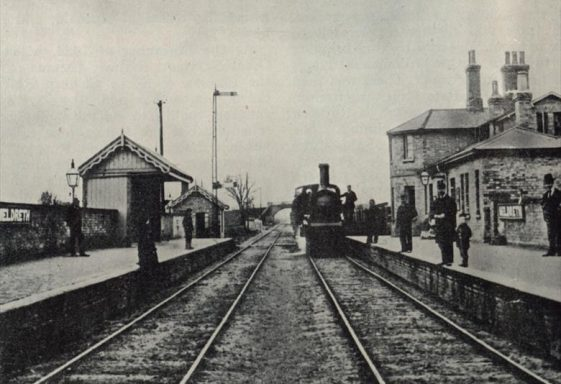
Meldreth railway station (c.1880)

Slip carriages were first used on the line in the August 1872 timetable. These were useful as they allowed for faster journey times with more stops; this would allow the GNR to compete more effectively against the GER's alternative route.

As the GNR were already responsible for maintaining the western portion of the line between Hitchin and Shepreth, it was agreed that the GER would pay for the GNR to maintain the rest of the route between Shepreth and Shelford Junction. The agreement lasted 21 years from 1 January 1874; the GER paid £320 per annum in return. Between 1874 and 1878, the GNR resignalled the entire line, in order to install the signalling block system. Signal boxes were built at Letchworth (although there was no station there at the time), Baldock, Ashwell, Royston, Meldreth, Shepreth, Harston, and Foxton, of which the latter two were paid for by the GER. The GER also paid for the improvement of Shelford junction. As part of the works, new sidings were installed at Baldock. The project was delivered by Saxby & Farmer and finished by April 1878.

Competition with the GER led to mounting pressure for faster journey times; in summer 1880, the GNR ran a midday express service which reached Kings Cross in 75 minutes. The service stopped only at Hitchin, making it one of the only services to not stop at Finsbury Park. In contrast, the fastest service towards Cambridge took 80 minutes. However, despite further attempts to improve journey times, by 1898 it was no longer possible to compete with the GER between London and Cambridge. Instead, the GNR decided to concentrate on developing passenger numbers at intermediate stops, rather than specifically from Cambridge itself.

Great Northern Railway Act 1897
- Act of Parliament
- Parliament of the United Kingdom
- Long title: An Act to confer further powers upon the Great Northern Railway Company with respect to their own and other undertakings to provide for the incorporation of a Joint Committee of the Great Northern Railway Company and the Manchester Sheffield and Lincolnshire Railway Company the vesting in that Committee of an authorised Passenger Station at Nottingham and for other purposes.
- Citation: 60 & 61 Vict. c. xl

Dates
- Royal assent: 3 June 1897

Status: Amended

Text of statute as originally enacted

The GNR officially acquired the Royston and Hitchin Railway on 3 June 1897 by means of the Great Northern Railway Act 1897 (60 & 61 Vict. c. xl). This came into effect on 1 July 1897, bringing the line under single ownership and management for the first time in its existence.

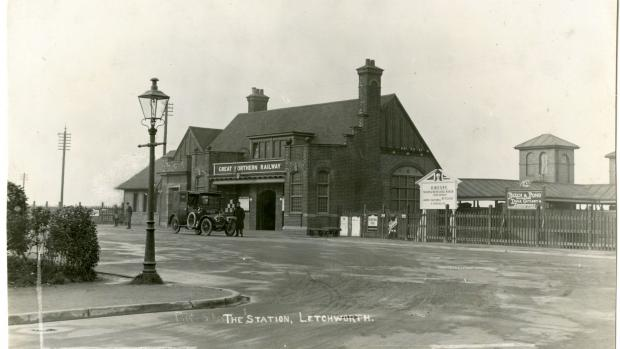
Letchworth railway station in 1920

Sir Ebenezer Howard's 1898 book "Tomorrow a Peaceful Path to Real Reform" detailed his proposal of a garden city; that is, a self-sufficient town designed in a circular pattern, with a large park at the centre. In the book, he presents his ideal garden city being surrounded by a circular goods railway, with a mainline railway running through the centre. Furthermore, he includes the railway as one of the mechanisms by which the town would raise revenue, both by means of goods and passengers.

As a result of Howard's work, the first garden city was founded at Letchworth in 1903. At first, construction workers made use of a wooden halt on the line; regular passenger services were provided from 1905. A goods depot was added on 19 August 1907, and a permanent station on 18 May 1913. The station originally had two island platforms, but only the centre two tracks were used. This has since been reduced to two platforms. A second garden city was also founded at Welwyn in 1920; its railway station is situated on the East Coast Main Line, making it also part of the Great Northern route.

=== 1910–1965: Grouping and decline ===
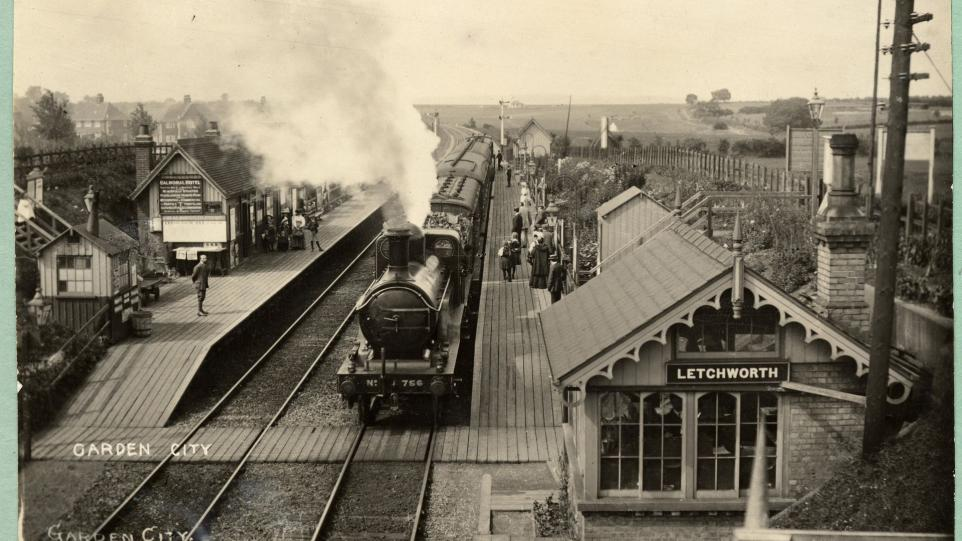
Letchworth railway station in 1910.

Hostility between the Great Northern Railway and the Great Eastern Railway cooled in the twentieth century, with GNR withdrawn from Cambridge station in July 1912. However, four GNR engines were still based there, and there were still five or six fast trains each way between King's Cross and Cambridge. Foxton was linked to a cement works near Barrington by a short branch line sanctioned by a light railway order of 1920.

During World War I (1914–1918), the government took control of all the railways in order to use them for the war effort. In an attempt to stem the losses of the 120 extant railway companies at the time, the government enacted the Railways Act 1921, which grouped the railways into four large companies, which were dubbed the "Big Four". Both the GNR and GER became part of the London and North Eastern Railway (LNER), which was the second largest of these companies. This meant that both routes between Cambridge and London were under the same ownership, ending the competition between the two lines.

In May 1932, the LNER introduced five daily 'Garden Cities Expresses', which took 82 minutes to run from London to Cambridge and 77 minutes to return. These were soon renamed to the 'Cambridge Buffet Expresses', and from July 1932 they were accelerated to 72 and 72 minutes respectively. The popularity of the service was largely derived from Letchworth's status as an alcohol-free town, which led residents to use the train as a pub. The service was suspended at the outbreak of World War II in 1939, but was reinstated on 6 December 1948, with four daily services in times of 82–90 minutes. In the pre-war years the original three-coach formations had on occasion to be strengthened to as many as nine or ten coaches.

The Transport Act 1947 merged the Big Four into a single nationalised operator under the ownership of the British Transport Commission's Railway Executive, which traded as British Railways. This meant the Cambridge line was owned by the British Transport Commission, the fourth time the ownership of the line had changed hands.

Situated between Foxton and Cambridge, Harston railway station had served the villages of Harston and Hauxton since it opened with the rest of the line in 1852. A victim of the Beeching Axe, it was closed to passengers in 1963, and goods traffic continued until 1964. A feasibility study to re-open the station was carried out in 1996 but rejected by South Cambridgeshire District Council. In 2021 Anthony Browne, the MP for South Cambridgeshire at the time, called for the station to be reopened, saying that "Installing a small new station on an existing line should be straightforward and cause minimal disruption". The proposal did not materialise in any form, and no other attempts to reopen the station have been made since.

=== 1965–1996: Revitalisation and electrification ===
The towns on the line have seen significant growth, in particular Letchworth, Baldock, and Royston. For example, the population of Letchworth grew from 10,302 in 1921 to 29,760 in 1971, and is currently at 33,990 as of 2021. Furthermore, many of its industries have developed with the railway; in 1965 Letchworth despatched 64,197 tons of freight in full wagon loads and 8,554 in smaller consignments. The station also issued 151,295 ordinary and 2,795 season tickets the same year.

During the 1970s, British Rail focussed their electrification efforts on the Great Northern suburban services. Electrification reached Welwyn Garden City and Hertford North on 3 November 1976, and as far as Stevenage on 6 February 1978. The Cambridge Line was chosen for electrification in 1978, primarily because it allowed an alternative electrified route to London while essential upgrade works were carried out on the West Anglia Main Line. However, electrification was not pursued further than Royston as it was not considered value-for-money to electrify as far as Cambridge. However this meant that the through service was severed in February 1978; passengers had to change from the electrified service at Royston to a diesel train service to Cambridge. In early 1978 ten sidings and a carriage washing plant were added 3/4 mile (1.2 km) east of Letchworth.

British Rail had originally subdivided its services by region, including the Eastern region, which the Cambridge line had been part of. However, in 1982 sectorisation split operations by traffic type, and the line fell under the Great Northern subdivision of London & South East, which was rebranded as Network SouthEast in 1986. It was expected that Network SouthEast would cover its costs from revenue in contrast to rural services, which were heavily subsidised. In 1987, the regions—which still existed for administrative purposes—saw boundary changes in which Meldreth was the new boundary between the Eastern and Anglia regions. On 4 March 1987, approval was given by Network SouthEast for the extension of electrification as far as Cambridge; electric operation commenced on 16 May 1988.

=== 1996–present: Privatisation ===
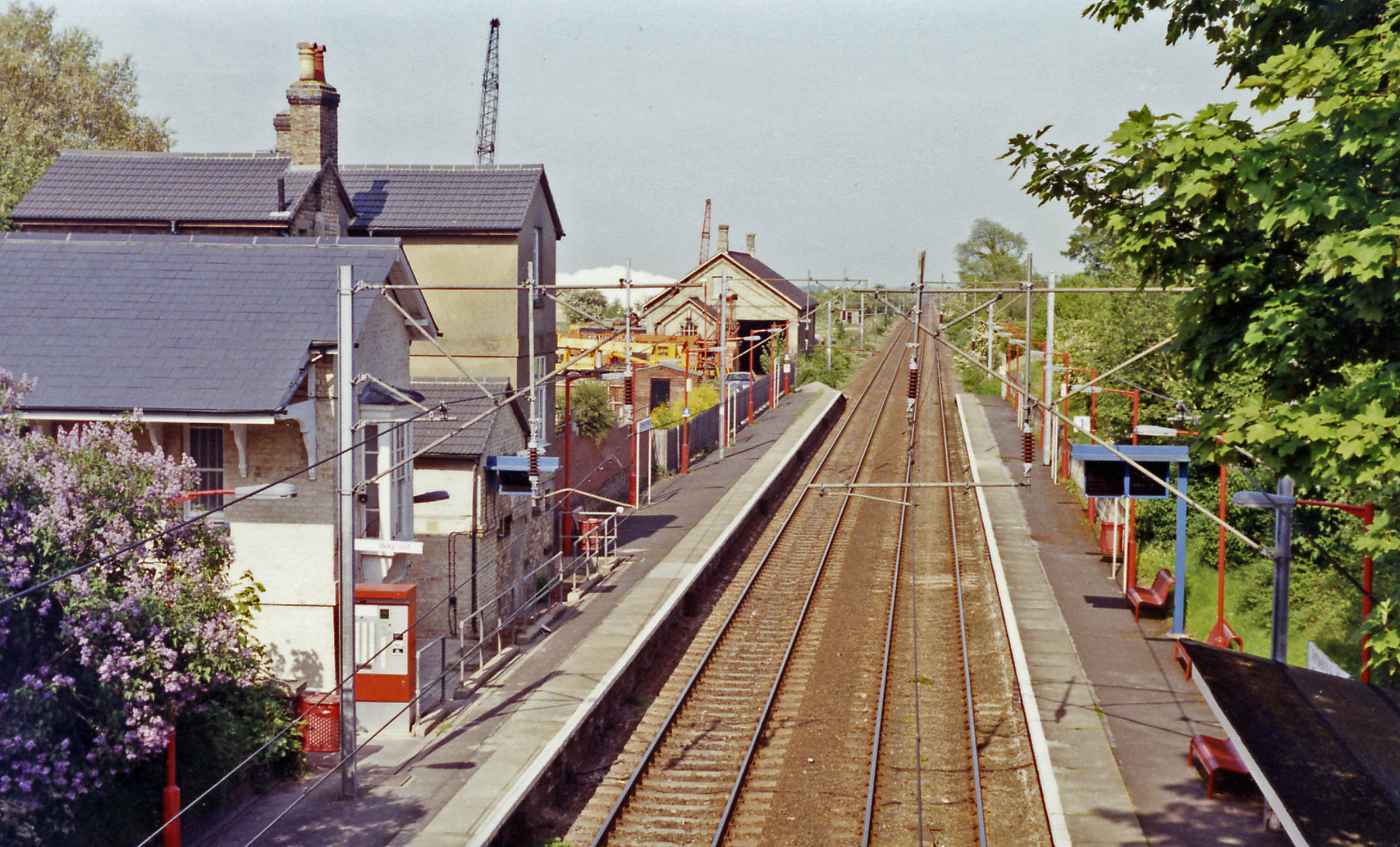
Ashwell & Morden station

On 7 December 1996, it was announced that Prism Rail had won the West Anglia Great Northern franchise, which allowed them to operate the services on the line until 2004. The Great Northern section of the franchise was extended until 2006.

On 13 December 2005, the Department for Transport awarded the new franchise to FirstGroup, with the services operated by Thameslink and West Anglia Great Northern transferring to First Capital Connect on 1 April 2006. In December 2011, the DfT announced that all services operated by First Capital Connect would be included within the new Thameslink, Southern and Great Northern franchise. Their franchise was extended twice, ending on 13 September 2014.

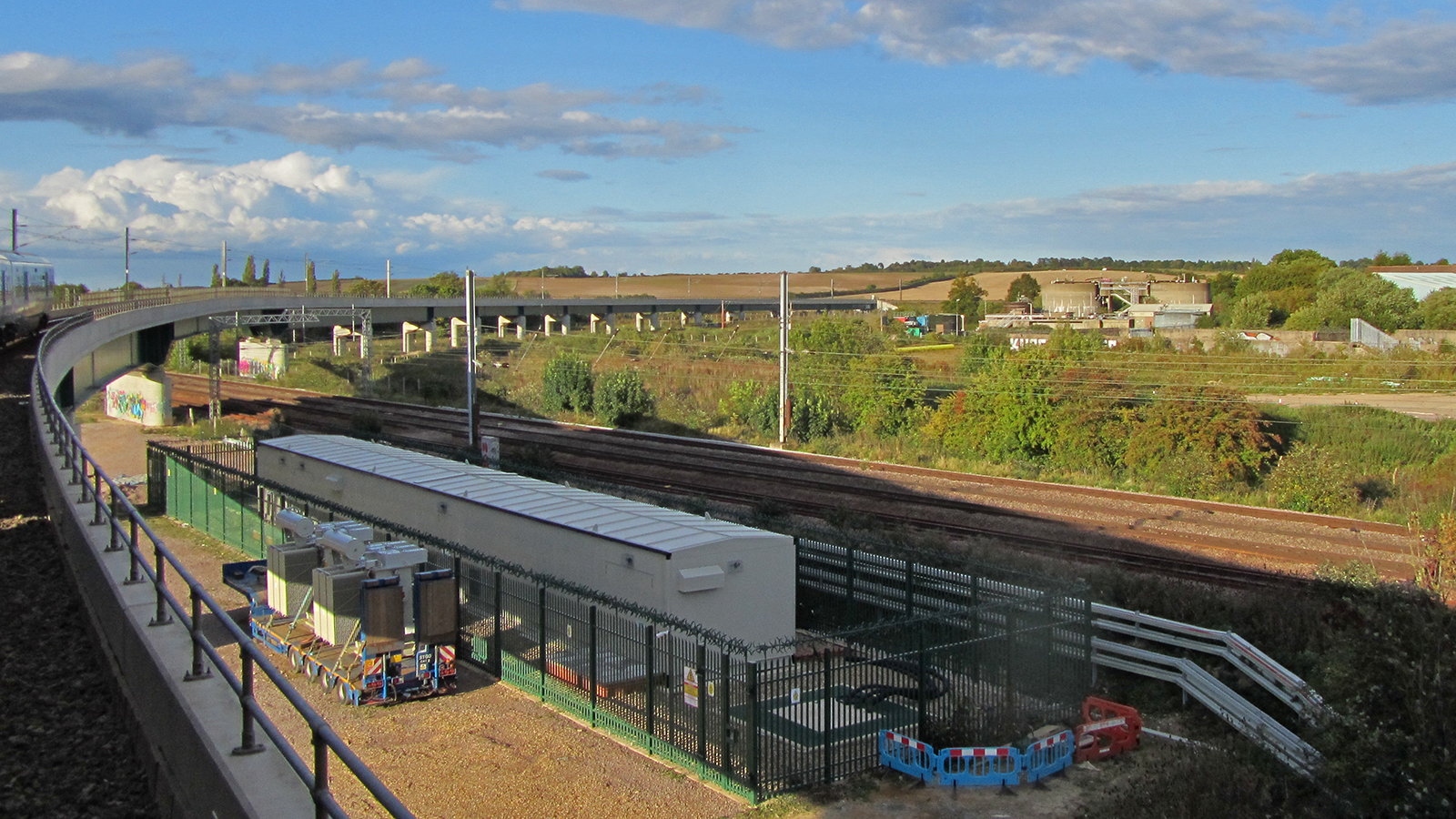
The Hitchin Flyover as viewed by a Down Cambridge Flyover train using it.

The Hitchin Flyover to the north of the existing junction was opened in 2013 to grade-separate the northbound Down Cambridge Flyover track, preventing conflicting movements with southbound services on the ECML. However, the alleviation of this bottleneck has done little to increase service frequency due to the continued bottleneck of the Digswell Viaduct between Welwyn Garden City and Welwyn North.

In 2014, the newly created Thameslink, Southern and Great Northern franchise was awarded to Govia Thameslink Railway, with the handover of services occurring on 14 September. Their franchise agreement included connecting Cambridge to the Thameslink route via the Canal Tunnels; these services started on May 20, 2018. On 30 June 2015, the Barrington Freight branch was reopened, the track having been re-laid and re-ballasted. The branch connects to the line by a junction west of Foxton railway station. During the 2025 Christmas holiday season, the railways around Cambridge were closed for 11 days to allow for the signalling system to be upgraded. The former signalling was built in the 1960s or 1970s.

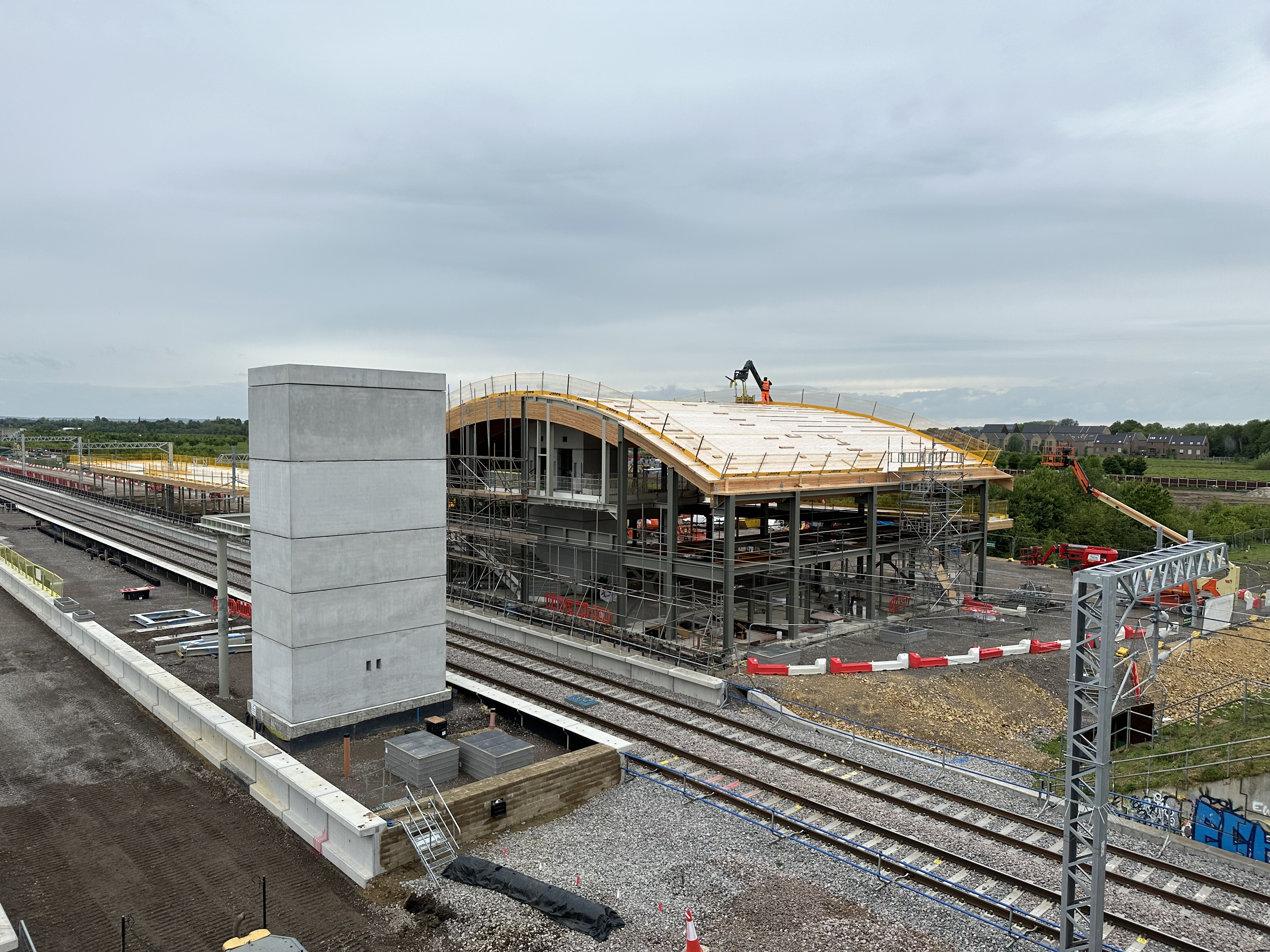
Cambridge South under construction in 2024.

A station to the south of Cambridge was first proposed in 2017, and although its application to New Stations Fund 2 that year was unsuccessful, the November 2017 budget allocated it £5 million in funding. The station, called Cambridge South, is situated between Foxton and Cambridge, and serves the Cambridge Biomedical Campus and the wider Trumpington area. The station opened on 28 June 2026, having been delayed twice from the originally proposed date of late 2025. It is managed by Greater Anglia, with services also run by Great Northern, Thameslink, and CrossCountry.

=== Future ===
Both Cambridge South and Cambridge stations are to be served by East West Rail, the Bedford–Cambridge section of which is in detailed planning as of 2025. The current plan for the route will include a grade-separated junction with the line at Hauxton, between Foxton and Cambridge. This will include improvements to Hauxton level crossing. East West Rail confirmed in their 2021 consultation that the Cambridge line will remain double-tracked between this junction and Shepreth Junction, where the line will be quadrupled to run alongside the West Anglia Main Line as far as Cambridge.

== Route description ==
The Cambridge Line diverges off the East Coast Main Line at Cambridge Junction north of Hitchin, heading north-east until Shepreth Branch Junction, where it meets the West Anglia Main Line south of Cambridge South. The line is 23 miles 15 chains (23.19 miles, 37.32 km) in length, and serves nine stations, as well as having one disused station at Harston.

An alternative route between London and Cambridge also exists in the form of the West Anglia Main Line from Liverpool Street, with trains operated by Greater Anglia. The Cambridge line has provided faster journey times than the West Anglia Main Line despite its longer length, both historically and in the modern day.

All stations on the line have two tracks and two platforms, with the exception of Hitchin (two platforms facing four tracks), Cambridge South (four platforms), and Cambridge (eight platforms). The line forms part of the Network Rail Strategic Route 5 and is classified as a London and South East Commuter line.

=== Infrastructure ===
The flat junction at Hitchin, which trains used to use to access the line from the East Coast Main Line, is a historic bottleneck. The Hitchin Flyover to the north of the existing junction was opened in 2013 to grade-separate the northbound Down Cambridge Flyover track, preventing conflicting movements with southbound services on the ECML.

Traction current is supplied at 25 kV AC using overhead line equipment overseen by York Electrical Control Room, with Neutral Sections at Cambridge junction, Litlington and Shepreth Branch Junction. It has a loading gauge of W8 and a maximum line speed of 90 mph (140 km/h).

Just under a mile to the east of Royston station lies the boundary between the Network Rail London North Eastern Route and Anglia Route. All signals between King's Cross and this point are controlled by Kings Cross Power Signal Box, whilst those from here to Cambridge are controlled by Cambridge Signal Box. The signalling system for the whole Cambridge line is Track Circuit block.

=== Stations ===
Cambridge line stations from south to north
| Photograph | Station name | Opened | Distance from London King's Cross | Coordinates |
|---|---|---|---|---|
| | Hitchin | 7 August 1850 | 34 miles 50 chains (34.63 miles, 55.72 km) | 51.95306°N 0.26319°W |
| | Letchworth Garden City | 15 April 1905 (Note: The station first opened in 1903 as a workers' halt; this date is when it first received a passenger service (see Addition of Letchworth)) | 34 miles 50 chains (34.63 miles, 55.72 km) | 51.98021°N 0.22941°W |
| | Baldock | 21 October 1850 | 36 miles 47 chains (36.59 miles, 58.88 km) | 51.99305°N 0.18668°W |
| | Ashwell and Morden | 21 October 1850 | 41 miles 00 chains (41.00 miles, 65.98 km) | 52.03085°N 0.10925°W |
| | Royston | 21 October 1850 | 44 miles 70 chains (44.88 miles, 72.22 km) | 52.05312°N 0.02763°W |
| | Meldreth | 1 August 1851 | 47 miles 75 chains (47.94 miles, 77.15 km) | 52.090929°N 0.00924°E |
| | Shepreth | 1 August 1851 | 49 miles 67 chains (49.84 miles, 80.21 km) | 52.11462°N 0.03219°E |
| | Foxton | 1 August 1852 | 50 miles 77 chains (50.96 miles, 82.02 km) | 52.11940°N 0.05721°E |
| | Cambridge South | 28 June 2026 | 56 miles 31 chains (56.39 miles, 90.75 km) | 52.17387°N 0.13131°E |
| | Cambridge | 29 July 1845 | 57 miles 72 chains (57.90 miles, 93.18 km) | 52.19414°N 0.13775°E |

Harston railway station was situated between Foxton and Cambridge. It opened in 1852 and closed in 1963 as part of the Beeching Axe.

==== Timeline ====
Open on the Cambridge line
Open on a different line
Open only as a goods station
Open only as a workers' halt
Hitchin
Letchworth Garden City
Baldock
Ashwell and Morden
Royston
Meldreth
Shepreth
Foxton
Harston
Cambridge South
Cambridge
│
1825
│
1850
│
1875
│
1900
│
1925
│
1950
│
1975
│
2000
│
2025
│
2050
Cambridge line stations, 1845–2026

=== Route map ===
The route of the Cambridge line

== Services ==
All services on the line are operated by Thameslink and Great Northern, both parts of Greater Thameslink Railway with the line forming part of the Great Northern route. A mix of stopping, semi-fast, and express services operate, with some trains between London Kings Cross and King's Lynn not stopping at all on the line. All Thameslink services have been operated using their Class 700 Desiro City units since February 2018, as part of the Thameslink programme. There are up to 8 trains per hour on the line between Cambridge and Brighton during peak times. The majority of Great Northern services are operated with Class 387 Electrostar units. Great Northern also introduced Class 379s for their services to Letchworth in February 2025, which will replace some Class 387 units to allow them to be transferred to Southern.

=== Passenger volume ===
Below are the passenger usage statistics on the National Rail network from 1 April 2002 to 31 March 2025. All stations have seen large increases in their passenger volumes, for example Cambridge having 71% more passengers in 2022 than it did in 2002.

Station usage
| Station name | 2002–03 | 2004–05 | 2005–06 | 2006–07 | 2007–08 | 2008–09 | 2009–10 | 2010–11 | 2011–12 | 2012–13 | 2013–14 | 2014–15 | 2015–16 | 2016–17 | 2017–18 | 2018–19 | 2019–20 | 2020–21 | 2021–22 | 2022–23 | 2023–24 | 2024–25 |
|---|---|---|---|---|---|---|---|---|---|---|---|---|---|---|---|---|---|---|---|---|---|---|
| Cambridge | 5,478,112 | 6,060,475 | 6,137,423 | 6,522,309 | 6,997,887 | 7,571,838 | 7,661,146 | 8,245,416 | 8,823,236 | 9,168,938 | 9,824,859 | 10,420,178 | 10,954,212 | 11,424,902 | 11,530,158 | 11,983,320 | 11,599,814 | 2,300,528 | 6,952,780 | 9,341,600 | 10,033,088 | 10,597,572 |
| Foxton | 48,874 | 53,538 | 54,088 | 64,685 | 63,418 | 76,898 | 72,072 | 76,860 | 83,364 | 87,974 | 87,164 | 94,080 | 88,236 | 92,908 | 102,170 | 101,990 | 105,404 | 30,564 | 75,252 | 87,794 | 94,124 | 98,982 |
| Shepreth | 41,996 | 48,622 | 56,747 | 76,382 | 75,052 | 75,704 | 79,104 | 83,524 | 82,422 | 86,304 | 92,146 | 105,802 | 105,852 | 110,756 | 114,294 | 115,600 | 117,102 | 23,676 | 68,718 | 91,082 | 98,754 | 109,514 |
| Meldreth | 140,494 | 157,409 | 167,751 | 195,567 | 213,562 | 216,990 | 205,836 | 198,626 | 204,582 | 221,774 | 243,646 | 267,218 | 278,044 | 269,934 | 307,868 | 295,470 | 305,888 | 82,016 | 181,362 | 217,158 | 230,482 | 245,846 |
| Royston | 935,438 | 1,026,983 | 1,060,800 | 1,079,220 | 1,147,905 | 1,155,024 | 1,112,974 | 1,193,950 | 1,217,514 | 1,229,092 | 1,300,508 | 1,394,104 | 1,434,684 | 1,483,338 | 1,477,616 | 1,467,154 | 1,435,616 | 289,662 | 835,428 | 1,081,014 | 1,272,012 | 1,415,838 |
| Ashwell and Morden | 89,061 | 98,481 | 96,452 | 108,013 | 104,417 | 116,908 | 112,350 | 115,720 | 130,196 | 119,042 | 131,148 | 138,638 | 144,158 | 150,384 | 152,372 | 156,490 | 159,254 | 34,748 | 104,212 | 140,696 | 146,024 | 173,122 |
| Baldock | 331,732 | 377,278 | 386,350 | 427,635 | 419,784 | 473,396 | 455,724 | 496,896 | 517,036 | 535,106 | 568,182 | 623,898 | 658,208 | 648,738 | 653,280 | 637,664 | 654,320 | 154,004 | 387,170 | 502,586 | 527,306 | 568,602 |
| Letchworth Garden City | 1,091,229 | 1,144,661 | 1,186,565 | 1,309,067 | 1,364,936 | 1,445,886 | 1,366,714 | 1,447,418 | 1,513,292 | 1,569,410 | 1,652,253 | 1,751,820 | 1,861,902 | 1,890,116 | 1,900,970 | 1,856,558 | 1,834,720 | 457,590 | 1,189,236 | 1,471,004 | 1,598,310 | 1,779,634 |
| Hitchin | 1,806,889 | 1,948,003 | 2,049,217 | 2,368,121 | 2,543,526 | 2,569,494 | 2,478,832 | 2,594,012 | 2,641,482 | 2,764,232 | 2,902,568 | 3,035,692 | 3,199,352 | 3,213,416 | 3,237,936 | 3,265,142 | 3,233,772 | 750,478 | 1,981,466 | 2,512,254 | 2,682,410 | 2,940,178 |
The annual passenger usage is based on sales of tickets in stated financial years from Office of Rail and Road estimates of station usage. The statistics are for passengers arriving and departing from each station and cover twelve-month periods that start in April. Methodology may vary year on year. Usage since the period 2019–20 have been affected by the COVID-19 pandemic, especially the period 2020–23.

== Gallery ==
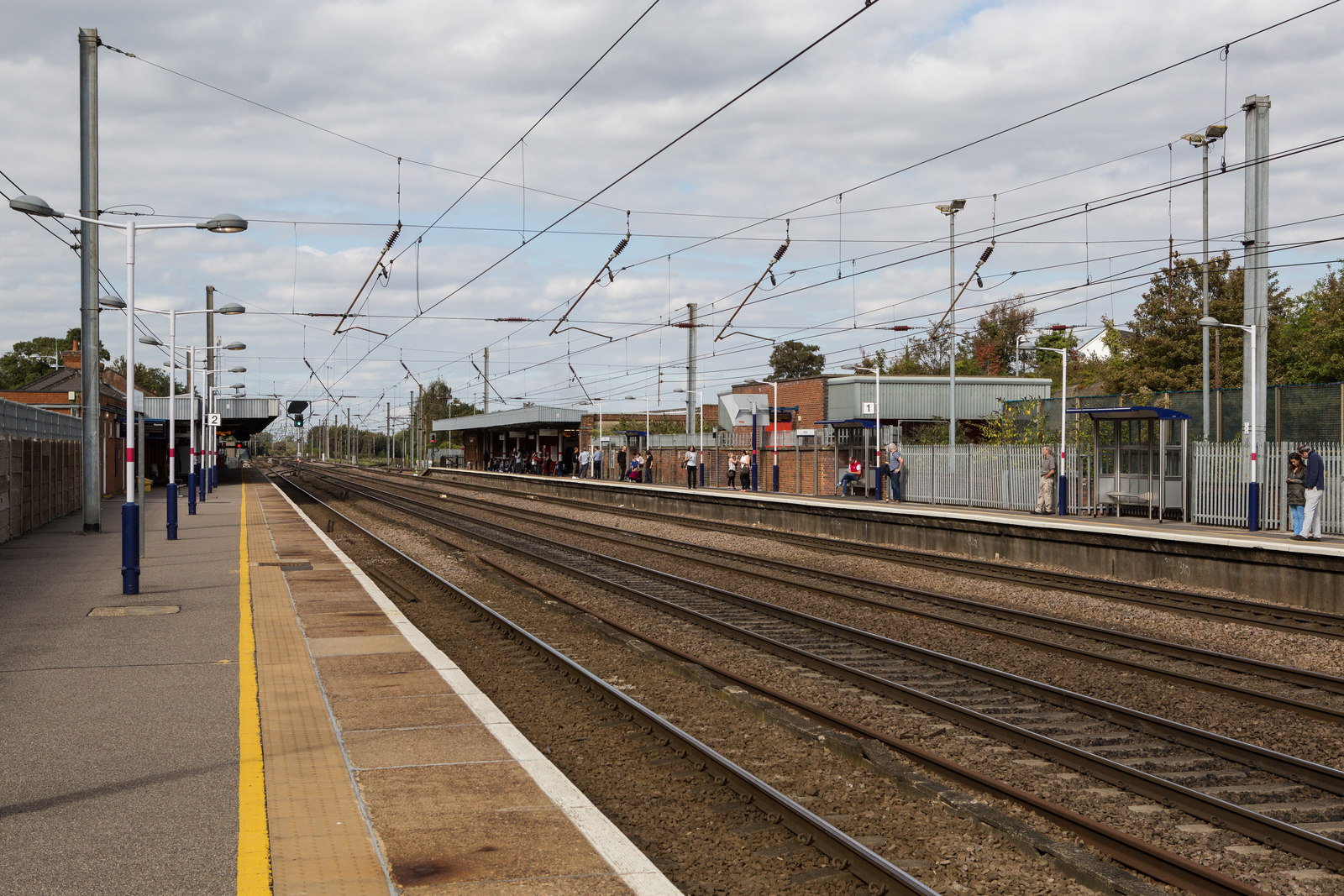
Hitchin railway station

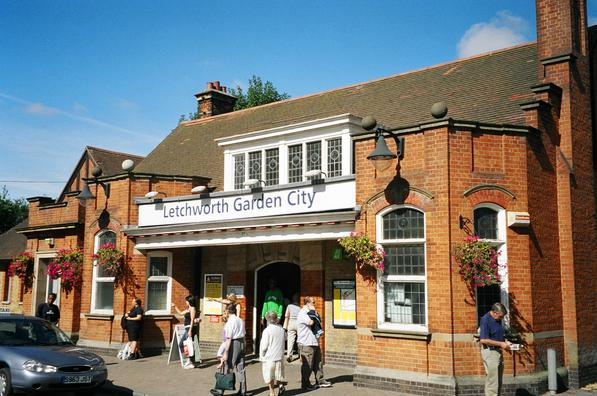
Letchworth Garden City's station building

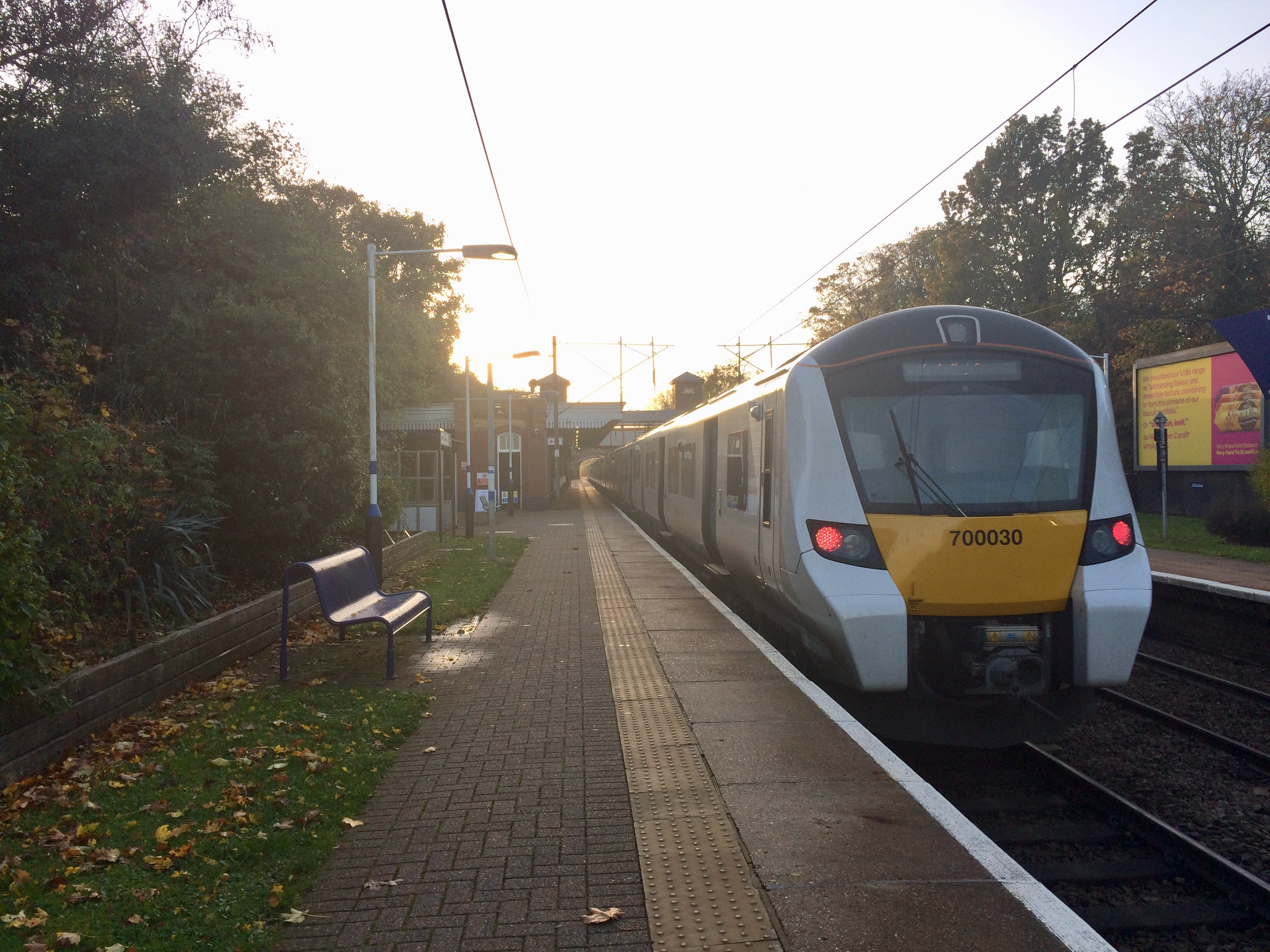
A Class 700 at Letchworth railway station

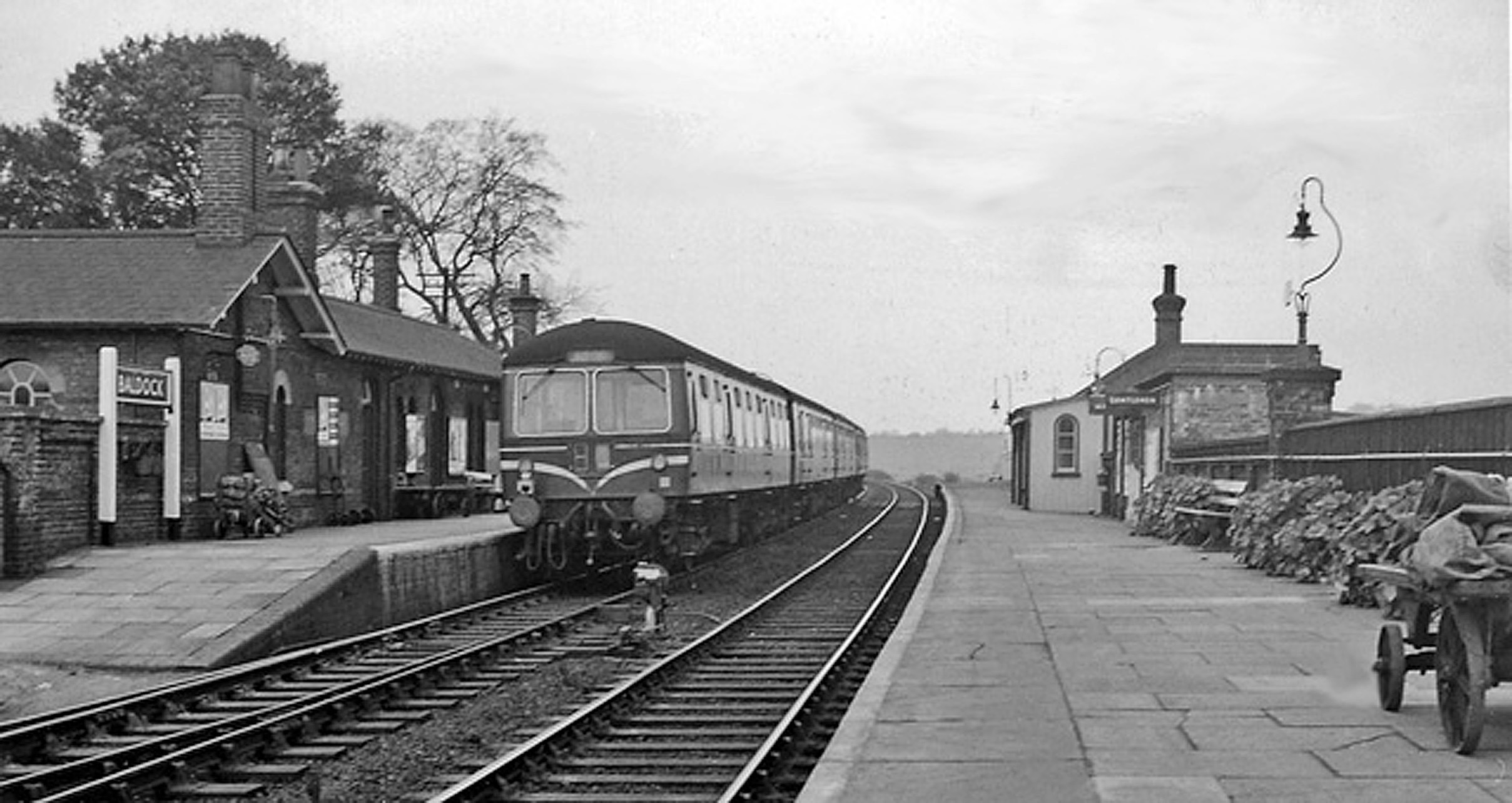
Baldock railway station in 1961

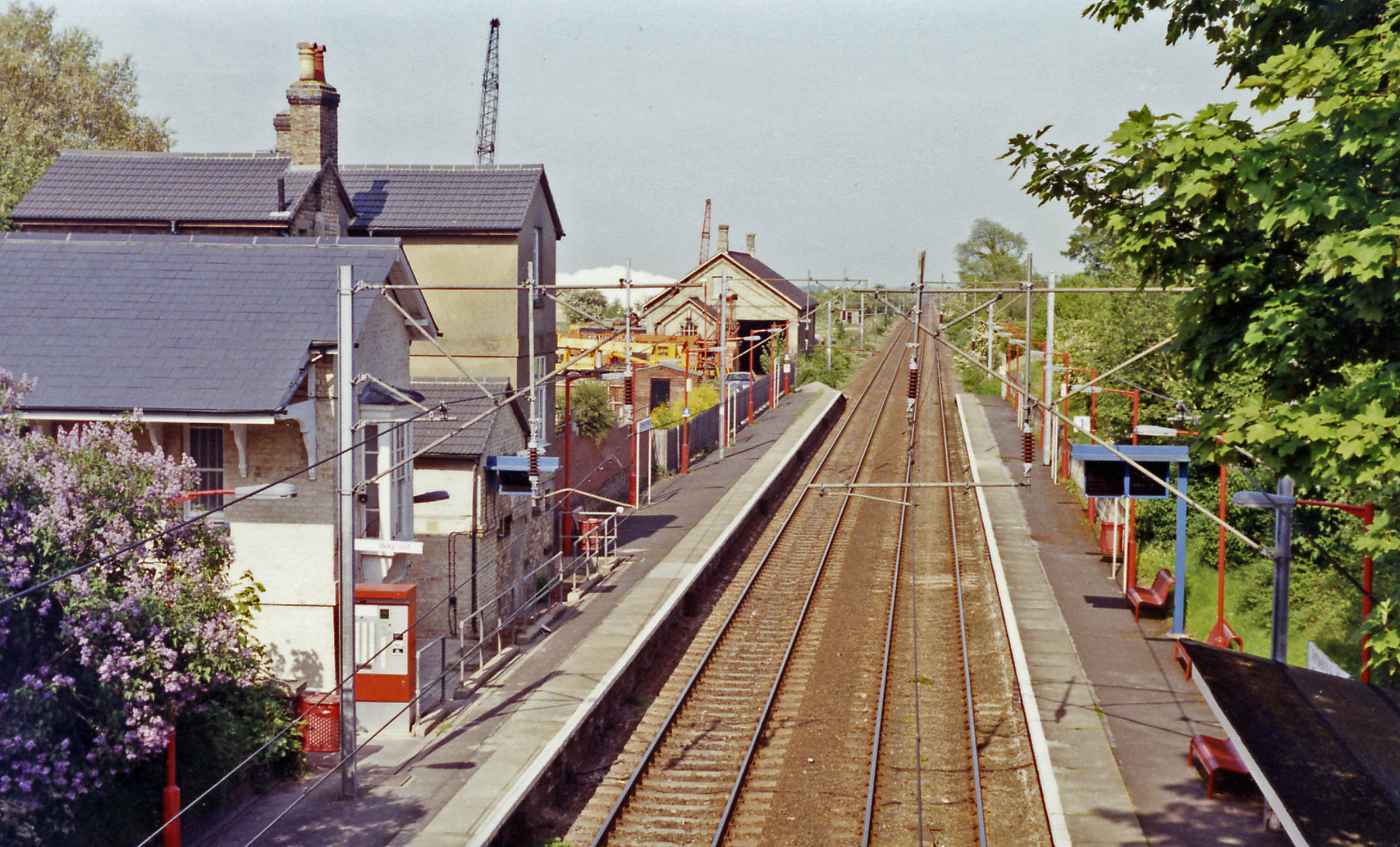
Ashwell & Morden railway station

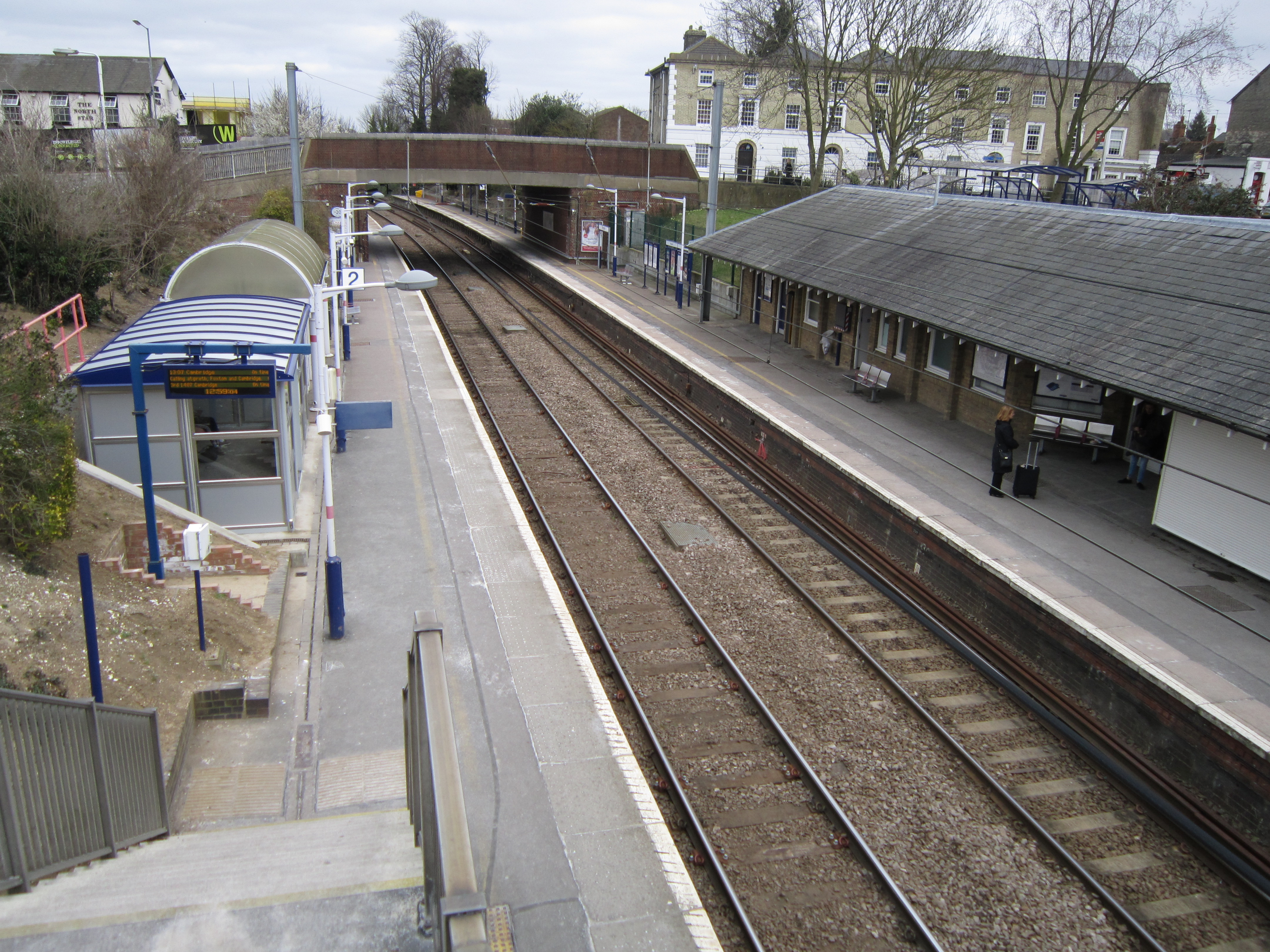
Royston railway station

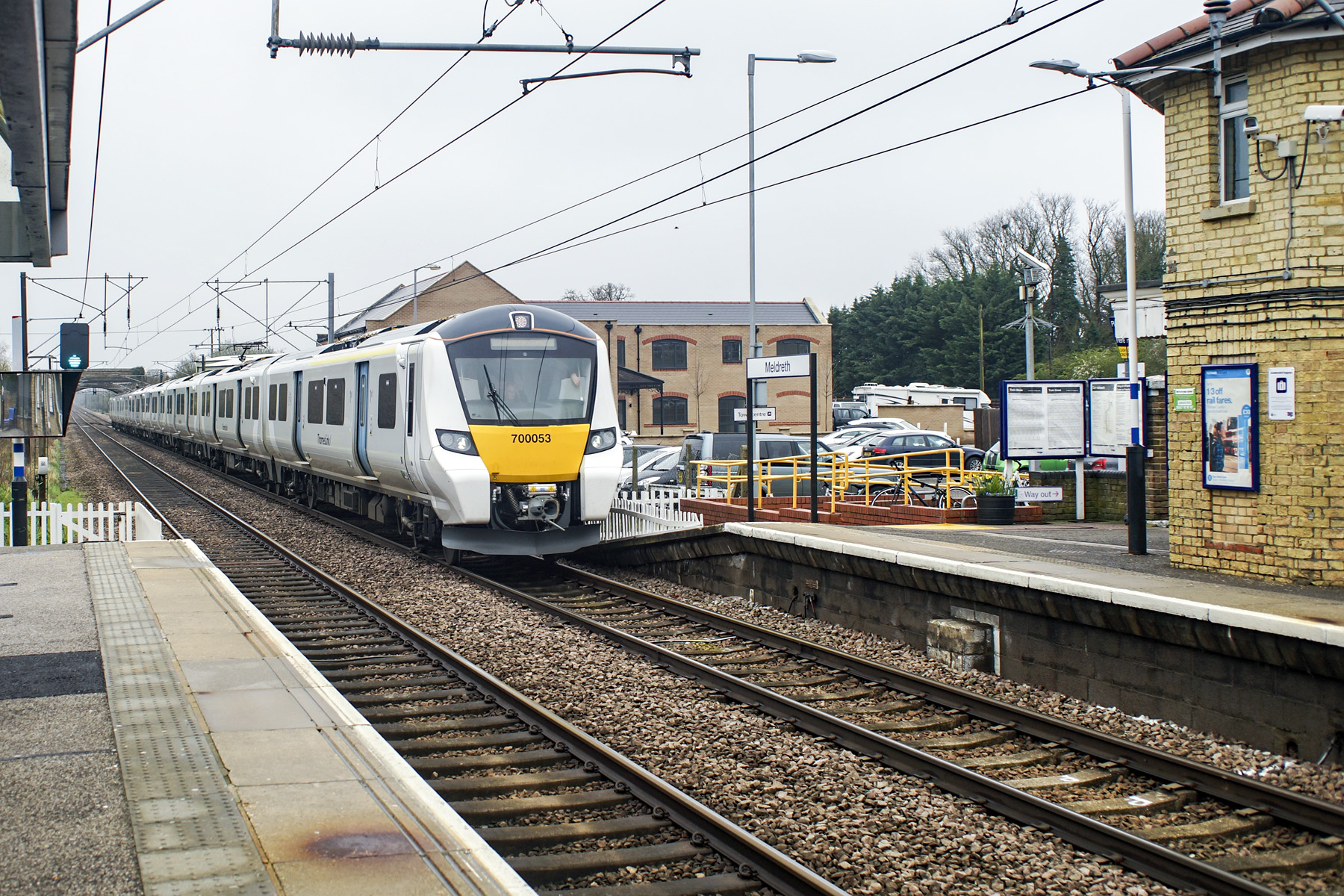
A Class 700 at Meldreth railway station

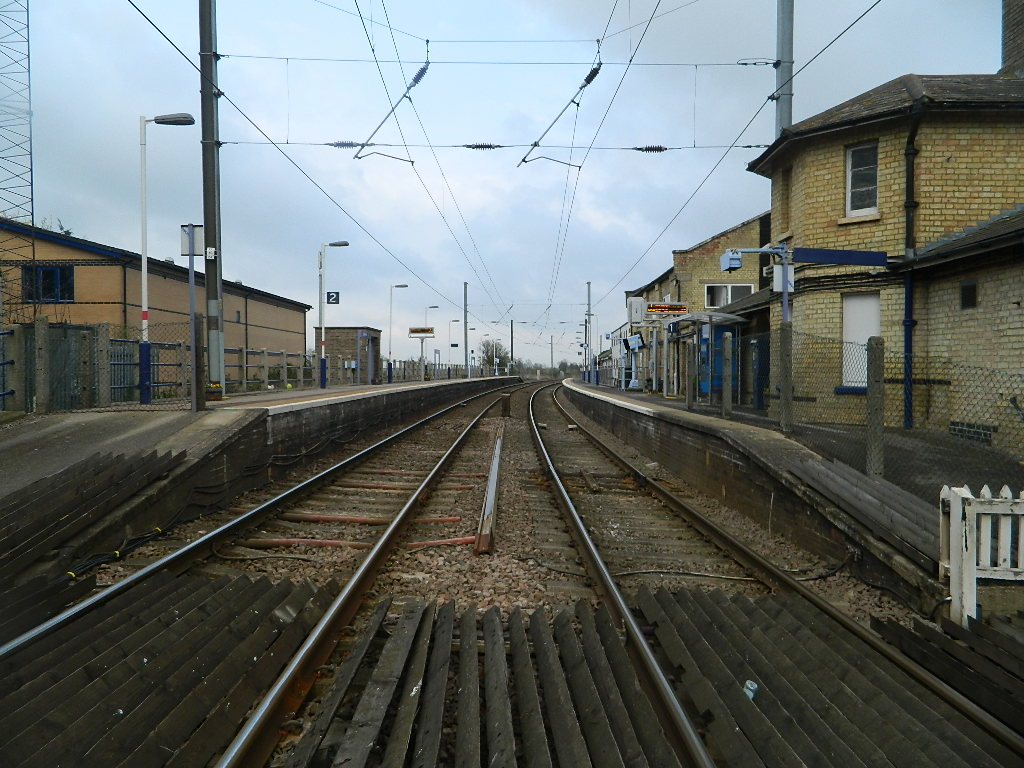
Shepreth railway station as viewed from its level crossing.

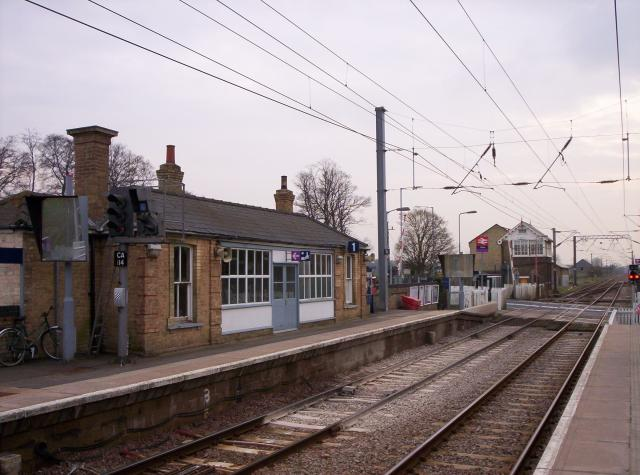
Foxton railway station

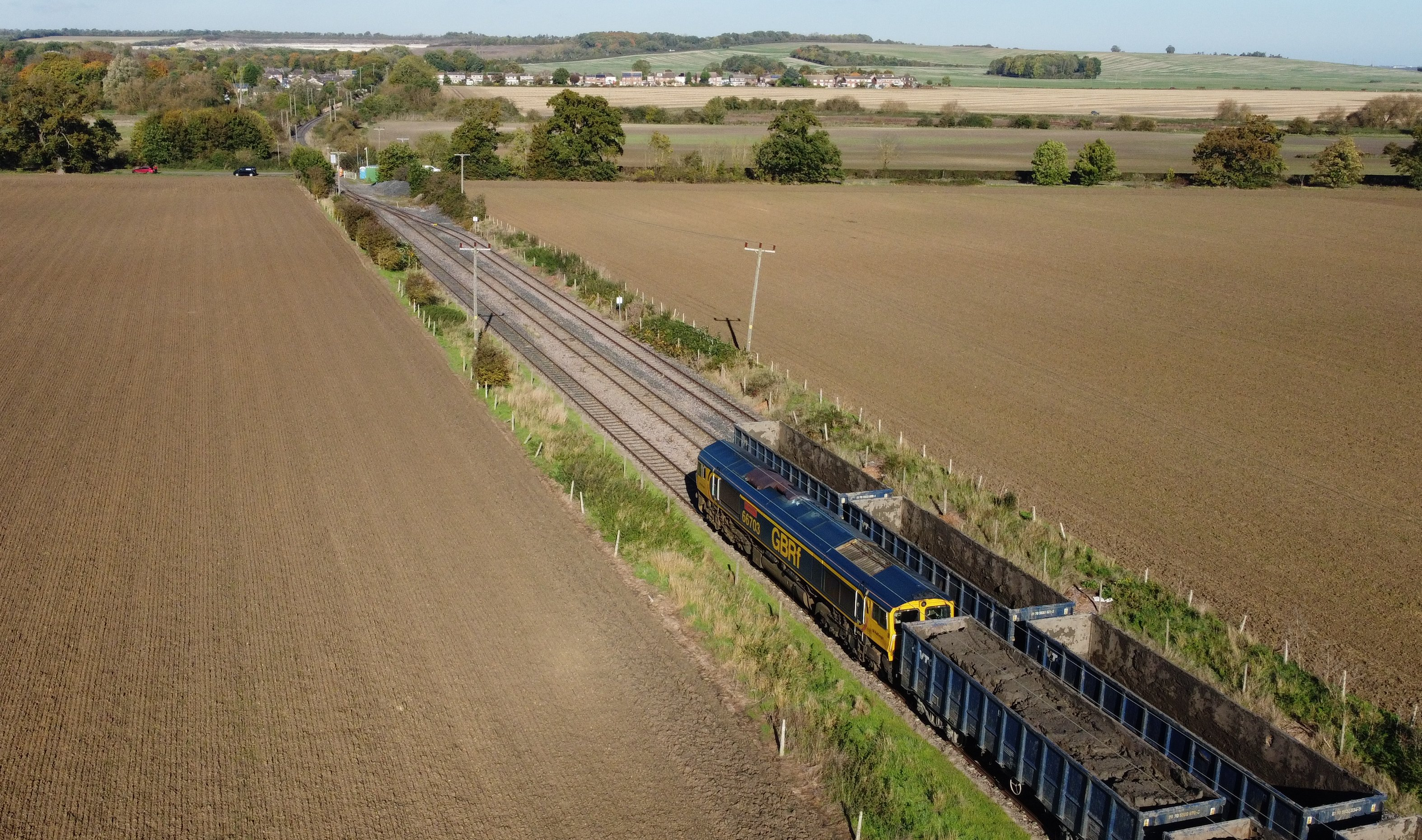
Two GBRf freight services on the Barrington branch in 2024.

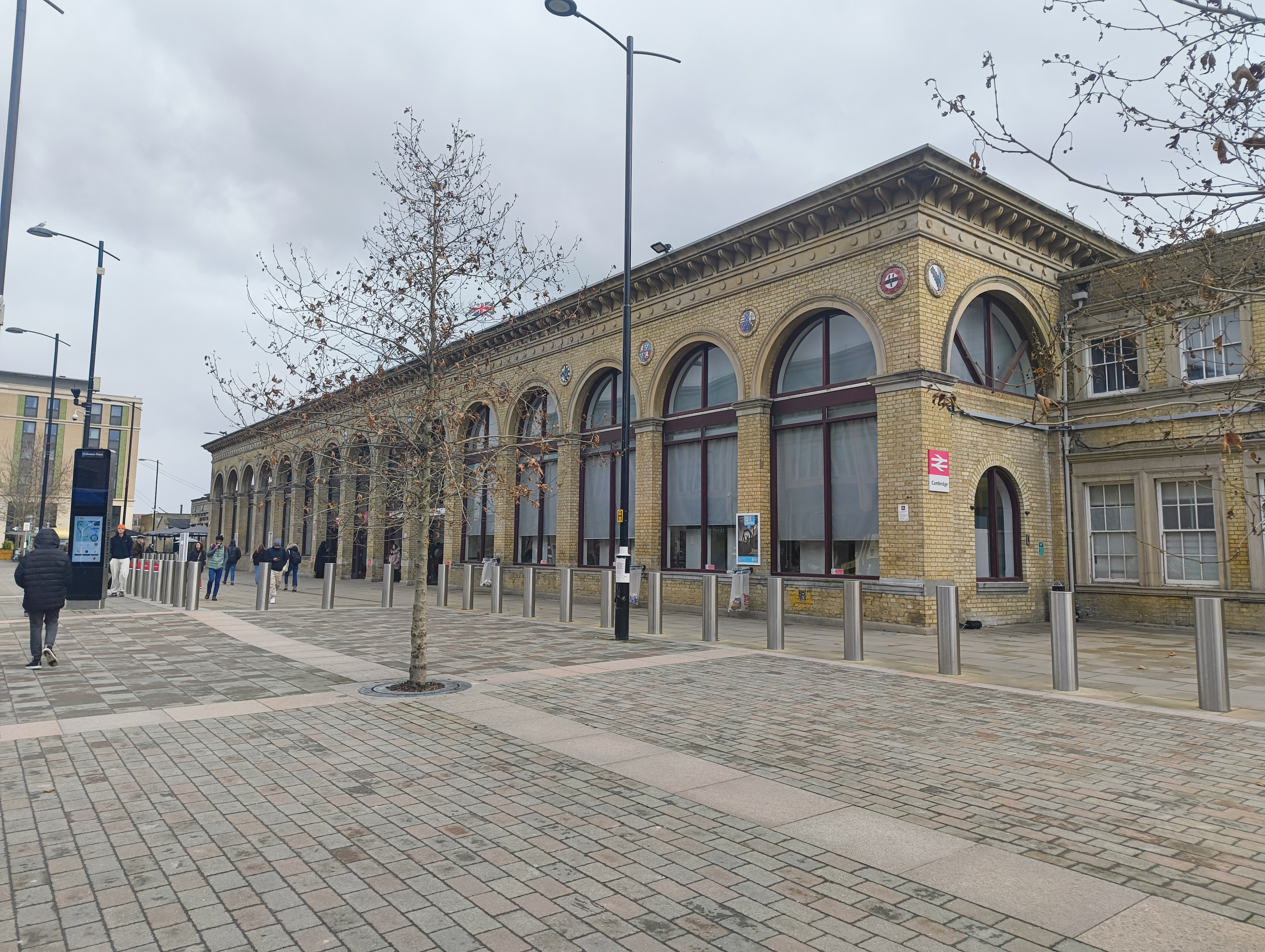
Cambridge railway station's façade in 2025.
