= Harston railway station =

Disused railway station in Cambridgeshire, England

Coordinates: 52.1338°N 0.0857°E

Harston

General information
- Location: Harston, South Cambridgeshire; England
- Grid reference: TL429504
- Platforms: 2

Other information
- Status: Disused

History
- Original company: Eastern Counties Railway
- Pre-grouping: Great Eastern Railway
- Post-grouping: London and North Eastern Railway

Key dates
- 1 April 1852: Station opened
- 17 June 1963: Station closed
Location

Harston was a railway station on the Cambridge Line, which served the village of Harston in Cambridgeshire. The station opened on 1 April 1852, and closed on 17 June 1963. A small part of the former southbound platform remains in situ but otherwise all remains of the station have gone. However, the Cambridge Line, which formerly served the station, remains an increasingly busy commuter line connecting the East Coast Main Line to the West Anglia Main Line.

== Routes ==
Preceding station	Disused railways	Following station
Foxton	British Railways; Cambridge Line	Cambridge
