= Meldreth railway station =

Railway station in Cambridgeshire, England

Meldreth
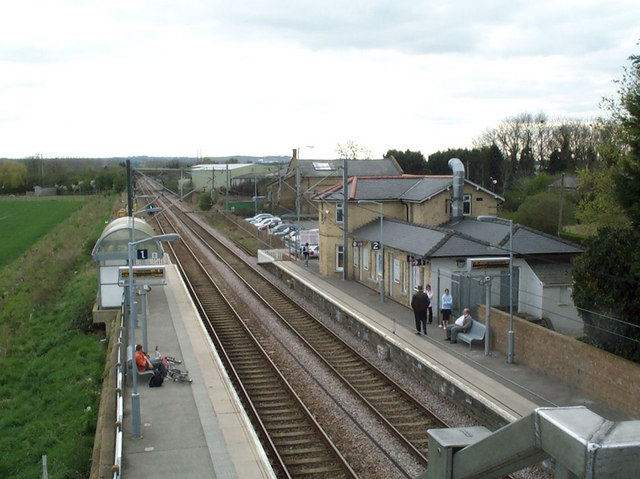

General information
- Location: Meldreth, South Cambridgeshire; England
- Coordinates: 52.0907°N 0.0089°E
- Grid reference: TL377455
- Manager: Great Northern
- Platforms: 2

Other information
- Station code: MEL
- Classification: DfT category E

History
- Opened: 1 August 1851

Passengers
- 2021–22: ▲0.181 million
- 2022–23: ▲0.217 million
- 2023–24: ▲0.230 million
- 2024–25: ▲0.246 million
- 2025–26: ▲0.266 million
Location
Notes
- Passenger statistics from the Office of Rail and Road

Meldreth railway station serves the villages of Meldreth and Melbourn in Cambridgeshire, England. It is 47 miles 75 chains (47.94 miles, 77.15 km) from London King's Cross on the Cambridge Line.

== Services ==
All services at Meldreth are operated by Great Northern using Class 387 EMUs.

The typical off-peak service is one train per hour in each direction between Cambridge and London King's Cross. Additional services call at the station during the peak hours.

Preceding station	National Rail	Following station
Royston	Great Northern Cambridge Line	Shepreth

== History ==
On 1 August 2001 local celebrations marked the 150th anniversary of the station's opening in 1851.
