= Eastern Region of British Railways =

Former British railways operating region

- Region Logo from 1965 to 1992
- Franchise: Not subject to franchising (1 January 1948 – 31 December 1992)
- Main Regions: London, East of England, East Midlands
- Parent company: British Railways

Technical
- Track gauge: 4 ft 8 1/2 in (1,435 mm) standard gauge

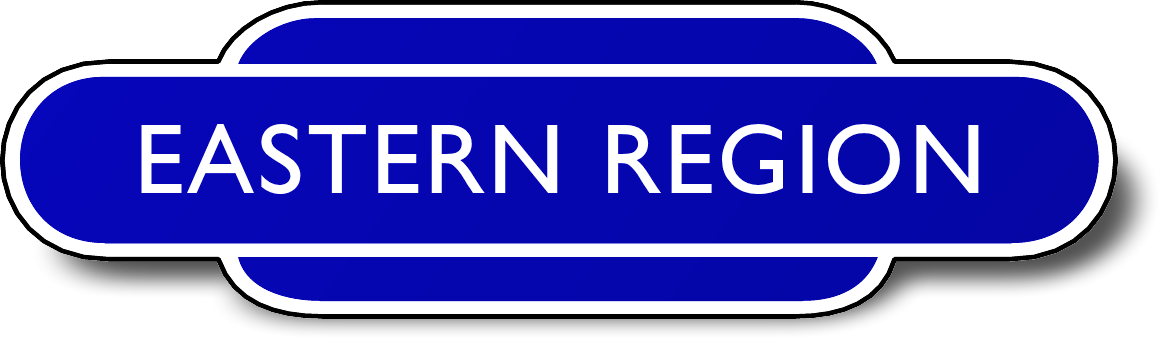
Station totem design prior to 1965

The Eastern Region was a region of British Railways from 1948, whose operating area could be identified from the dark blue signs and colour schemes that adorned its station and other railway buildings. Together with the North Eastern Region (with which it amalgamated in 1967), it covered most lines of the former London and North Eastern Railway, except in Scotland. By 1988 the Eastern Region had been divided again into the Eastern Region and the new Anglia Region, with the boundary points being between Peterborough and Whittlesea, and between Royston and Meldreth. The region ceased to be an operating unit in its own right in the 1980s and was wound up at the end of 1992.

== History ==
The region was formed in at nationalisation in 1948, mostly out of the former Great Northern, Great Eastern and Great Central lines that were merged into the LNER in 1923. Of all the "Big Four" pre-nationalisation railway companies, the LNER was most in need of significant investment. In the immediate post-war period there was a need to rebuild the destroyed stations in London and along the busy East Coast Main Line and former Great Central Railway. Additionally, the LNER had begun a suburban electrification programme which the British Transport Commission was pledged to continue. It was partially for this reason that the former LNER in England was divided into Eastern and North Eastern regions to focus investment, unlike the other English and Welsh regions that wholly took over their respective former companies' lines. In 1967 this policy was reversed and North Eastern was merged with the Eastern region.

Over the years the region was recast to be geographical rather than being based upon pre-nationalisation ownership. In 1949 the Eastern Region gained the London, Tilbury and Southend lines from the London Midland Region. In a major national boundary change in 1958 the former Great Central network except those lines in Yorkshire and Lincolnshire transferred to the London Midland Region; in return the Eastern gained the former LMS lines in Lincolnshire and the present-day South Yorkshire. In the 1960s the Eastern became one of the regions most affected by the Beeching Axe, losing route miles in every county served and seeing the closure of previously important (but "duplicate") lines such as Harrogate to Northallerton via Ripon.

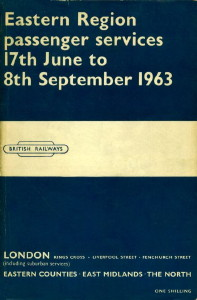
British Railways Eastern Region timetable for Summer 1963.

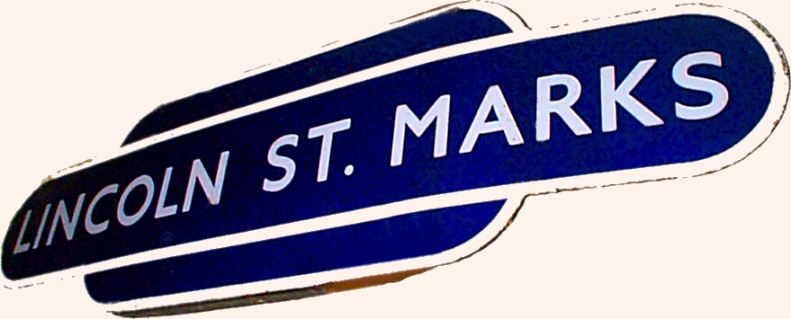
British Railways Eastern Region "totem" station sign for Lincoln St Marks

== Network ==
The main routes were:

- Liverpool Street station and the former GER eastern main line to Shenfield, Colchester and Harwich in Essex, Norwich in Norfolk and Ipswich and Felixstowe in Suffolk
- Liverpool Street station and the former GER western main line to Cambridge and King's Lynn (Norfolk)
- London King's Cross railway station to Stevenage in Hertfordshire and Peterborough in Cambridgeshire
- Fenchurch Street railway station to Basildon (from 1974), Southend and Shoeburyness.
- London Marylebone to Leicester, Nottingham and Sheffield on the Great Central Main Line (transferred to the London Midland Region in 1950)

The lines were managed as the Great Northern (Kings Cross services) and the Great Eastern (Liverpool Street and Fenchurch Street services), with the regional headquarters at 55 Liverpool Street. After the merger with the North Eastern Region, that region's headquarters in York became the headquarters of the new Eastern Region.

Commuter services via the North London line were also run into Broad Street station, but these were slowly run down and diverted to other destinations, with the station eventually being closed in 1986.

== Ferries ==
- Gravesend–Tilbury Ferry

== Electrification ==
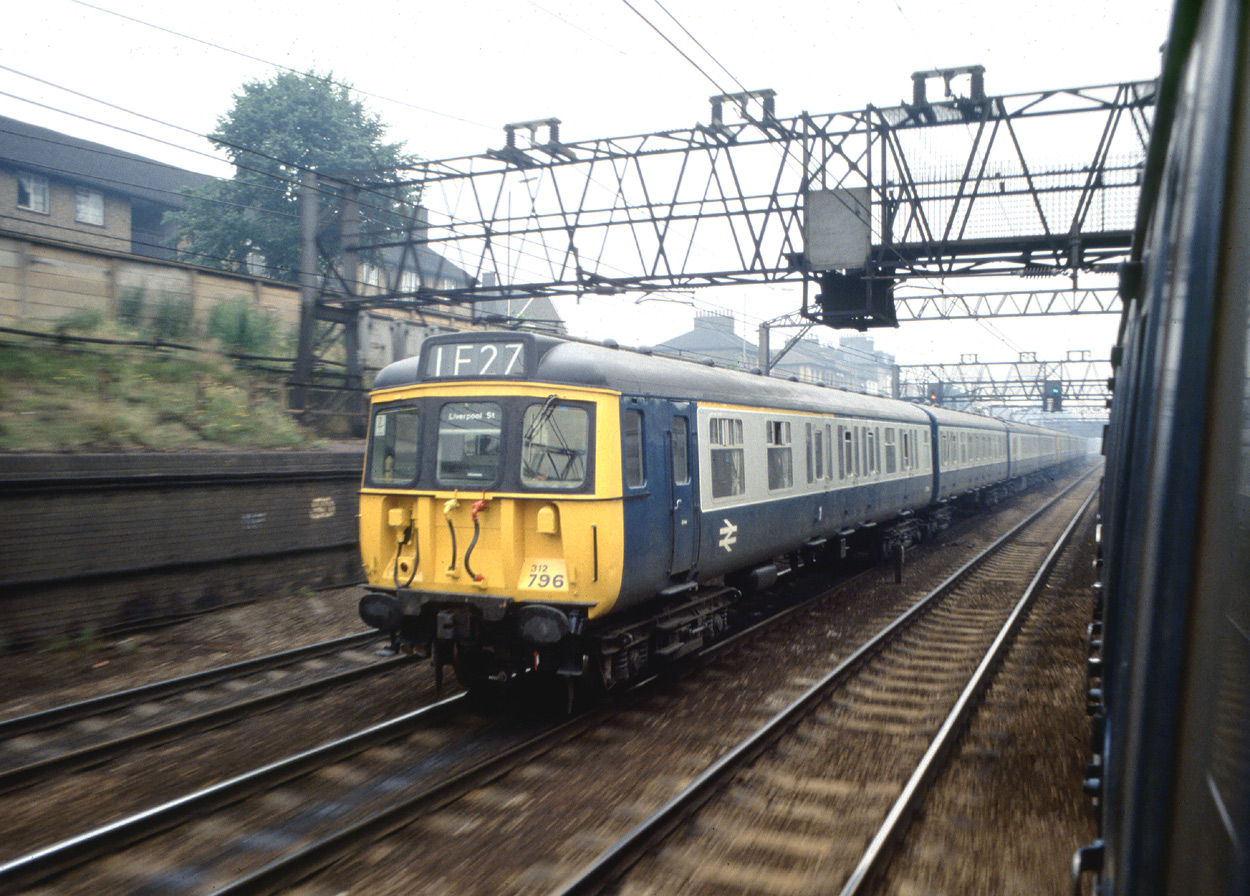
The front of a British Railways Class 312 stock train in British Rail corporate 1970s Blue/Grey livery passes through East London on a working to London's Liverpool Street station, as seen from the open window of another train

The Region continued the LNER's programme of electrification, using the then-standard 1500 V overhead DC system, in the London suburbs, allowing for the removal of steam services from Essex by the mid-1950s, and on the busy Woodhead route between Manchester and Sheffield. The original plan had called for the eventual electrification of most of the LNER, and the Eastern Region sought to continue this policy as part of the 1955 Modernisation Plan. However, the British Transport Commission felt that many Eastern Region routes would not benefit from this; indeed, many of the rural lines proposed for electrification were in fact closed entirely by Dr Beeching. Instead, the Eastern Region had to content itself with being an early adopter of diesel-electric power, replacing steam at the earliest opportunity.

The premier East Coast Main Line was not electrified throughout until the late 1980s, by which time the Eastern Region had been abolished with the coming of sectorisation.
