= Royston railway station =

Railway station in Hertfordshire, England

Coordinates: 52.053°N 0.027°W

Royston
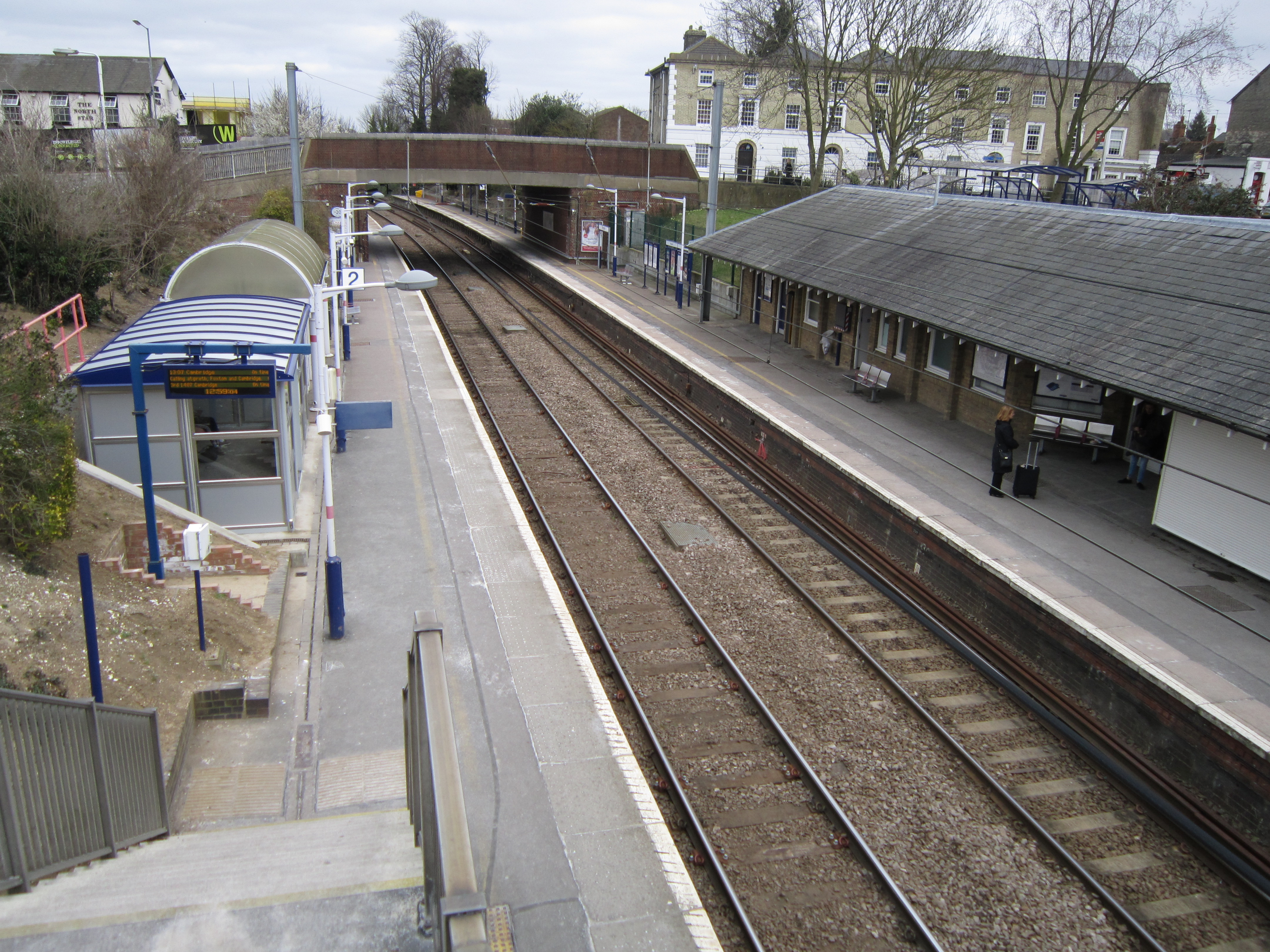
- A view of both platforms

General information
- Location: Royston, District of North Hertfordshire; England
- Grid reference: TL353412
- Managed by: Great Northern
- Platforms: 2

Other information
- Station code: RYS
- Classification: DfT category D

History
- Opened: 1850

Passengers
- 2020–21: ▼0.290 million
- Interchange: ▼2,650
- 2021–22: ▲0.835 million
- Interchange: ▲9,630
- 2022–23: ▲1.081 million
- Interchange: ▲14,420
- 2023–24: ▲1.272 million
- Interchange: ▲42,985
- 2024–25: ▲1.416 million
- Interchange: ▼18,806
Location
Notes
- Passenger statistics from the Office of Rail and Road

Royston railway station serves the town of Royston, in Hertfordshire, England. The station is 44 miles 72 chains (72.3 km) from London Kings Cross on the Cambridge Line. Trains serving the station are operated by Thameslink and Great Northern.

The station is an important stop on the commuter line between King's Cross and Cambridge as the majority of semi-fast services between London and Cambridge stop at Royston; one exception is the Cambridge Cruiser fast services from London. It is also the last station before Cambridge with platforms capable of handling 12-car trains. Therefore, it is used by many commuters, not only from Royston but also from smaller stations north of Royston, who transfer from stopping services to faster trains at the station.

Royston station is still labelled as Royston (Herts) on tickets and information displays, even though the station with the same name in South Yorkshire closed in 1968.

== History ==
The station was opened by the Royston and Hitchin Railway in October 1850 as its initial eastern terminus. The line was subsequently extended as far as Shepreth the following year and through to Cambridge by the Eastern Counties Railway in 1852. The latter company took out a lease on the Royston company from then until 1866 and ran trains between Cambridge and the Great Northern Railway's main line junction at Hitchin until its lease expired. Thereafter, the GNR took over and began running through trains from Cambridge to Kings Cross from 1 April 1866.

=== Electrification ===
The railway from London King's Cross to Royston was electrified in 1978. Class 312 electric multiple units from King's Cross terminated at Royston; passengers wishing to travel to Cambridge had to change to a connecting diesel multiple unit. From 1988 the whole line from London to Cambridge was electrified, ending the need to change trains at Royston. Full services commenced on 2 May 1988. Network SouthEast commissioned the electrification from Royston to Cambridge as a fill-in scheme to link the wired routes either side; the ex-ECR main line electrification north of Bishops Stortford had been inaugurated the previous year.

== Infrastructure ==
Both up and down lines through Royston station are signalled bi-directionally, meaning that Royston is the only place on the Cambridge Line where a train can overtake one ahead of it. The signalling is controlled by Kings Cross power signal box.

The station is located on a long sweeping curve, reducing the line speed in the up direction to 50 mph, and a differential speed of 50/65 mph in the down direction.

== Services ==
Services at Royston are operated by Thameslink and Great Northern using Class 387 and Class 700 electric multiple units.

The typical off-peak service in trains per hour is:

- 1 tph to London King's Cross (stopping)
- 2 tph to Brighton via London Bridge and Gatwick Airport (semi-fast)
- 3 tph to Cambridge (two of these run non-stop and one calls at all stations)

During peak hours, the service to London King's Cross and the all stations service to Cambridge are increased to 2 tph; the station is served by an additional half-hourly service between London King's Cross and King's Lynn, via Ely, which runs non-stop between London King's Cross and Letchworth Garden City.

On Sundays, the service between Brighton and Cambridge is reduced to hourly.

Preceding station	National Rail	Following station
Ashwell & Morden	Thameslink Cambridge Line	Cambridge South
Ashwell & Morden	Great Northern Cambridge Line	Meldreth
