= Shepreth railway station =

Railway station in Cambridgeshire, England

Coordinates: 52.114°N 0.031°E

Shepreth
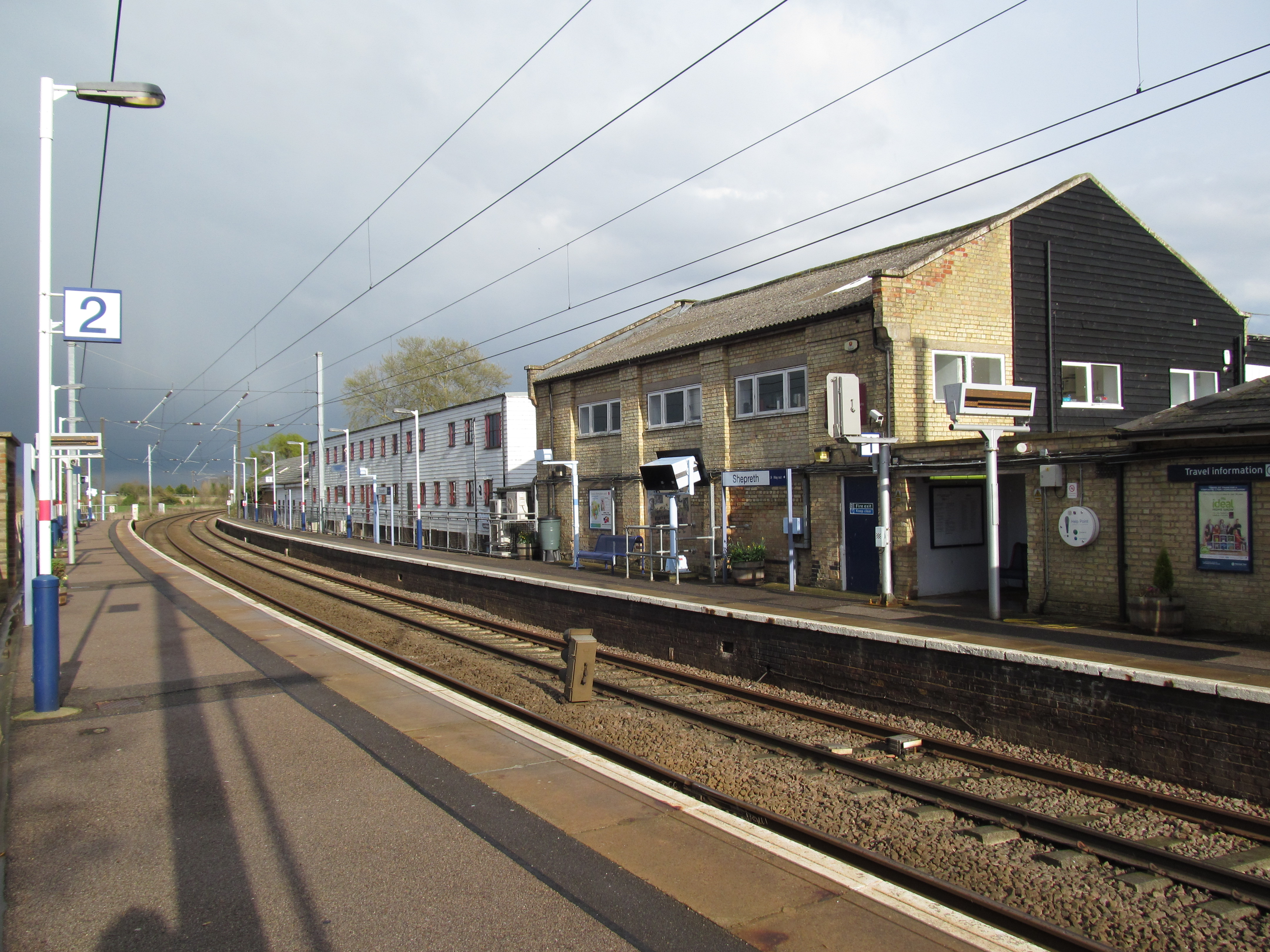

General information
- Location: Shepreth, South Cambridgeshire; England
- Grid reference: TL392481
- Managed by: Great Northern
- Platforms: 2

Other information
- Station code: STH
- Classification: DfT category F2

History
- Opened: 1851

Passengers
- 2020–21: ▼23,676
- 2021–22: ▲68,718
- 2022–23: ▲91,082
- 2023–24: ▲98,754
- 2024–25: ▲0.110 million
Location
Notes
- Passenger statistics from the Office of Rail and Road

Shepreth railway station serves the village of Shepreth in Cambridgeshire, England. The station is on the Cambridge Line, 49 miles 67 chains (49.84 miles, 80.21 km) from London King's Cross.

== History ==
It was opened in 1851 by the Royston and Hitchin Railway as the northern terminus of an extension of the original route from Royston, after earlier plans by the Eastern Counties Railway to build a Cambridge to Bedford line through the village fell through due to lack of finance. The ECR did complete the line north through to a junction with its main line from London to Cambridge in 1852 and initially ran services on the R&HR, but they later gave way to the Great Northern Railway when its lease of the Royston company expired in 1866. The GNR then began running through trains between Kings Cross & Cambridge over the line from 1 April that year, having gained full running powers over ECR metals and access to Cambridge station as part of an agreement ratified by parliament two years previously.

Goods traffic was handled at the station until 1965. From 1978, through trains to the capital temporarily ceased when electric operation was inaugurated to Royston as part of the Kings Cross Outer Suburban electrification scheme. Passengers then had to use a Cambridge to Royston DMU shuttle and change at the latter station for London. Government approval for extending the wires through to Cambridge was eventually granted in 1987 (as a 'fill-in' scheme to link wired routes either side) and the work was completed 12 months later, allowing through running to Kings Cross to resume.

Platform 2 (for trains to Cambridge) was extended to 171m in Summer 2017 to be able to accommodate 8-car trains (including Class 700 units), without straddling the level crossing. Although platform 1 was not lengthened, and remains 97m, 8-car trains now call there using Selective door operation which opens the doors on the front four carriages only.

== Services ==
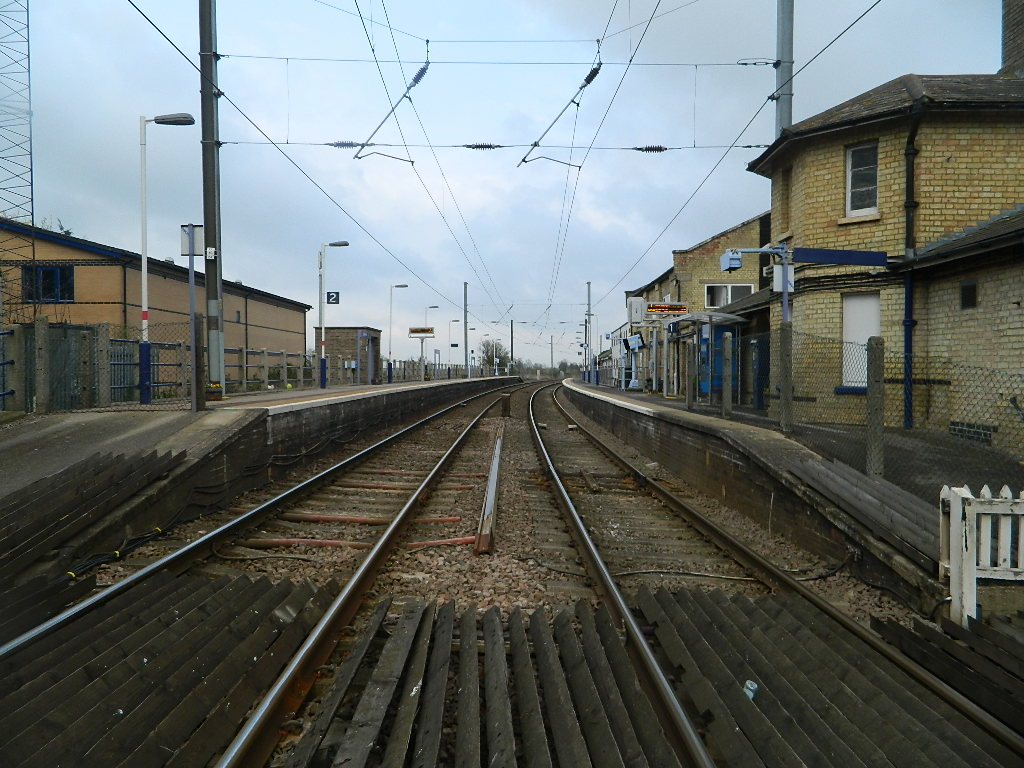
Shepreth Rail Station from the level crossing

All services at Shepreth are operated by Great Northern using Class 387 EMUs.

The typical off-peak service is one train per hour in each direction between Cambridge and London King's Cross. Additional services call at the station during the peak hours.

Preceding station	National Rail	Following station
Meldreth	Great Northern Cambridge Line	Foxton
