= Infrastructure of the East Coast Main Line =

The infrastructure of the East Coast Main Line comprises the tunnels, viaducts and bridges on the East Coast Main Line as well as the lineside monitoring equipment. The line is mainly quadruple track from London to Stoke Tunnel, south of Grantham, with two double track sections: one between Digswell Jn & Woolmer Green Jn, where the line passes over the Digswell Viaduct, Welwyn North station and the two Welwyn tunnels; and one between Fletton Junction (south of Peterborough) and Holme Junction, south of Holme Fen. The route between Holme Junction and Huntingdon is mostly triple track, with the exception of a southbound loop between Conington and Woodwalton. North of Grantham the line is double track except for quadruple-track sections at Retford, around Doncaster, between Colton Junction (south of York), Thirsk and Northallerton, and Newcastle.

With most of the line rated for 125 mph (200 km/h) operation, the ECML was the fastest main line in the UK until the opening of High Speed 1. The high speeds are possible because much of the line is on fairly straight track on the flatter, eastern side of England, through Lincolnshire and Cambridgeshire, though there are significant speed restrictions because of the line's curvature particularly north of Darlington and between Doncaster and Leeds. By contrast, the West Coast Main Line crosses the Trent Valley and the mountains of Cumbria, with more curvature and a lower speed limit of 110 mph (180 km/h). Speeds on the West Coast Main Line (WCML) were increased with the introduction of tilting Pendolino trains and now match the 125 mph speeds on the ECML.

== Tunnels, viaducts and bridges ==
Major civil engineering structures on the East Coast Main Line include: (Note: Structures considered major are either those shown in the Sectional Appendix or that are of listed status.)

Tunnels, viaducts and major bridges on the East Coast Main Line
Photo	Railway structure	Listed status (Note: In England, listed buildings are either Grade I, II*, or II, and are the responsibility of Historic England. In Scotland, listed buildings are either Category A, B, or C, and are the responsibility of Historic Environment Scotland.)	Length in chains (Note: 1 chain is 1/80 of a mile, which is 0.0125 miles or approximately 0.0201 kilometres.) (Note: Calculated as (end mileage – start mileage) unless otherwise cited)	End mileage (Note: Mileage data is either taken directly from the National Electronic Sectional Appendix, or from a measured distance on Google Maps from another point whose mileage is in the National Electronic Sectional Appendix.) Start mileage	ELR	Next station Previous station	Ref.
Distance from Edinburgh Waverley
	Calton North Tunnel		23	0 miles 27 chains 0 miles 50 chains	ECM8	Edinburgh Waverley Musselburgh	
	Calton South Tunnel		18	0 miles 29 chains 0 miles 47 chains	ECM8	Edinburgh Waverley Musselburgh	
	Dunglass Viaduct	A (Note: There were formerly two entries for the viaduct because it spans two local authorities, one at category A and one at category B. On 1 February 2019, the category B listing was removed for clarity.)	6	36 miles 02 chains 36 miles 08 chains	ECM8	Dunbar Berwick-upon-Tweed	
	Peelwalls Bridges	C	1	49 miles 48 chains 49 miles 49 chains	ECM8	Dunbar Berwick-upon-Tweed	
	Peelwalls Bridges	C	1	50 miles 08 chains 50 miles 09 chains	ECM8	Dunbar Berwick-upon-Tweed	
Distance from Newcastle
	Royal Border Bridge (River Tweed)	I	33	66 miles 74 chains 66 miles 41 chains	ECM7	Berwick-upon-Tweed Chathill	
	River Aln Viaduct	II	10	35 miles 50 chains 35 miles 40 chains	ECM7	Chathill Alnmouth	
	River Coquet Viaduct	II	9	30 miles 01 chains 29 miles 72 chains	ECM7	Chathill Alnmouth	
	Pegswood Viaduct (River Wansbeck)	II	9	17 miles 57 chains 17 mile 48 chains	ECM7	Pegswood Morpeth	
	River Blyth Viaduct	II	6	12 miles 23 chains 12 miles 17 chains	ECM7	Morpeth Cramlington	
	Ouseburn Viaduct (Ouseburn Valley)	II*	14	1 miles 18 chains 1 mile 04 chains	ECM7	Cramlington Manors	
	Newcastle railway station to Pilgrim Street (Note: The entire railway viaduct starting at Newcastle railway station and going east to Pilgrim Street comprises five contiguous Grade II listed structures: Railway Viaduct Between Dean Street and Pilgrim Street; Railway Arch, Dean Street; Railway Viaduct Between St Nicholas Street and the Side; Railway Arch South West of Black Gate; Accommodation Arch and Railway Viaduct Between High Level Bridge, Castle Garth and Central Station.)(Newcastle city centre)	II	29	0 miles 36 chains 0 miles 00 chains	ECM7	Manors Newcastle	
Distance from York
	King Edward VII Bridge (River Tyne)	II	13	79 miles 66 chains 79 miles 53 chains	ECM5	Newcastle Chester-le-Street	
	Askew Road Tunnel		3	79 miles 29 chains 79 miles 26 chains	ECM5	Newcastle Chester-le-Street	
	Chester Burn Viaduct	II	11	72 miles 19 chains 72 miles 08 chains	ECM5	Newcastle Chester-le-Street	
	Chester Dene Viaduct	II	10	71 miles 07 chains 70 miles 77 chains	ECM5	Chester-le-Street Durham	
	Durham Viaduct (Durham city centre)	II*	12	66 miles 06 chains 65 miles 74 chains	ECM5	Durham Darlington	
	Relly Mill Viaduct		6	65 miles 23 chains 65 miles 17 chains	ECM5	Durham Darlington	
	Langley Moor Viaduct (River Deerness)		6	64 miles 39 chains 64 miles 33 chains	ECM5	Durham Darlington	
	Croxdale Viaduct (River Wear)		9	62 miles 18 chains 62 miles 09 chains	ECM5	Durham Darlington	
	Ricknall Lane overbridge	II		50 miles 37 chains	ECM5	Durham Darlington	
	Croft Viaduct (River Tees)	II	6	41 miles 11 chains 41 miles 05 chains	ECM5	Darlington Northallerton	
Distance from King's Cross							
	Balby Bridge Tunnel		4	155 miles 38 chains 155 miles 34 chains	ECM1	Doncaster Retford	
	Askham Tunnel		3	134 miles 40 chains 134 miles 37 chains	ECM1	Retford Newark Northgate	
	Peascliffe Tunnel		44	108 miles 29 chains 107 miles 65 chains	ECM1	Newark Northgate Grantham	
	Stoke Tunnel		40	100 miles 79 chains 100 miles 39 chains	ECM1	Grantham Peterborough	
	Bytham Viaduct		40	92 miles 63 chains 92 miles 59 chains	ECM1	Grantham Peterborough	
	Nene Viaduct (River Nene)	II	3	75 miles 68 chains 75 miles 65 chains	ECM1	Peterborough Huntingdon	
	Deard's End Lane Bridge	II		25 miles 30 chains	ECM1	Stevenage Knebworth	
	Welwyn North Tunnel		48	23 miles 12 chains 22 miles 44 chains	ECM1	Knebworth Welwyn North	
	Welwyn South Tunnel	II (Note: Only the southern portal of the tunnel is listed.)	20	22 miles 31 chains 22 miles 11 chains	ECM1	Knebworth Welwyn North	
	Digswell Viaduct (Mimram Valley)	II*	23	21 miles 60 chains 21 miles 37 chains	ECM1	Welwyn North Welwyn Garden City	
	Potters Bar Tunnel		65	12 miles 00 chains 11 miles 25 chains	ECM1	Potters Bar Hadley Wood	
	Hadley Wood North Tunnel		10	10 miles 70 chains 10 miles 60 chains	ECM1	Potters Bar Hadley Wood	
	Hadley Wood South Tunnel		18	10 miles 39 chains 10 miles 21 chains	ECM1	Hadley Wood New Barnet	
	Barnet Tunnel		28	7 miles 70 chains 7 miles 42 chains	ECM1	Oakleigh Park New Southgate	
	Wood Green Tunnel		32	5 miles 73 chains 5 miles 41 chains	ECM1	New Southgate Alexandra Palace	
	Copenhagen Tunnel		27	1 mile 12 chains 0 miles 65 chains	ECM1	Finsbury Park King's Cross	
	Gasworks Tunnel (Regent's Canal)		24	0 miles 46 chains 0 miles 22 chains		Finsbury Park King's Cross	

== Junctions ==
Major junctions on the East Coast Main Line include: (Note: Junctions considered major are those mentioned in the Sectional Appendix and those that connect the ECML to another heavy railway line, rather than merely between its tracks or with sidings.)

Photo	Junction	Mileage (Note: Mileage data is either taken directly from the National Electronic Sectional Appendix, or from a measured distance on Google Maps from another point whose mileage is in the National Electronic Sectional Appendix.)	ELR	Connects to	Next station Previous station	Ref.
	Portobello Junction	303 miles 1 chain 299 miles 76 chains	ECM8	Borders Railway	Edinburgh Musselburgh	
	Drem Junction	285 miles 9 chains	ECM8	North Berwick Branch	Drem East Linton	
	Morpeth North Junction	266 miles 6 chains	ECM7	Northumberland Line (Note: Morpeth Junction and Morpeth North Junction are freight-only.)	Pegswood Morpeth	
	Morpeth Junction	265 miles 42 chains	ECM7	Northumberland Line	Pegswood Morpeth	
	Benton North Junction	253 miles 0 chains	ECM7	Northumberland Line	Cramlington Manors	
	Newcastle East Junction	248 miles 70 chains	ECM7	Durham Coast Line	Manors Newcastle	
	King Edward Bridge South Junction	268 miles 02 chains	ECM5	Tyne Valley Line	Newcastle Chester-le-Street	
	Ferryhill South Junction	244 miles 57 chains	ECM5	Stillington Branch (freight only)	Durham Darlington	
	Darlington North Junction	232 miles 76 chains	ECM5	Tees Valley line	Durham Darlington	
	Darlington South Junction	223 miles 21 chains	ECM5	Tees Valley line	Darlington Northallerton	
	Northallerton High Junction	218 miles 49 chains	ECM5	Northallerton–Eaglescliffe line	Darlington Northallerton	
	Longlands Junction	217 miles 41 chains 217 miles 28 chains	ECM5	Northallerton–Eaglescliffe line	Darlington Northallerton	
	Skelton Junction	190 miles 10 chains	ECM5	Harrogate line	Thirsk York	
	York North Junction	188 miles 62 chains	ECM5	York–Scarborough line	Thirsk York	
	Colton Junction	182 miles 79 chains	ECM4	Dearne Valley line	York Doncaster	
	Hambleton Junction	174 miles 58 chains	ECM3	Selby Line	York Doncaster	
	Hambleton South Junction	174 miles 15 chains	ECM3	Selby Line	York Doncaster	
	Temple Hurst Junction	169 miles 16 chains	ECM2	Selby Line	York Doncaster	
	Shaftholme Junction	160 miles 16 chains	ECM1	North Doncaster Chord (links to Pontefract line, South Humberside Main Line, and Hull and Doncaster Branch)	York Doncaster	
	Marshgate Junction	156 miles 26 chains	ECM1	South Humberside Main Line Wakefield line	York Doncaster	
	South Yorkshire Junction	155 miles 59 chains 155 miles 56 chains	ECM1	Doncaster–Swinton line	Doncaster Retford	
	Decoy North Junction	154 miles 13 chains	ECM1	Doncaster–Lincoln line	Doncaster Retford	
	Black Carr Junction	153 miles 18 chains	ECM1	Doncaster–Lincoln line	Doncaster Retford	
	Retford West Junction	138 miles 56 chains	ECM1	Sheffield–Lincoln line	Doncaster Retford	
	Newark Crossing South Junction (includes Newark flat crossing)	120 miles 51 chains	ECM1	Grimsby–Lincoln–Newark line	Retford Newark Northgate	
	Grantham North Junction	106 miles 34 chains	ECM1	Nottingham–Grantham line	Retford Newark Northgate	
	Helpston Junction	81 miles 56 chains	ECM1	Birmingham–Peterborough line	Grantham Peterborough	
	Werrington Junction (includes Werrington dive-under)	79 miles 34 chains	ECM1	Peterborough–Lincoln line	Grantham Peterborough	
	Crescent Junction	76 miles 25 chains	ECM1	Hereward Line	Peterborough Huntingdon	
	Fletton Junction	74 miles 69 chains	ECM1	Nene Valley Railway	Peterborough Huntingdon	
	Hitchin North Junction (includes Hitchin Flyover)	32 miles 53 chains	ECM1	Cambridge line	Arlesey Hitchin	
	Cambridge Junction	31 miles 11 chains	ECM1	Cambridge line	Arlesey Hitchin	
	Langley Junction	26 miles 59 chains 26 miles 45 chains	ECM1	Hertford Loop line	Stevenage Knebworth	
	Wood Green North Junction	5 miles 7 chains	ECM1	Hertford Loop line	New Southgate Alexandra Palace	
	Harringay Junction	3 miles 29 chains	ECM1	Gospel Oak to Barking line	Harringay Finsbury Park	
	Finsbury Park Junction	2 miles 33 chains	ECM1	Northern City Line North London line (via freight-only Canonbury Curve)	Finsbury Park King's Cross	
	Copenhagen Junction	0 miles 64 chains	ECM1	High Speed 1 Midland Main Line	Finsbury Park King's Cross	
	Belle Isle Junction (includes Canal Tunnels)	0 miles 57 chains	ECM1	Thameslink Core	Finsbury Park King's Cross	

== See also ==
- Infrastructure of the Settle–Carlisle line
