= Welwyn Tunnels =

Railway tunnels in Hertfordshire

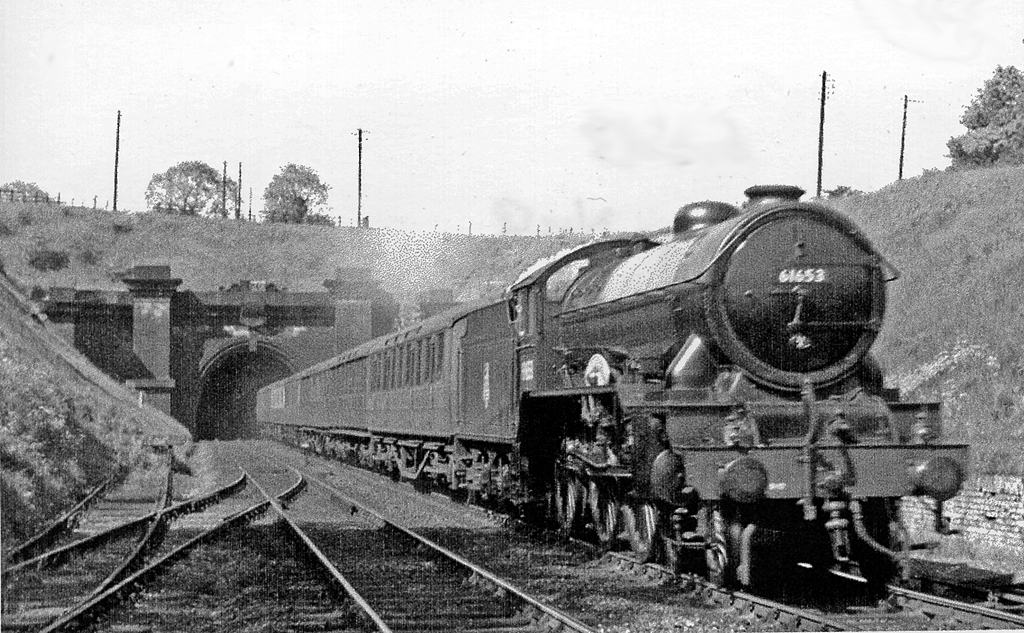
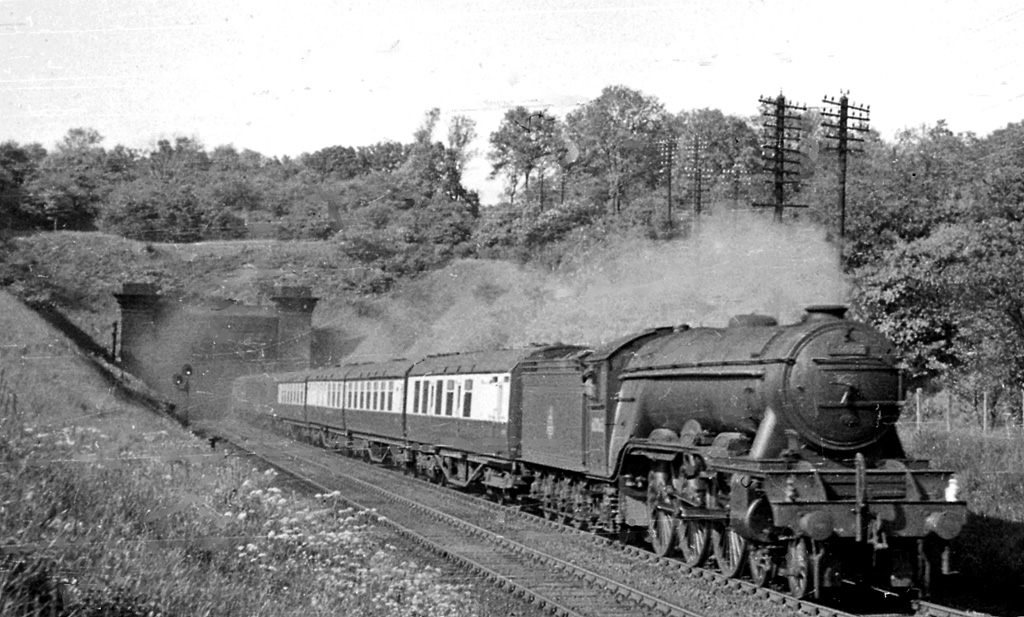
- The highly-decorated southern portal of Welwyn South Tunnel in 1951 The southern portal of Welwyn North Tunnel in 1951
- Interactive map of Welwyn Tunnels

Overview
- Line: East Coast Main Line
- Location: Digswell, Hertfordshire (Welwyn South Tunnel); Oaklands/Woolmer Green, Hertfordshire (Welwyn North Tunnel)
- Coordinates: 51.828°N 0.190°W
- Status: Operational
- System: National Rail

Operation
- Opened: 7 August 1850
- Owner: Network Rail
- Operator: See East Coast Main Line § Operators

Technical
- Design engineer: Thomas Brassey
- Length: North Tunnel: 1,046 yd (956 m); South Tunnel: 446 yd (408 m)
- No. of tracks: 2
- Track gauge: 4 ft 8 1/2 in (1,435 mm) standard gauge
- Electrified: 25 kV 50 Hz AC
- Operating speed: Down Main: 115 mph (185 km/h); Up Main: 105 mph (169 km/h) (South Tunnel); 125 mph (201 km/h) (North Tunnel)

The Welwyn North Tunnel and Welwyn South Tunnel are two railway tunnels on the East Coast Main Line between Welwyn North and Knebworth railway stations in Hertfordshire, England. They are 1,046 yards (956 m) and 446 yards (408 m) in length respectively, with an 11-chain (730 ft; 220 m) cutting between them. They each consist of a single bore, forming part of capacity problems on that section of the East Coast Main Line. They tolerate a speed of 115 miles per hour (185 km/h) on the Down Main track; the speed on the Up Main track is 125 miles per hour (201 km/h) in the North Tunnel and 105 miles per hour (169 km/h) in the South Tunnel.

The tunnels were built in 1849–50 as part of the Great Northern Railway between London and Peterborough. The southern portal of the South Tunnel is highly decorated and was given Grade II listed status in 2000 alongside the adjacent Welwyn North railway station. In 1886, there was a three-way crash in the North Tunnel caused by a broken-down train whose driver did not follow correct procedures; it would later be described as "one of the most destructive in railway history". In the modern day, the tunnels are frequently discussed as part of capacity issues on the East Coast Main Line which limit the trunk route to only 18 trains per hour.

== Design ==
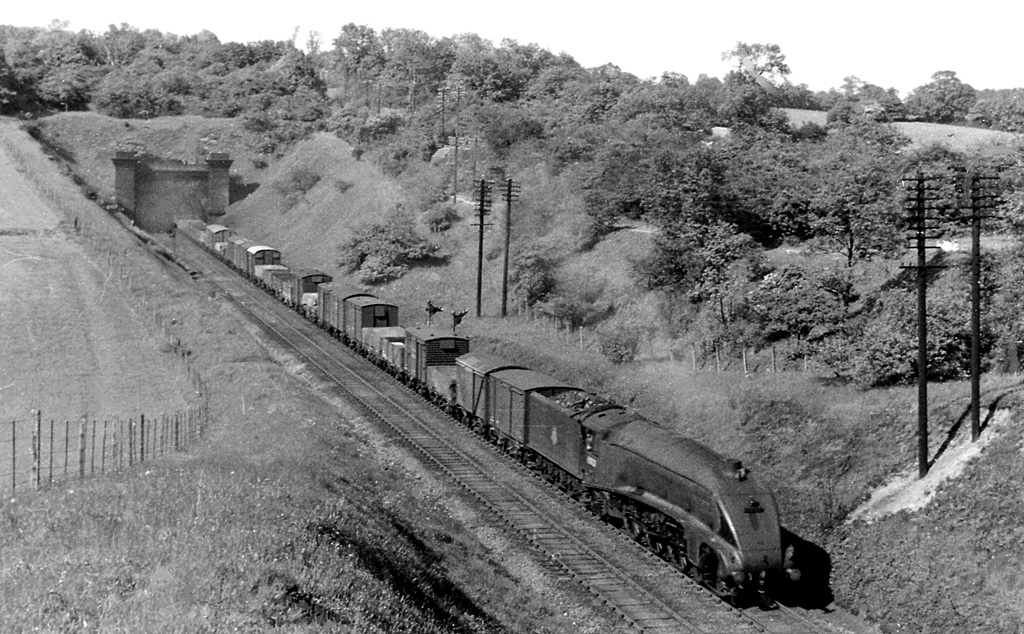
The cutting between the two tunnels; the train is heading southbound (Up) having just left the in-view Welwyn North Tunnel

Both tunnels consist of only a single bore, making them the closest tunnels to the terminus of the East Coast Main Line (ECML) at London King's Cross to do so. The nearest tunnels in either direction are the Potters Bar Tunnel, approximately 11 miles (18 km) to the south, and the Stoke Tunnel, approximately 73 miles (117 km) to the north. The South Tunnel is situated between 22 miles 11 chains (22.14 miles, 35.63 km) and 22 miles 31 chains (22.39 miles, 36.03 km) down the line from London King's Cross, from which distances on the ECML are measured, and the North Tunnel is situated between 22 miles 44 chains (22.55 miles, 36.29 km) and 23 miles 12 chains (23.15 miles, 37.26 km). The southern portal of the South Tunnel is situated around 300 metres (980 ft) from the end of the platforms at Welwyn North railway station.

The speed limit through both of the tunnels is 115 miles per hour (185 km/h) on the Down Main track; on the Up Main track, it is 125 miles per hour (201 km/h) in the North Tunnel and 105 miles per hour (169 km/h) in the South Tunnel. The speed limit on the Down Main track then increases to 125 miles per hour (201 km/h) immediately after the northern portal of the North Tunnel, marking the most southerly point on the line where the line reaches its maximum speed; this means that Knebworth railway station is the first through which trains may travel at this speed. The gradient of the tunnels and cutting between is 1 in 200 (5‰). The tunnels, along with the other seven between King's Cross and Peterborough, are perfectly straight, unlike most of the line. This is because curved tunnels were not possible with the technology of the time.

== History ==
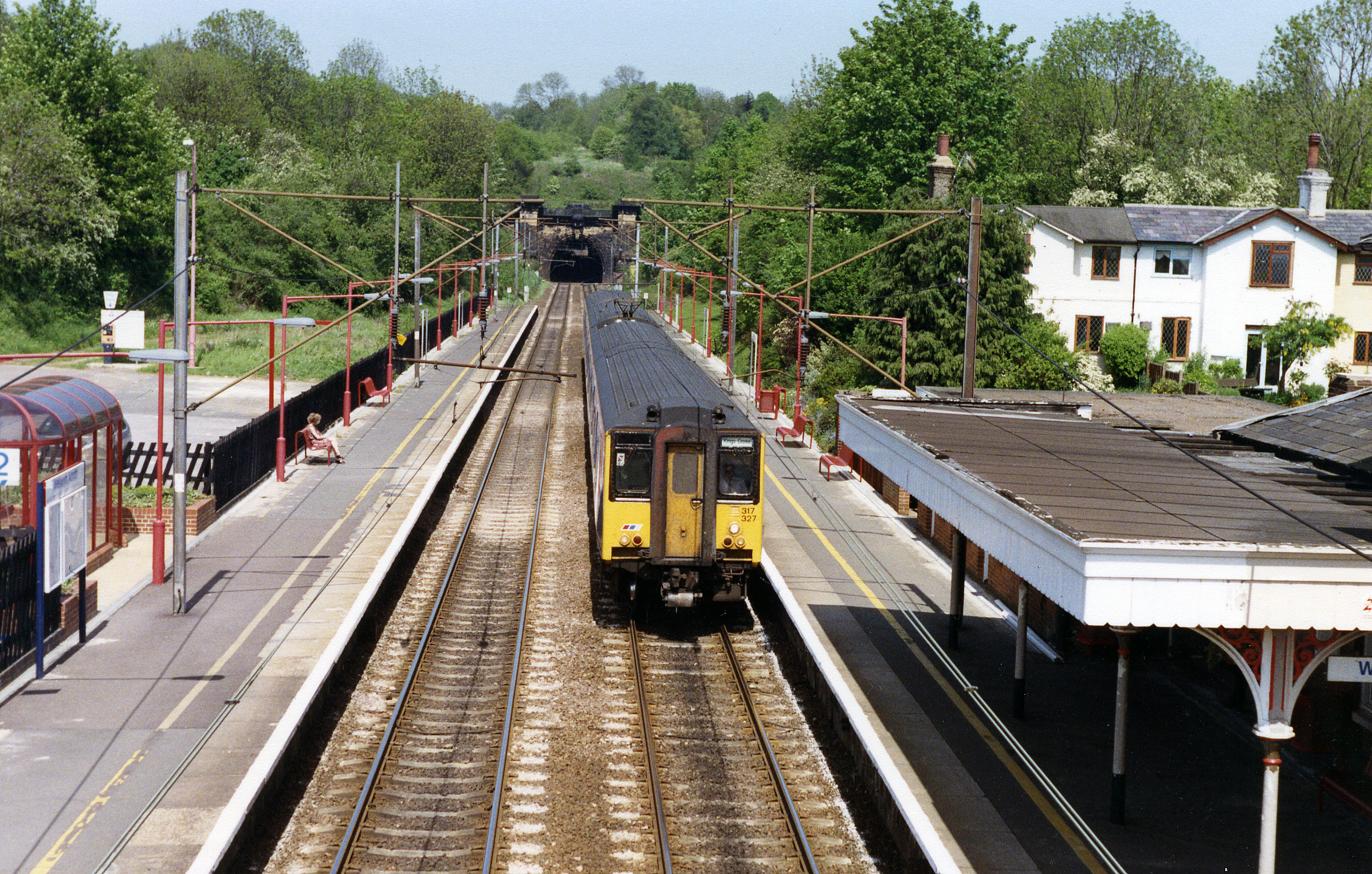
Welwyn North station and the southern portal of the South Tunnel, showing the bottleneck (1992)

The engineers who designed the layout of the Great Northern Railway (GNR) were William and Joseph Cubitt. The tunnels were built between 1849 and 1850, and were the responsibility of Thomas Brassey, who constructed the line between Hornsey and Peterborough. Services on the line began in 1850. The southern portal of the South tunnel, which is visible from Welwyn North railway station, was built from sandstone ashlar, as a semi-circular arch. The portal has towers on either side as well as a cornice and a parapet. The original name for the South Tunnel was either the Digswell Tunnel or the Locksley Hill Tunnel; the original name for the North Tunnel was the Harmer Green Tunnel.

On 9 June 1886, there was a major rail crash in the North Tunnel, which L. T. C. Rolt described as "one of the most destructive in railway history". Initially, a fault with an empty GNR goods train led to it becoming stationary on the Down (northbound) track in the Welwyn North Tunnel. The guard of the did not take adequate steps to protect it against a collision. The Welwyn signaller misunderstood the Knebworth signaller, and sent a second train following it into the tunnel, where they collided. A third train, an express GNR goods train travelling southbound, then hit the debris from the collision which had covered both tracks, and set alight. There were two injuries and two deaths.

Capacity issues surrounding the tunnels and nearby Digswell Viaduct have been raised since as early as the 1890s, when the Hertford Loop line was extended to Stevenage in order to prevent having to widen the viaduct from two tracks to four. The project was completed in 1898, and the Hertford Loop line is still used as a diversionary route for trains today when there is disruption on the East Coast Main Line. The Department for Transport's 2006 study on railway capacity raised the issue again.

In August 2013, BBC News listed the idea of widening the viaduct and the adjacent Welwyn Tunnels to four tracks as one of the top five infrastructure projects that could improve life for people in the United Kingdom. It estimated the cost of such a project at £440 million and considered its likelihood to be "probable, at some point". As of 2015 Network Rail set the maximum capacity of the bottleneck at 18 trains per hour (tph). The East Coast Main Line 2016 Capacity Review considered the quadrupling of the viaduct and Welwyn North railway station, concluding it "would not fully resolve the capacity constraints", only increasing capacity for intercity trains by 2–3tph.

The Welwyn North Tunnel is part of a Network Rail pilot program to investigate refurbishment of the deteriorating concentric brickwork of many Victorian era railway tunnels. Because the local geology renders it suitable for roadheaders and hydraulic picking as opposed to drilling and blasting, the ideal method is using a Tunnel Enlargement Machine; this reduces disruption by placing a shield inside the original lining and then excavating the original linings. On 4 October 2000, the southern portal of Welwyn South Tunnel was given Grade II listed status, which complements that of Welwyn North railway station's footbridge and station building, listed on the same date. As of March 2026, the operators passing through the Welwyn Tunnels include Grand Central, Great Northern and Thameslink, Hull Trains, London North Eastern Railway, and Lumo.

== See also ==
- Infrastructure of the East Coast Main Line
- Copenhagen Tunnel
- Gasworks Tunnel
- Potters Bar Tunnel
