= Screech =

A screech is a high-pitched scream from an animal.

Screech may also mean:

- Samuel "Screech" Powers, character played by Dustin Diamond in the NBC television sitcom Saved by the Bell
- A mascot for numerous sports teams, including:
  - Screech (mascot), the Major League Baseball Washington Nationals
  - the mascot of the Quebec Major Junior Hockey League Cape Breton Screaming Eagles
- Newfoundland Screech, a brand of rum from Newfoundland
- "Screech Squad," the trumpet section of the Marching Chiefs of Florida State University
- Screech (comics), an armored vigilante in Marvel comics
- Screech owl, a species of owl

== People with the surname ==
- Michael Andrew Screech (1926-2018), a cleric and a professor of French literature
- Roy Screech (born 1953), English bishop
- Timon Screech (born 1961), an academic of the University of London (School of Oriental and African Studies)
