= Hitchin Flyover =

Grade-separated railway viaduct in England

Coordinates: 51.96993°N 0.26355°W

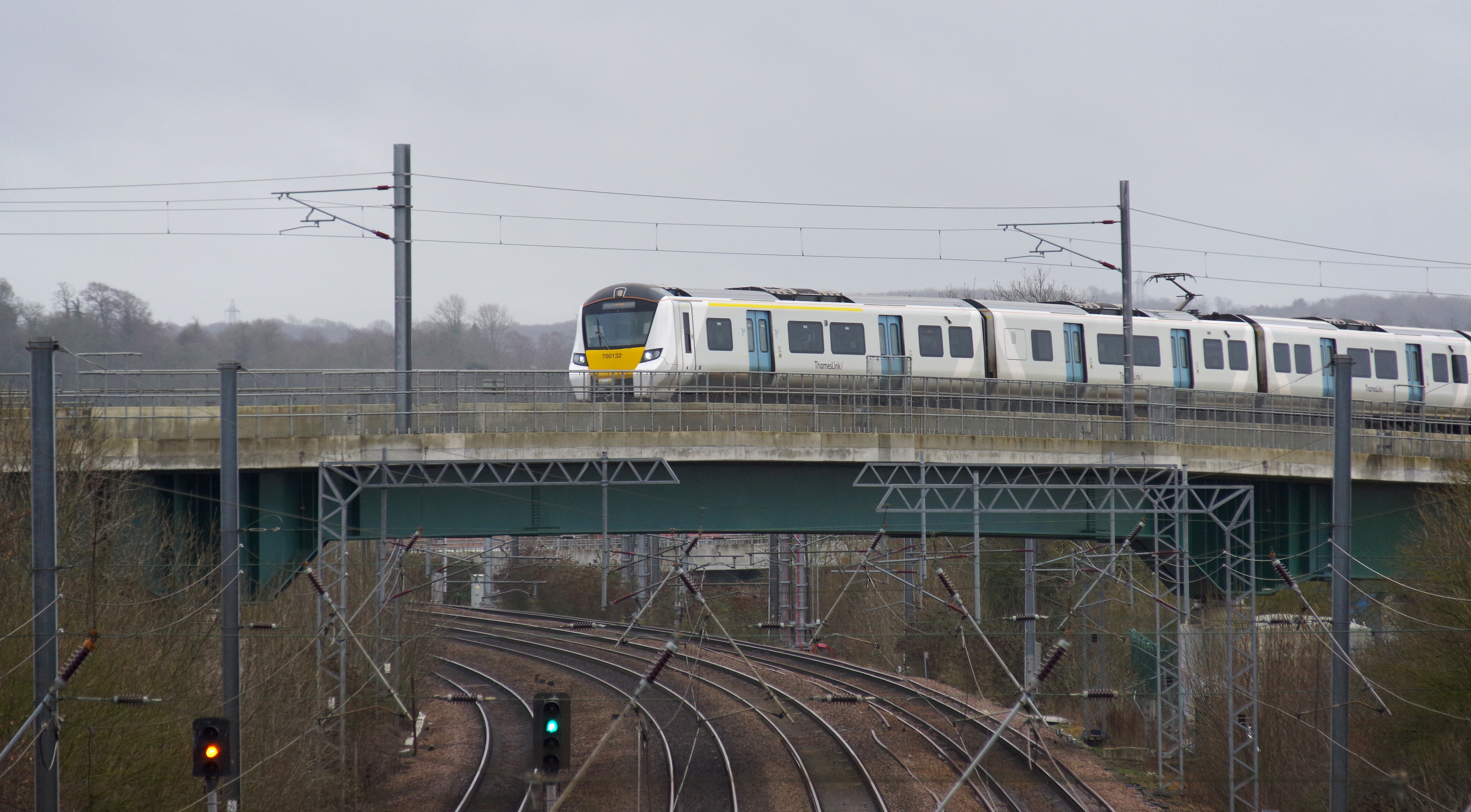
- A Thameslink Class 700 crossing the flyover
- Carries: Down Cambridge Flyover line
- Crosses: East Coast Main Line
- Named for: Hitchin

Rail characteristics
- No. of tracks: Single track

History
- Built: 2011–2013
- Opened: June 2013

Location
- Interactive map of Hitchin Flyover

The Hitchin Flyover is a railway flyover 0.7 miles (1.1 km) north of Hitchin railway station in Hitchin, Hertfordshire. The flyover allows the Down Cambridge Flyover line to cross over the four tracks of the congested East Coast Main Line to connect to the Cambridge line, as opposed to the former flat junction at the same location, which remains in situ nevertheless. The flyover carries a single track for 1.41 miles (2.27 km), eventually joining the Down Cambridge line from the flat junction.

Plans to make the junction grade-separated had arisen as early as the 1970s when British Rail were upgrading the Great Northern route, but the planned fly-under was never built. Combined with the bottleneck of the two-track section containing the Digswell Viaduct and Welwyn Tunnels, the need for northbound trains to cross three tracks was considered problematic enough that a flyover was feasible. The flyover was planned in 2011 and constructed between 2012 and 2013. Today it is used by Govia Thameslink Railway services under their Great Northern and Thameslink brands.

== Design ==
The flyover consists of a 1.41 miles (2.27 km) single-track electrified railway line, including both sections of embankment and a viaduct that carries the Down Cambridge Flyover line over the four tracks of the East Coast Main Line. The Down direction is away from London towards Peterborough or Cambridge; the Up direction is the opposite. The flyover line diverges from the East Coast Main Line at Cambridge Junction, which is 0.7 miles (1.1 km) north of Hitchin railway station and 160 yards (150 m) south of the bridge that carries the East Coast Main Line over the River Hiz. The flyover passes over the East Coast Main Line on a 22-span 870 yards (800 m) viaduct, before joining the Down Cambridge line towards Letchworth Garden City at Hitchin East Junction. The flat junction at the station remains in situ, which provides an alternative route for trains to access the Cambridge line from the Down Slow or Down Fast line.

== History ==
=== Background and proposals ===
The East Coast Main Line is a railway that runs between Kings Cross in London and Edinburgh Waverley stations, and it forms a vital part of the UK's railway network. The two most significant historical bottlenecks on the southern part of the route are the flat junction north of Hitchin, and ten miles to the south where the line's four tracks drop to two to cross the Digswell Viaduct. This is because northbound trains had to cross the three other tracks in order to diverge from the East Coast Main Line and access the Cambridge line at Cambridge Junction. The junction was described as one of the busiest in the UK by number of services in 2013.

In the 1970s, British Rail began modernising, rationalising, and electrifying the Great Northern route, which included alleviation of other bottlenecks on the route such as building a new flyover at Welwyn Garden City railway station. In the 1980s, the construction of a flyunder to allow trains to avoid the flat junction were put forward, and land was set aside in order to construct it. However, the project was not seen to be feasible and did not materialise. This was followed in 1998 for a feasibility study which included various plans for flyovers, but once again none were taken further.

In 2006, the Office of Rail and Road released a document entitled Issues in Defining and Measuring Railway Capacity, in which they discussed various capacity issues on the East Coast Main Line and projects aiming to mitigate them. Commenting on the idea of a flyover at Hitchin, they argued such a project "would undoubtedly make pathing more flexible and operations more robust"; however, they also said that it would not increase capacity as it was Digswell Viaduct that was the limiting factor on the number of services ran.

Network Rail (Hitchin (Cambridge Junction)) Order 2011
- Statutory Instrument
- Parliament of the United Kingdom
- Citation: SI 2011/1072

Dates
- Made: 31 March 2011
- Commencement: 21 April 2011

Other legislation
- Made under: Transport and Works Act 1992

Text of statute as originally enacted

The construction of the flyover came about as part of a £47 million package into East Coast Main Line improvement work to reduce delays and increase capacity. Network Rail predicted that the flyover would decrease delays by 30,000 minutes/year. The plan for the flyover was set out in the Network Rail (Hitchin (Cambridge Junction)) Order 2011 (SI 2011/1072), which was a statutory instrument permitting its construction by Network Rail. It was published on 31 March and came into force on 21 April. In November 2011, the Department for Transport listed the flyover as an 'existing infrastructure project' in its annual National Infrastructure Plan, and expected that it would continue beyond Control Period 4, and therefore finish after 2014.

=== Construction ===
Construction was completed in June 2013. Original plans were to build the embankment using aggregate trucked in from elsewhere, but eventually it was decided to build up the embankment using chalk taken from the nearby Wilbury Hills, low-lying chalk hills forming part of the Chiltern Hills, from less than 1 mile (1.6 km) away, removing the need for lorry movements along public roads. The chalk was quarried from just beyond the ancient Icknield Way, which at this point is a public bridlepath between Ickleford and Letchworth Garden City, and the contractor was required to refill and replant the quarry afterwards.

In order to minimise disruption to the East Coast Main Line, the viaduct section was installed during night-time possessions of the railway, before installing crash decking which allowed work on the viaduct to continue during the day when the line below was active. After construction finished, poppy flowers grew along the chalk-based banks, leading to the embankment becoming known as "Poppy Bank".

On 18th April 2013, the chairman of the North Herts District Council planning committee announced that Network Rail had organised a charity walk in aid of the Garden House Hospice in Letchworth and Holy Saviours Church; this took place on 11th May 2013.

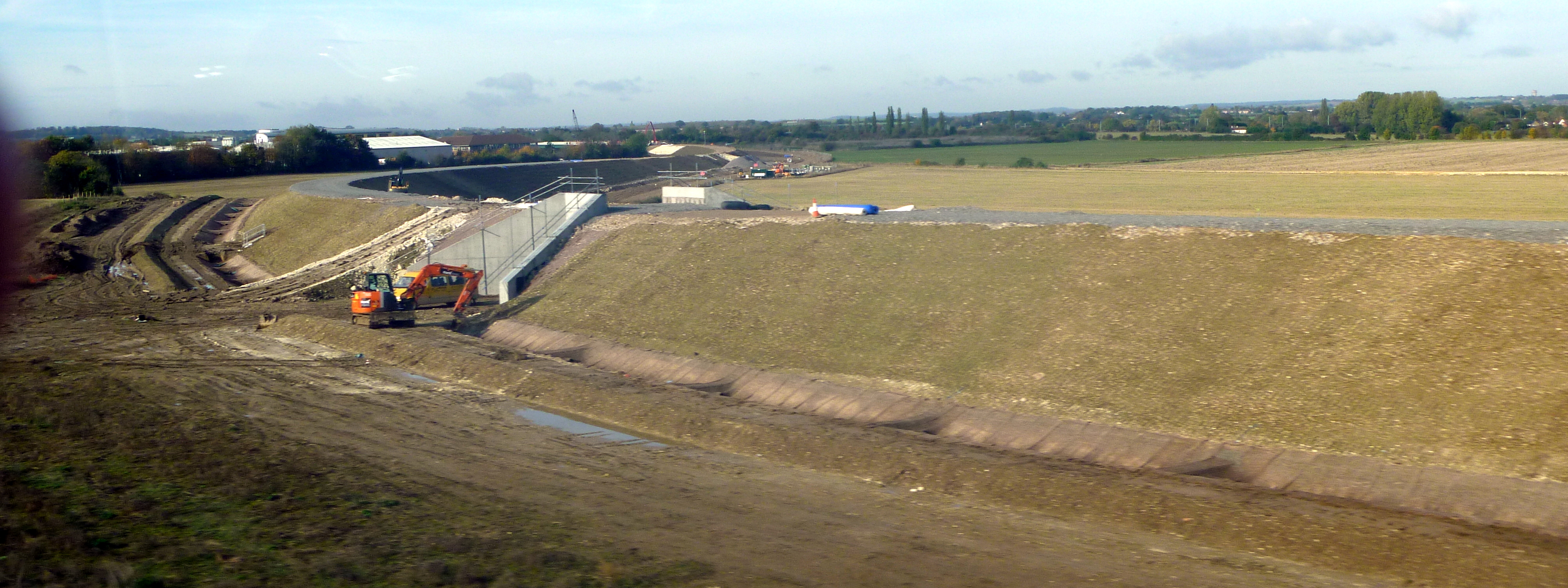
Hitchin flyover rail curve under construction in 2012

=== Operation ===
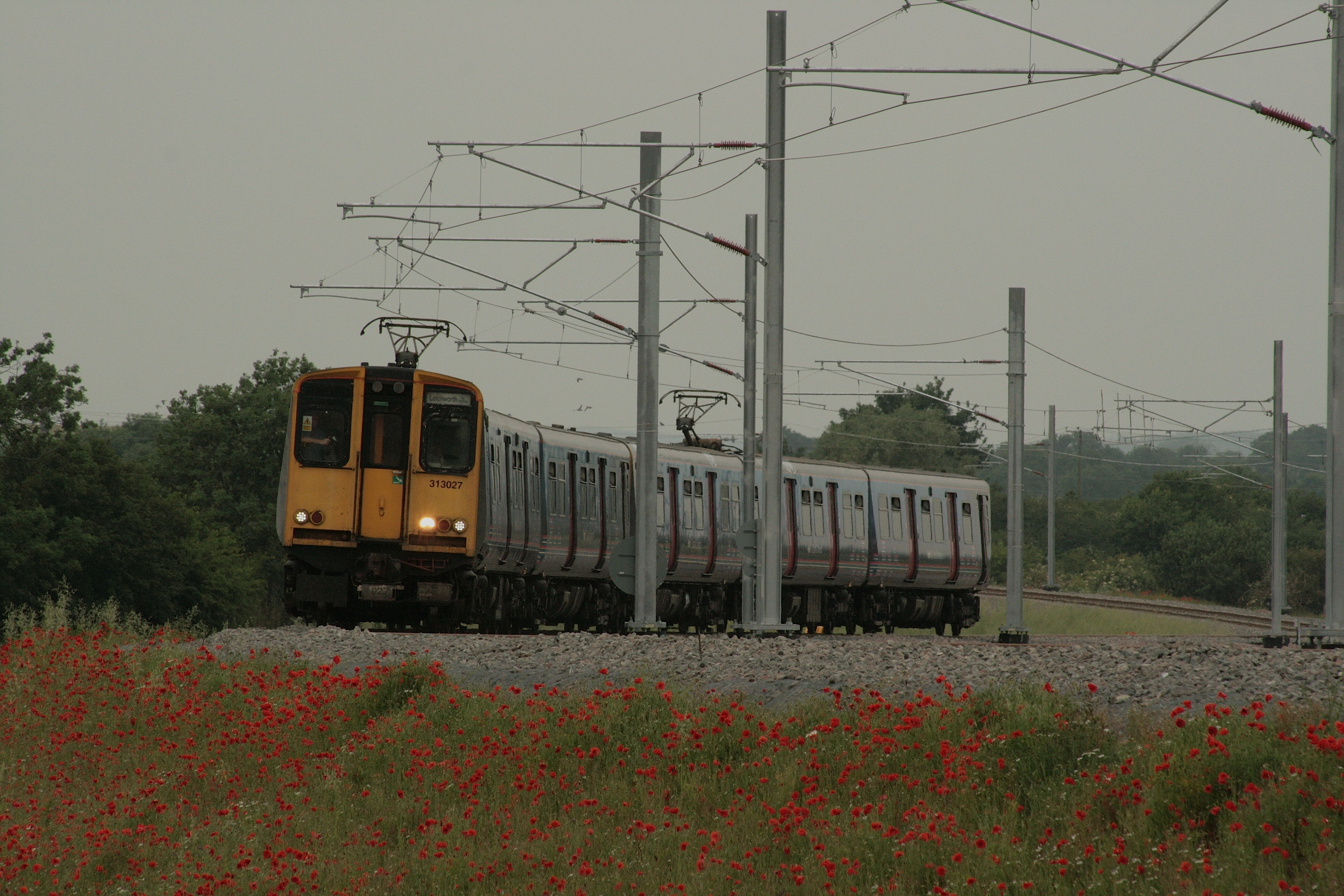
A First Capital Connect train on the embankment after the flyover, nicknamed 'Poppy Bank'.

Services on the flyover were reported to have begun on 26 June 2013. At first, only three First Capital Connect services used the flyover each day; however, by the December 2013 timetable change, three-hundred drivers had been trained in order to allow six-hundred services to use the flyover rather than the flat junction. As of the June 2025 working timetables, all scheduled passenger trains travelling between Hitchin and Letchworth are pathed on the Down Cambridge Flyover.

The introduction of the flyover increased journey times between Hitchin and Letchworth by approximately one minute; in contrast, southbound services were not affected as their route did not change. First Capital Connect amended their timetables for northbound trains to reflect this additional time. Today, the passenger services that use the flyover are operated by Thameslink and Great Northern, which are both sub-brands of Govia Thameslink Railway. However, London North Eastern Railway, Grand Central, Lumo, and Hull Trains all also run underneath the flyover, hence their services are improved by the lack of conflict with paths onto the Cambridge line.
