= Graham James (bishop) =

British Anglican bishop (born 1951)

The Right Reverend Graham James
- Bishop of Norwich
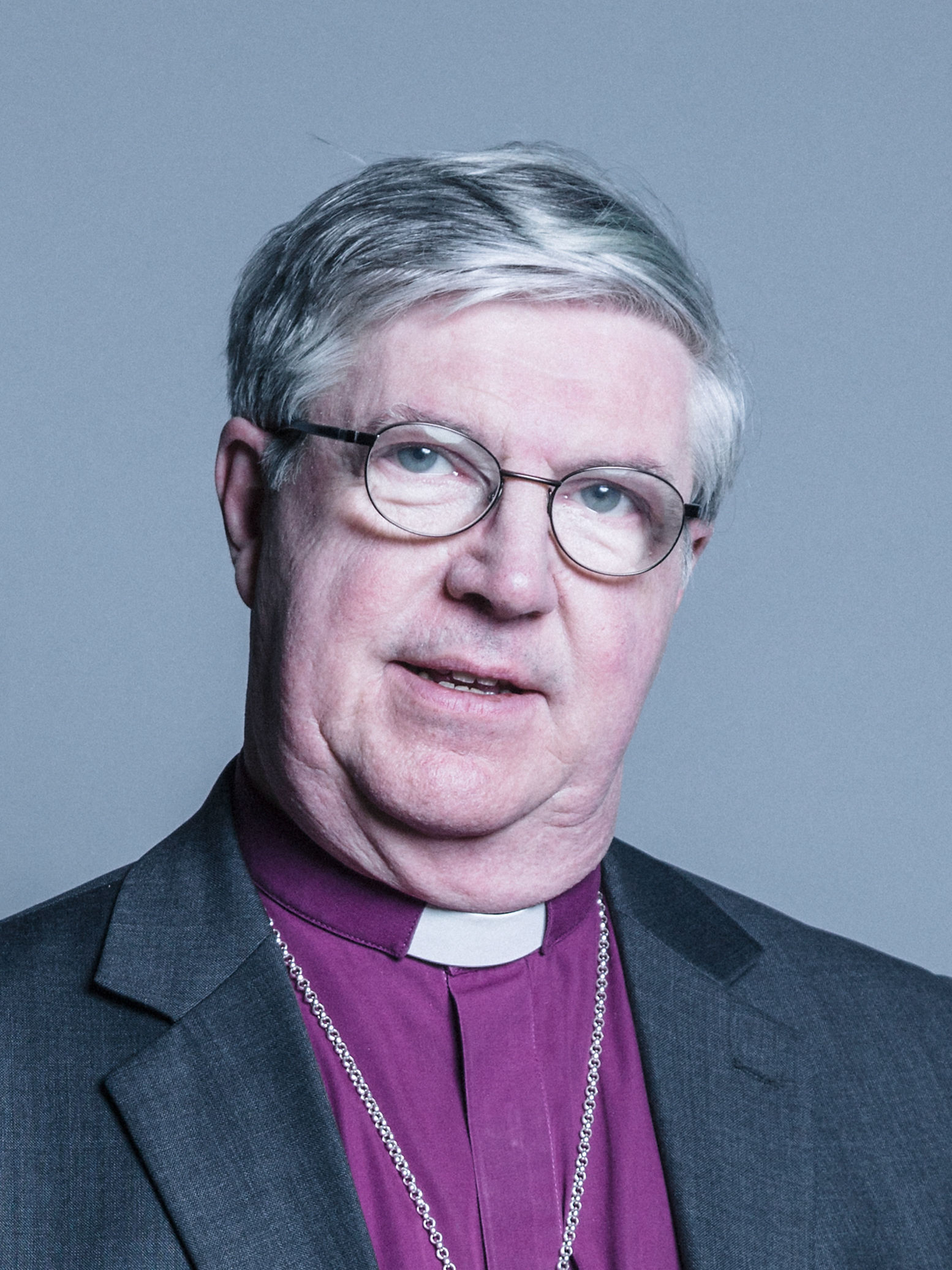
- Church: Church of England
- Diocese: Norwich
- In office: 1999–2019
- Predecessor: Peter Nott
- Successor: Graham Usher
- Other posts: Lord Spiritual (2004–2019); Bishop of St Germans (1993–1999)

Orders
- Ordination: 1975 (deacon); 1976 (priest) by Douglas Feaver
- Consecration: 23 February 1993 by George Carey

Personal details
- Born: 19 January 1951 (age 75) Bideford, Devon, United Kingdom
- Denomination: Anglican
- Residence: Bishop's House, Norwich
- Parents: Lionel & Florence James
- Spouse: Julie Freemantle (m. 1978)
- Children: 3 (one deceased)
- Education: Lancaster University

Member of the House of Lords
- Lord Spiritual
- Bishop of Norwich; 17 March 2004 – 28 February 2019

Graham Richard James (born 19 January 1951) is a retired British Anglican bishop. He was Bishop of Norwich in the Church of England from 1999 to 2019.

== Early life and education ==
James was born in Bideford, Devon, England, to the Revd Lionel and Florence James. He was educated at Northampton Grammar School, an all-boys school in Northampton. He studied at the University of Lancaster, graduating with a Bachelor of Arts (BA) degree in history in 1972. He trained for ordination at Cuddesdon Theological College from 1972 to 1975, and studied theology at the University of Oxford, completing a diploma in 1974.

== Ordained ministry ==
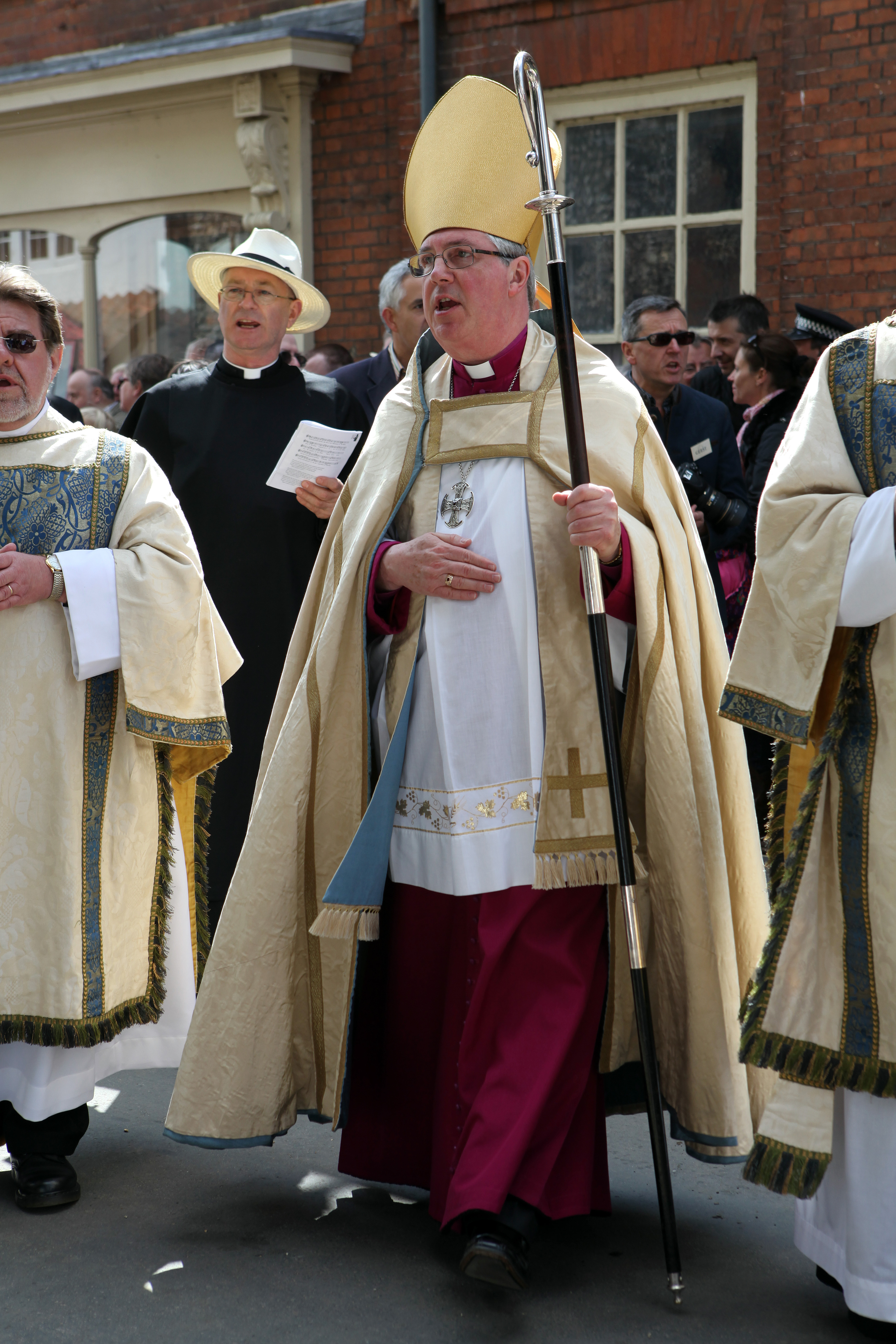
James during the National Pilgrimage to Walsingham, 2012

James was ordained deacon at Michaelmas 1975 (21 September) and priest the next Michaelmas (26 September 1976), both times by Douglas Feaver, Bishop of Peterborough, at Peterborough Cathedral. He was assistant curate of Christ the Carpenter Church, Dogsthorpe from 1975 to 1978. From there he moved to Christ the King, Digswell, from 1979 to 1983, became a member of the Advisory Council for the Church's Ministry in 1983 and held this post until 1987. Between 1983 and 1985, he was Selection Secretary and Secretary for Continuing Education and between 1985 and 1987 Senior Selection Secretary. He was chaplain to the Archbishop of Canterbury from 1987 to 1993.

=== Episcopal ministry ===
On 23 February 1993, James was consecrated a bishop by George Carey, Archbishop of Canterbury, at Westminster Abbey. He was the Bishop of St Germans in the Diocese of Truro from 1993 to 1999. From 1995 he was a member of the General Synod of the Church of England and from 1999 the 71st Bishop of Norwich. He was installed at Norwich Cathedral on 29 January 2000. In 2004, James became a Lord Spiritual and sat in the House of Lords. From 2006 he was a member of the Archbishops' Council and chair of the Ministry Division, Church of England. He chairs the BBC's Standing Conference on Religion and Belief.

James retired on 28 February 2019. He is a regular contributor to BBC Radio 4's Thought for the Day. Since late 2019, he has been licensed as an honorary assistant bishop in the Diocese of Truro.

== Other activities ==
James joined the House of Lords as a Lord Spiritual on 17 March 2004. In 2011, he became a member of the Lords Select Committee on Communications, and he was subsequently appointed spokesman for the Church of England on media issues. In 2019, he chaired the independent inquiry into the malpractice by surgeon Ian Paterson. He left the House of Lords on 28 February 2019.

== Personal life ==
James has been married to Julie since 1978. They have three children; one died in infancy.

== Styles ==
- The Reverend Graham James (1975–1993)
- The Right Reverend Graham James (1993–2019)

Church of England titles
Preceded by Richard Llewellin	Bishop of St Germans; 1993–1999	Succeeded by Roy Screech
Preceded by Peter Nott	Bishop of Norwich; 1999–2019	Succeeded by Graham Usher
