= Welwyn Tunnel rail crash =

1866 railway accident in Welwyn, England

- An illustration of the accident published in The Illustrated London News

Details
- Date: 9 June 1866; 23:36
- Location: Welwyn, Hertfordshire
- Coordinates: 51.836°N 0.186°W
- Country: England
- Line: East Coast Main Line
- Incident type: Collision
- Cause: Miscommunication between two signallers, guard failing to protect his train

Statistics
- Trains: 3
- Deaths: 2
- Injured: 2

The Welwyn Tunnel rail crash took place in Welwyn North Tunnel, north of Welwyn (now Welwyn North) station on the Great Northern Railway, on 9 June 1866. A Midland Railway goods train was given permission to enter the tunnel, where it ran into the back of an empty coal train, which had come to a stop after its engine failed. Before either of the involved trains' crew could inform the signal boxes, an express freight train was sent through the tunnel in the opposite direction, where it hit the wreckage.

The cause of the accident was a miscommunication between the Welwyn and Knebworth signallers over whether the failed train had reached Knebworth, which the enquiry blamed on the Welwyn signaller. The guard of the first train was also blamed, because he had failed to contact either signaller or place detonators on the track.

== Background ==
There are two tunnels between Welwyn station and Knebworth on the East Coast Main Line, known as Welwyn South Tunnel and Welwyn North Tunnel. In 1866, traffic through the tunnels was operated using a form of block working – the signalmen at Welwyn and Knebworth communicated with each other via a telegraph system, and were not permitted to signal a train into the tunnels until they had received confirmation that the previous train had cleared the section. The instrument was a "speaking" telegraph, which was used for general communication between the signal boxes.

At the time, the section of line was very congested and challenging to signal. The signallers on duty that night were James Bradford at Welwyn and Joseph Harding at Knebworth. At the time, the Midland Main Line to St Pancras railway station was yet to be opened, and so the traffic of the Midland Railway (MR) used the Great Northern Railway (GNR) line into King's Cross railway station, worsening congestion.

== Collision ==
The first train involved in the accident was a GNR freight service comprising 38 empty coal wagons, and hauled by a tender locomotive. The train was given permission to leave Welwyn (Welwyn North after 1926) heading north at 23:20 on 9 June 1866. While passing through the North Tunnel, whose gradient rises at 1 in 200 (5‰) in the train's direction, the engine failed and the train came to a stand, due to a burst boiler pipe which smothered the firebox. At first, Joseph Wray, the train's guard, recommended that the train be allowed to roll back on the falling gradient to Welwyn, but the driver refused, as such a move would be dangerous and against the GNR rules. According to regulations, Wray should have placed detonators on the line to protect the rear of his train, but he did not, and he also failed to communicate with either signal box.

At 23:36, the second train, a Midland Railway (MR) goods train from London with 26 wagons, passed Welwyn. The signalman there had not received the "out of section" signal for the first train, and so he sent a telegraph message to Knebworth box asking if it had cleared the tunnel. The Knebworth signalman stated to the official enquiry that he had replied with the code for "No", but the Welwyn signalman claimed that he had received a "Yes". He therefore cleared his signals and allowed the MR train into the tunnel. The code for "No" differed from the code for "Out" only by the number of beats on the telegraph needle, and the enquiry ruled that the Welwyn signalman had misinterpreted the signal as being "Out", which would have the same meaning as "Yes" in answer to his question.

The MR train ran into the GNR train at a speed estimated at 20–25 miles per hour (32–40 km/h). The driver had no warning of its presence, and the collision killed Wray whilst severely injuring Mr Rawlins, an employee of the Metropolitan Railway, who was travelling in the guard's van contrary to the GNR's regulations. Rawlins succumbed to his injuries and died on the morning of 12 June. The driver and fireman of the MR train were not seriously injured, but it took them some time to extricate themselves from the debris of the accident.

Before any of the railwaymen could communicate with either signal box, a third train, which was a GNR express freight train carrying meat from Scotland to Smithfield Market, was allowed into the tunnel heading in the opposite direction. The train hit the wreckage of the first collision and caught fire. Due to the difficulty of accessing the tunnel after the accident, and because it was directly beneath one of the tunnel's ventilation shafts, the fire was not extinguished until 11 June. According to Rolt, "all that night and all through the next day the ventilation shaft belched flames, smoke and the smell of roasting meat over the surrounding countryside".

== Investigation and consequences ==
According to L T C Rolt, "from the point of view of damage to engines and rolling stock it was one of the most destructive in railway history." The official inquest was held at the Cowper's Inn, next to Welwyn station (Welwyn North since 1926). The official report was produced by Captain Frederick Henry Rich of the Royal Engineers. Rich blamed the collision mainly on Guard Wray of the first train, for failing to protect the rear of his train after it had stopped, and for relying on the signals for protection in this situation. A jury did not find either of the signallers responsible for the deaths of Wray and Rawlins.

Rich recommended two changes to the signalling method, which were subsequently adopted as part of absolute block working: before a train is allowed into a section, the signalman must request clearance from the next box ahead, rather than relying on the "out of section" message for the previous train; and a separate block telegraph that permanently displays the state of the section should be used, in addition to the general-purpose "speaking" telegraph.

== Similar accidents ==
- Clayton Tunnel rail crash (1861)
- Norton Fitzwarren rail crash (1890)
- Winwick rail crash (1934)

== See also ==
- List of rail accidents in the United Kingdom
