= Woolmer Green =

Village in Hertfordshire, England

Coordinates: 51.85226°N 0.18005°W

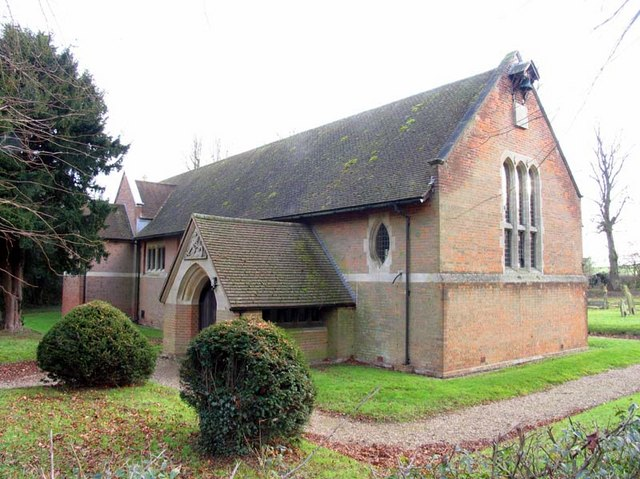
- St Michael and All Angels, Woolmer Green, by Robert Weir Schultz

- Location within Hertfordshire
- Population: 661 (2011 Census)
- OS grid reference: TL253186
- District: Welwyn Hatfield
- Shire county: Hertfordshire
- Region: East
- Country: England
- Sovereign state: United Kingdom
- Post town: KNEBWORTH
- Postcode district: SG3
- Dialling code: 01438
- Police: Hertfordshire
- Fire: Hertfordshire
- Ambulance: East of England
- UK Parliament: Welwyn Hatfield

Woolmer Green is a small village and civil parish in Hertfordshire, England. The 2011 census figure for the population (from the Office for National Statistics) is 661 people.

== History ==
Situated between the villages of Welwyn and Knebworth, Woolmer Green was first settled in the Iron Age. The Belgae colonised the area in the 1st century BC, and later it was settled by the Romans. Many Roman artefacts have been found in the surrounding area with a bath house existing at nearby Welwyn. The village was at the junction of two thoroughfares, the Great North Road and another road called Stane Street (or Stone Street) from St Albans. The route of this road runs across the parish along the path of Robbery Bottom Lane, continuing on as a public bridleway to Datchworth and then Braughing, on its eventual way to another major Roman town, Camulodonum, Colchester.

Thomas de Wolvesmere is recorded as having lived in a dwelling here in 1297, and his name is considered to have led to the current name of the village. In the Middle Ages part of the village was in Mardleybury Manor, part in Rectory Manor, with the northern part owing allegiance to Broadwater Manor or Knebworth. The village remains at the point where the Districts of North Hertfordshire, East Hertfordshire and Welwyn Hatfield meet.

Apart from the trade generated by travellers, life in Woolmer Green was agricultural and feudal until the middle of the nineteenth century. Things started to change, however, when the railway arrived in 1850 (although the nearby station in Knebworth was not opened until 1884 after intervention from Viscount Knebworth). The village school, which was opened a few years after this, obtained much funding from the railway.

In 1863, only a gunsmith and a shoemaker were listed in the trade directory. By 1898, when the population of Woolmer Green stood at 363 and that of Knebworth at 382, there were five shops including two beer retailers; no mention in the trade directory of the many 'front room shops'! This level of service persisted until recent years with a general store and Post Office, a baker, a small supermarket and a butcher. These have all now closed. The former Post office was later used as a hair salon, a furniture shop and a wedding dress and suit hire shop which was opened in early 2016.

The main road through the centre of the village was the A1 - the Great North Road down which thousands of cattle and sheep were driven 'on the hoof' to London markets each year. The area around Knebworth and Woolmer Green provided what was probably the last overnight stop for the animals and their drovers before they reached London. The majority of the residents of Woolmer Green were dependent on farming and the 1879 harvest, which was the worst of the century, resulted in the leases of many farms in the area being relinquished, and thus labourers not being employed to work on them. At this time there was quite an influx of farmers from Scotland and Cornwall. They must have considered the prospects here to be better than their own, and indeed they were actively lured here by the owners of the local agricultural land, which at that time was largely owned by the big land-owning estates, particularly in this immediate area by the Knebworth Estate.

== The Woodcarver and his house ==
With the development of motor traffic during the 20th century the village became well known to travellers to and from London on the A1. In particular travellers along the road could not have missed the eccentric and colourful cottage inhabited by the late Harry McDonald, who for many years adorned both the cottage and its garden with inventive carvings of animals and other objects. For a small fee visitors could walk through the garden with its nursery-rhyme and Middle Eastern themed sculptures, many of which were animated by handles, pumps, windmills and various levers. McDonald also carved several official local village signs, and sold his more academically carved work to passing visitors.

Harry McDonald arrived in Woolmer Green in 1937, having walked from his home town of Bradford in Yorkshire, seeking work. He became known as the Woodcarver of Woolmer Green. It was subject of a short British Pathe feature in 1955 narrated by Eamonn Andrews. The Woodcarvers Cottage, as it came to be known, was demolished after his death in 1971, although a commemorative plaque was erected in 2010. In 1982 a horse-drawn theatre production 'The Woodcarver Story' by Horse and Bamboo Theatre arrived in the village. They erected a marquee and over several nights performed a production about Harry McDonald's life. On the final night the entire cast and audience made a procession to McDonald's grave in the churchyard. Harry McDonald is buried at the nearby church of St Michael and All Angels.

== Woolmer Green independence ==
Prior to the millennium year, 2000, Woolmer Green was part of the parish of Welwyn for local government purposes. In that year, however, the parish gained its independence from its neighbour, and the inaugural meeting of the Parish Council was held in May 2000. The first chairman of the new Woolmer Green Parish Council, Judith Watson, was instrumental in achieving the separation.

== The railway through Woolmer Green ==
The boundary between Woolmer Green and Welwyn parishes is formed by the path of the East Coast Main Line railway. The small viaduct to the south of the Parish, at the end of Robbery Bottom Lane, follows the same basic design as the long Digswell Viaduct. It was designed by William Cubitt and built by Thomas Brassey between 1848 and 1850 for the sum of £4,643. There are seven arches with a height above the roadway of 17m and a length of 60m. The viaduct and the bridges over London Road and Heath Road are all original, dating from when the railway was first built, although they have been strengthened and the parapets raised.

Immediately to the south of the viaduct the railway enters the first of two tunnels (with a very short open section in the middle) between Woolmer Green and the station at Welwyn North. The first tunnel heading south was the site of a notorious accident in 1866.

There was a temporary railway halt at Woolmer Green during the war which was used by soldiers, but nowadays the nearest station is just down the road at Knebworth, built in 1884 at the request of Viscount Knebworth. Until then the railway was used as a means of transferring manure from all the stables in London to a convenient place in the country. Chutes were constructed so that the manure could be shovelled down on to the roads and the local farmers then picked it up to use as fertiliser.

== Woolmer Green Village Hall ==
The parish has an excellent modern Village Hall and adjoining sports field which are very actively used by the community. The hall was opened in November 1990 by local celebrity Barry Norman and is licensed for wedding ceremonies.

== St Michael and All Angels Church ==
Though Sunday services had been held in the school since 1878, many people in Woolmer Green wanted the village to have its own church. This was a wish particularly dear to the heart of the Revd Edwin Hoskyns, who was a curate at Welwyn when part of the school was consecrated as a church.

The problem of finding a suitable site for the new church, which was to be dedicated to St Michael and All Angels, was soon solved when Lord Lytton presented the Church authorities with the plot of land at the junction of London Road and Mardleybury Road, which was to prove an ideal site with easy access for the majority of the villagers. The church was designed by Robert Weir Schultz (1860–1951), a modest example of late Arts and Crafts. The estimated cost was £2500 and the contract was given to Mr E Lawrence of Datchworth. The foundation stone was laid in September 1899 by Lady Lytton who used a silver trowel for the task.

It was originally felt that the church should have a tower but it proved impossible to raise the necessary funds. By October 1899 only £1500 had been promised so the decision was taken that only the walls and the roof of the church should be built, and the internal fittings left to be proceeded with as the money came in. It was suggested in the Parish Magazine that the children of the parish should contribute towards the cost of the font: ‘Each can give very little, but the pennies and halfpennies of 350 children will quickly mount up, and all alike will feel they have a share in the new building.’

The church was to be named St Michael and All Angels in the hope that it would be consecrated at Michaelmas, 29 September 1900. However, it was not until 3 November 1900 that the consecration of the church and burial ground took place. The people of the village no longer needed to ‘marry and bury’ at Datchworth or Welwyn.

The church screen is a significant example of late Arts-and-Crafts design and carving. It is said that the school bell was bought for the church in 1931 at a cost of £10.
