= KBW =

KBW may refer to:

- KBW, the National Rail station code for Knebworth railway station, North Hertfordshire, England
- Korpus Bezpieczeństwa Wewnętrznego or Internal Security Corps, a Polish military organization
- Kommunistischer Bund Westdeutschland, the Communist League of West Germany
- Keefe, Bruyette & Woods, an investment bank
- Kevin Bloody Wilson, Australian comedy musician
