= James Treasure =

British Anglican bishop (born 1975)

The Rt Revd James Treasure BSc
- Bishop of St Germans
- Church: Church of England
- Diocese: Diocese of Truro
- Installed: 2026
- Predecessor: Hugh Nelson

Orders
- Ordination: 2017
- Consecration: 1 May 2026

Personal details
- Denomination: Anglican
- Education: Roehampton Institute

James Treasure (born 1975) is a British Anglican bishop. He is currently the Bishop of St Germans.

== Early life and education ==
He was educated at Roehampton Institute and Ripon College Cuddesdon.

== Ordained ministry ==
He was ordained in 2017. After curacies in Kidderminster and Dudley, in 2023 he became Team Rector of Dudley.

On 9 March 2026, it was announced that he was to become Bishop of St Germans in the Diocese of Truro. He was consecrated as a bishop on 1 May 2026 during a service in Truro Cathedral.
