= Bishop of St Germans =

Anglican suffragan bishop in England

The Bishop of St Germans is an episcopal title which was used by Anglo Saxon Bishops of Cornwall and currently in use in the Church of England and in the Roman Catholic Church.

The title is used by suffragan bishops of the Church of England, and is currently used by a suffragan bishop assistant to the Bishop of Truro of the Diocese of Truro. In the Roman Catholic Church, Sanctus Germanus is a titular see, used as the title for a bishop who is not in charge of a diocese.

The title takes its name after St Germans, a large village in Cornwall. In the 10th and 11th centuries, St Germans Priory was effectively the seat for the bishopric of Cornwall. In 1043, dioceses of Cornwall and Crediton merged under one bishop, and eventually they moved to Exeter in 1050.

== List of Anglican bishops ==
Bishops of St Germans
From	Until	Incumbent	Notes
1905	1918	John Cornish	
1918	1974	in abeyance	
1974	1979	Richard Rutt	Translated to Leicester
1979	1985	Br Michael (Fisher) SSF	
1985	1992	Richard Llewellin	Translated to Dover
1993	1999	Graham James	Translated to Norwich
2000	2011	Roy Screech	
2013	2019	Chris Goldsmith	Consecrated 14 May, installed 19 May 2013; resigned September 2019.
2020	2025	Hugh Nelson	Consecrated 15 July 2020. Translation to Worcester announced 27 July 2025.
2026	present	James Treasure	Consecrated 1 May 2026

== List of Catholic bishops ==
Bishops of Sanctus Germanus
From	Until	Incumbent	Notes
12 Feb 1970	10 Dec 1970	Pierre-Marie Théas, Bishop emeritus of Tarbes-et-Lourdes	Resigned titular See
2 Feb 1972	31 Oct 1974	James McGuinness, Bishop coadjutor of Nottingham	Succeeded to the diocesan See of Nottingham
24 Jan 1976	27 Apr 2013	Joseph O'Connell, Auxiliary Bishop (later emeritus) of Melbourne	Retired 2006, retaining titular See until death.
31 Mar 2014	29 Nov 2025	Nicholas Hudson, Auxiliary Bishop of Westminster	Appointed to the diocesan see of Plymouth
