= Chris Goldsmith =

British Anglican bishop (born 1954)

The Right Reverend Chris Goldsmith
- Director of Ministry
- Church: Church of England
- In office: 2019–present
- Other posts: Bishop of St Germans (2013–2019); Acting Bishop of Truro (2017–2018)

Orders
- Ordination: 2000 (deacon); 2001 (priest)
- Consecration: 14 May 2013 by Justin Welby

Personal details
- Born: Christopher David Goldsmith; 1954 (age 71–72)
- Denomination: Anglican
- Spouse: Ellen
- Children: two
- Profession: Biochemist and clergyman
- Education: University of York

Christopher David Goldsmith (called Chris; born October 1954) is a British Anglican bishop who has been the Church of England's national Director of Ministry since 2019. From 2013 until 2019, he was the Bishop of St Germans, the sole suffragan bishop of the Diocese of Truro, Church of England; he was additionally acting Bishop of Truro from 2017 to 2018.

== Early life ==
Goldsmith was born in 1954. He was educated at Dartford Grammar School, a state all-boys grammar school in Dartford, Kent. He studied biochemistry at the University of York, graduating with a Bachelor of Arts (BA) degree in 1976 and a Doctor of Philosophy (PhD) degree in 1979.

== Career ==
=== Business career ===
For 25 years, Goldsmith worked in the oil and gas industry. He worked for Shell International in Kent, Essex, Amsterdam and London. He began his career as a research scientist before moving into human resources and management roles.

=== Religious career ===
Goldsmith began his ministry in the Church of England when he was made a reader in 1984. He completed his training for ordained ministry with the North Thames Ministerial Training Course, studying part-time between 1997 and 2000. This probably makes him the first bishop to be course-trained, rather than through a traditional theological college.

Goldsmith was ordained in the Church of England as a deacon in 2000 and as a priest in 2001. He served his curacy at Pitsea with Nevendon, in the Diocese of Chelmsford. Pitsea is a deprived area of Essex and he found himself to be one of only a few professionals in the area. Between 2004 and 2013, he served as vicar of Warley Christ Church and St Mary the Virgin, Great Warley.

In March 2013, it was announced that he would succeed Roy Screech as the seventh Bishop of St Germans. On 14 May 2013, he was consecrated bishop by Justin Welby, Archbishop of Canterbury, during a service held at Southwark Cathedral. A service of welcome was held at Truro Cathedral on 19 May. He has also served as the Diocesan Warden of Readers since 2013.

In June 2019, it was announced that Goldsmith is to resign his See to become the Church of England's national Director of Ministry in September 2019. He resigned the See on 29 September 2019.

== Personal life ==
Goldsmith is married to Ellen who is also an ordained priest. Together they have two children.
