= Digswell House =

House in Welwyn Garden City, Hertfordshire, England

Coordinates: 51.8187°N 0.2061°W

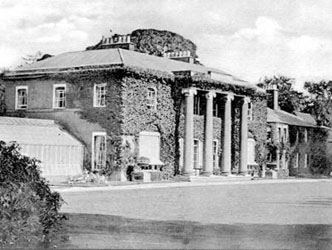
Digswell House c. 1905

Digswell House is a Grade II listed country house in Hertfordshire, erected c. 1805–1807 by Samuel Wyatt for the Edward Spencer Cowper, who lived there for some years. It was built in the parish of Digswell from which it takes its name, but was transferred to Welwyn Garden City in 1921. The house is now in the Knightsfield area of Welwyn Garden City. The current house was erected a little eastward of the site on which its predecessor had stood and was built as a commodious country gentleman's home, in an architectural style that can best be described as neoclassical. A portico, with four massive Ionic columns, on the south front is its most impressive external feature.

== History ==
An old manor house west of the present-day Digswell House was built by Sir John Peryent in the early 15th century. The old manor house was subsequently inhabited by the families of Peryent, Horsey, Sedley and Shallcross. Capability Brown created some of the landscape work at Digswell between 1771 and 1773.

The medieval manor house was purchased in 1785 by George Clavering-Cowper, 3rd Earl Cowper and as it was in poor condition was then demolished in 1805 to make way for a new mansion.

The house was occupied by Henry Pearse, a West India merchant with his wife Mary and daughters Mary Louisa, Julia Charlotte, Alice Jane and sons Cosmo Brice and Ernest Charles and a full house of staff as shown in the 1851 census. He also resided at No. 8, Finsbury-place South, in the City of London. He was later declared bankrupt on 17 June 1854.

The house was owned by Phoebe Tatham the wife of William Smith Brown. Phoebe Tatham had inherited wealth from Duncan Dunbar following his death when still a bachelor in 1862. Dunbar had been one of the largest shipping magnates in the British Empire having built up the Dunbar Line of trading and convict ships. Phoebe was his niece, the elder daughter of Dunbar's sister Justina and her husband, Poplar surgeon Christopher Tatham. William and Phoebe had eight children. Phoebe died at Digswell 23 February 1891 and William died 31 December 1891 at Portsea Island.

At this time the house was owned by the Aclands who gave over its use during the First World War Digswell House served as the Number 5 Australian Auxiliary Hospital and nursing home for wounded Australian soldiers though Belgian and British soldiers also stayed there. It was staffed by the Red Cross from local families. The grounds of Digswell house provided a centre for sports for those soldiers who could compete as can be seen in photographs from this period. A letter published in 1917 sums up the situation at the time.

The Hon. Mrs. Acland, owner of Digswell House, has generously given up her home to convalescent Australians, the house accommodating about 25 officers. Her husband, Colonel Acland, is at the front, also her only son, Lieut. Acland, with the Grenadier Guards. Her eldest daughter is also nursing in France. Truly a patriotic family! The grounds are very extensive, and include a small lake: Plenty of shooting is available for those able to get about. A batch of Australian officers will be leaving Digswell House next week for Australia, two of whom (shot through the stomach) have some way yet to go for recovery.

After the war, the house was then purchased by Ebenezer Howard in 1919. From 1928 to 1939 it functioned as a conference centre with good connections to London through local railway transport. Notable guests have included Mahatma Gandhi, George Bernard Shaw, Paul Robeson, Lord Beaverbrook and Hugh Gaitskell and other leading politicians and intellectuals of the time. The Trades Union Congress held a weekend school for women in 1935.

After the Second World War Digswell House served as a boarding house and a place of retreat. Between 1955 and 1957 Digswell House was the Boarding House for Sherrardswood School.

Notable visitors include Henry Moore who was one of the inspiring figures in the creation of the trust. It remained a retreat for artists until 1985 when Digswell House was sold and turned into a collection of private dwellings. The Digswell Arts Trust continues to this day but has moved to another site.

== Notable residents ==
=== Old house ===
- Sir John Peryent
- Thomas Shallcross an ardent royalist famed for having alerted Queen Anne to anti-royalist plots.

=== Current house ===
- Hon. Edward Spencer 1806
- Sir John Mansfield son of Right Honourable James Mansfield, Lord Chief Justice of the Pleas 1804–1814
- Sir John Norton
- Thomas Powney Marten, of Marshal's Wick, Sandridge, Esq.
- William Smith Brown, Esq
- Sir Alfred Reynolds JP, Chairman of Welwyn Bench and Herts Quarter Sessions 1910–11
- Col Alfred Dyke Acland CBE resided until 1925
