= John Cornish =

British Anglican bishop

The Right Reverend John Rundle Cornish
- Bishop of St Germans
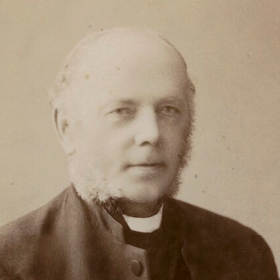
- John Rundle Cornish, circa 1915
- Church: Anglican
- Province: Province of Canterbury
- Diocese: Diocese of Truro
- Elected: 1905

Personal details
- Born: October 7, 1837
- Died: April 20, 1918 (aged 80)
- Education: Sidney Sussex College, Cambridge

John Rundle Cornish (7 October 1837 – 20 April 1918) was an Anglican bishop, the inaugural Bishop of St Germans from 1905 to 1918.

Born on 7 October 1837 he was educated at Sidney Sussex College, Cambridge, where he was 14th Wrangler in 1859. He was a Lecturer then Fellow at the College before studying for ordination. His subsequent appointments included a period as Vicar of Kenwyn, the post of Principal of Truro Training College and Archdeacon of Cornwall before a 15-year stint as a suffragan bishop as the inaugural Bishop of St Germans. He died on 20 April 1918 and a school (the Bishop Cornish C of E VA Primary School) in the locality is named after him. After Cornish's death the bishopric of St Germans remained dormant for 56 years.

== Notes ==
Church of England titles
Preceded by Inaugural appointment	Bishop of St Germans; 1905 – 1918	Succeeded by In abeyance until 1974
