= Roy Screech =

British bishop

The Rt Revd Roy Screech BD AKC
- Bishop of St Germans
- Church: Church of England
- Diocese: Diocese of Truro
- Installed: c. 2000
- Term ended: 31 December 2011 (retirement)
- Predecessor: Graham James
- Successor: Chris Goldsmith

Orders
- Ordination: 1976
- Consecration: 17 March 2000

Personal details
- Born: 15 May 1953 (age 73)
- Denomination: Anglican
- Spouse: Angela Waring (1980—present)
- Children: unknown
- Education: King's College London

Clive Royden Screech (born 15 May 1953) is a former Bishop of St Germans in the Diocese of Truro.

Screech was educated at Cotham Grammar School and King's College London. He was ordained in 1976 and was a curate at Hatcham followed by incumbencies at Nunhead, Addington and Camberwell (where he was rural dean) before his ordination to the episcopate.

Screech has been married to Angela (née Waring) since 1980 and is a keen opera fan.

== Styles ==
- Roy Screech Esq (1953–1976)
- The Revd Roy Screech (1976–2000)
- The Rt Revd Roy Screech (2000—present)

Church of England titles
Preceded by Graham James	Bishop of St Germans; 2000–2011	Succeeded by Chris Goldsmith
