= Potters Bar Tunnel =

Railway tunnel in Hertfordshire

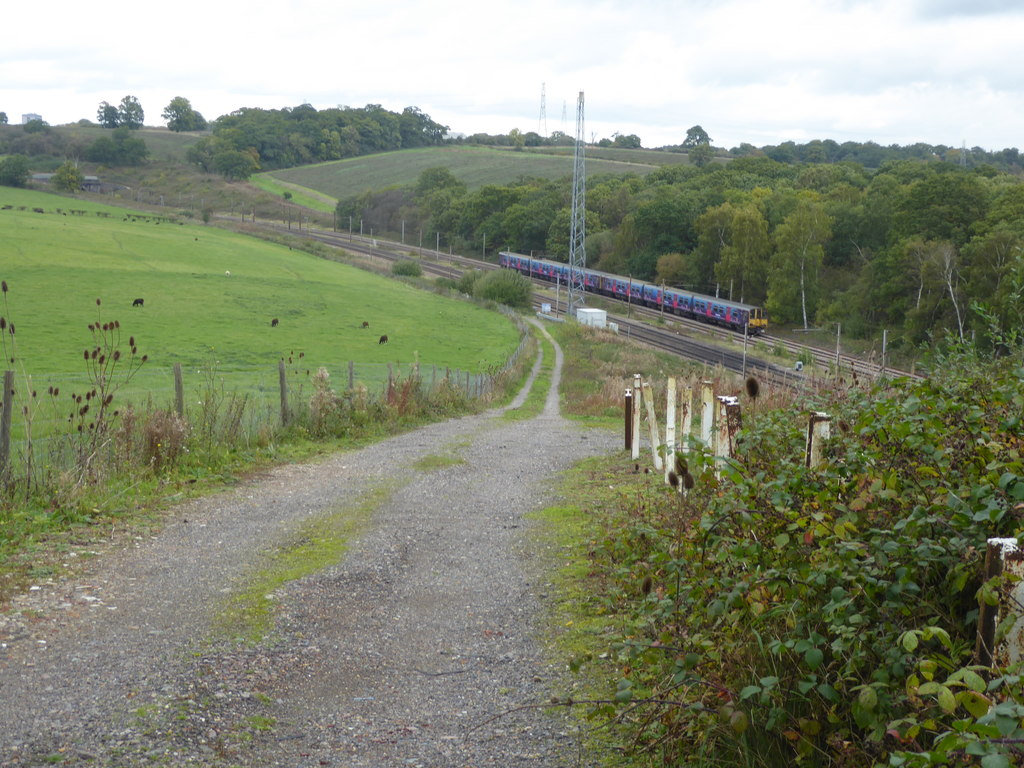
- A train in the cutting between the Potters Bar Tunnel (L) and the Hadley Wood North Tunnel (R). The tunnel mouth of the former can be faintly made out on the very left.
- Interactive map of Potters Bar Tunnel

Overview
- Line: East Coast Main Line
- Location: Potters Bar, Hertfordshire
- Coordinates: 51°41′0″N 0°10′50″W
- Status: Operational
- System: National Rail

Operation
- Constructed: First bore: 1850; Second bore: 1955–1959
- Owner: Network Rail
- Operator: See East Coast Main Line § Operators

Technical
- Design engineer: Thomas Brassey
- Length: 1,214 yd (1,110 m)
- No. of tracks: 4
- Track gauge: 4 ft 8 1/2 in (1,435 mm) standard gauge
- Electrified: 25 kV 50 Hz AC
- Operating speed: Fast tracks: Down, 115 mph (185 km/h); Up, 105 mph (169 km/h). Slow tracks: 75 mph (121 km/h)

The Potters Bar Tunnel is a railway tunnel on the East Coast Main Line in the United Kingdom between Hadley Wood and Potters Bar railway stations; at 1,214 yards (1,110 metres) in length, it is the longest on the line. Its two parallel bores carry four tracks beneath high terrain and the M25 motorway. The lines tolerate speeds of 75 miles per hour (121 kilometres per hour) on the slow tracks and 105 mph (169 km/h) and 115 mph (185 km/h) on the fast tracks, with a continual gradient 1 in 200 (5‰), which is uphill for trains heading away from London.

The first bore of the tunnel was finished in time for the opening of the line in August 1850. Despite permission having been granted by Parliament in 1882, a second bore was not opened until 1959.

== Design ==
The Potters Bar Tunnel consists of two parallel bores, which carry the four tracks of the East Coast Main Line (ECML); each bore contains two tracks for one direction of travel, towards (Up) or away (Down) from London King's Cross. Both of the tunnel bores are 1,214 yards (1.1 km) in length, and are situated 11 miles 25 chains (11.31 miles, 18.21 km) to 12 miles 00 chains (12.00 miles, 19.31 km) from the zero point at London King's Cross railway station, from where mileage on the ECML is measured. The tunnel lies at the northern end of the longest section of the ECML with a constant gradient, with the line having risen at a 1 in 200 (5‰) gradient for 8 miles (13 km) by the northern portal. This makes the northern end of the tunnel the highest point on the line between London and Newcastle upon Tyne. The tunnel, along with the other eight between King's Cross and Peterborough, is perfectly straight, unlike most of the line. This is because curved tunnels were not possible with the technology of the time.

The speed limit through the tunnel is 75 miles per hour (121 km/h) on the two slow tracks, 105 miles per hour (169 km/h) on the Up Fast track, and 115 miles per hour (185 km/h) on the Down Fast track. The speed limit then drops to 65 miles per hour (105 km/h) and 100 miles per hour (160 km/h) on the Down Slow and Fast tracks, respectively, at the southern portal of the tunnel. The northern end of the tunnel lies at the start of Potters Bar, meaning that the railway line then cuts directly through the town and restricts east–west travel. However, a footpath does pass over the tunnel mouth. The next tunnel up the line is the Hadley Wood North Tunnel and the next tunnel down the line is the Welwyn South Tunnel.

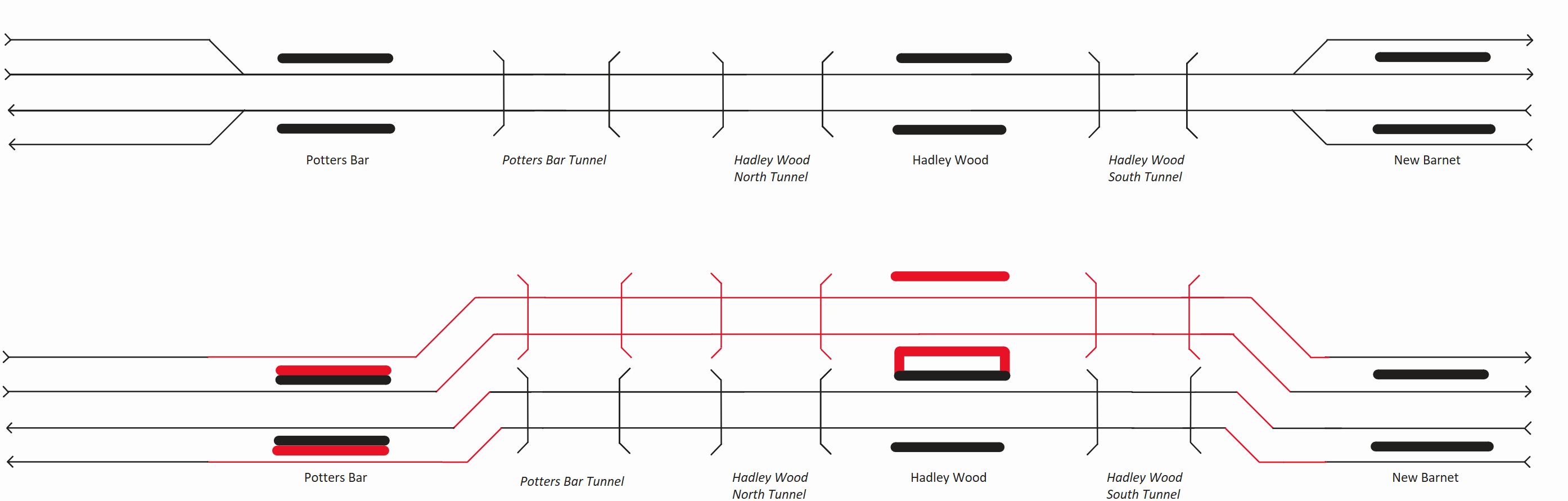
The design of the section between New Barnet and Potters Bar, before 1955 (top) and after the 1955–1959 works (bottom). The additions and realignments are shown in red.

== History ==
=== First bore ===
The British engineer Thomas Brassey was in charge of the construction of the Great Northern Railway between Hornsey and Peterborough. The construction of the tunnel and line through Potters Bar occurred long before the town was chosen to have a station, and Brassey set up his own brickworks near the tunnel site. The company established stores locally, and illegally paid the workers with vouchers they could only use at those stores. This portion of line and the tunnel were completed by February 1850, although the Potters Bar and South Mimms station was still incomplete when the line opened. The original name for the tunnel was the South Mimms Tunnel.

The original railway was entirely two tracks but was soon quadrupled to increase capacity. While an Act of Parliament passed in 1882 permitted this work to end at the northern end of the Potters Bar Tunnel, none of the three tunnels between Hadley Wood and Potters Bar were actually quadrupled due to the high costs of tunnelling second bores. It was due to this that Potters Bar was not able to have as frequent a service as the stations further south, preventing its expansion. A plan existed to quadruple the section at latest by 1892, but the decision was taken to extend the Hertford Loop line to Stevenage as an alternative route instead.

=== Second bore ===
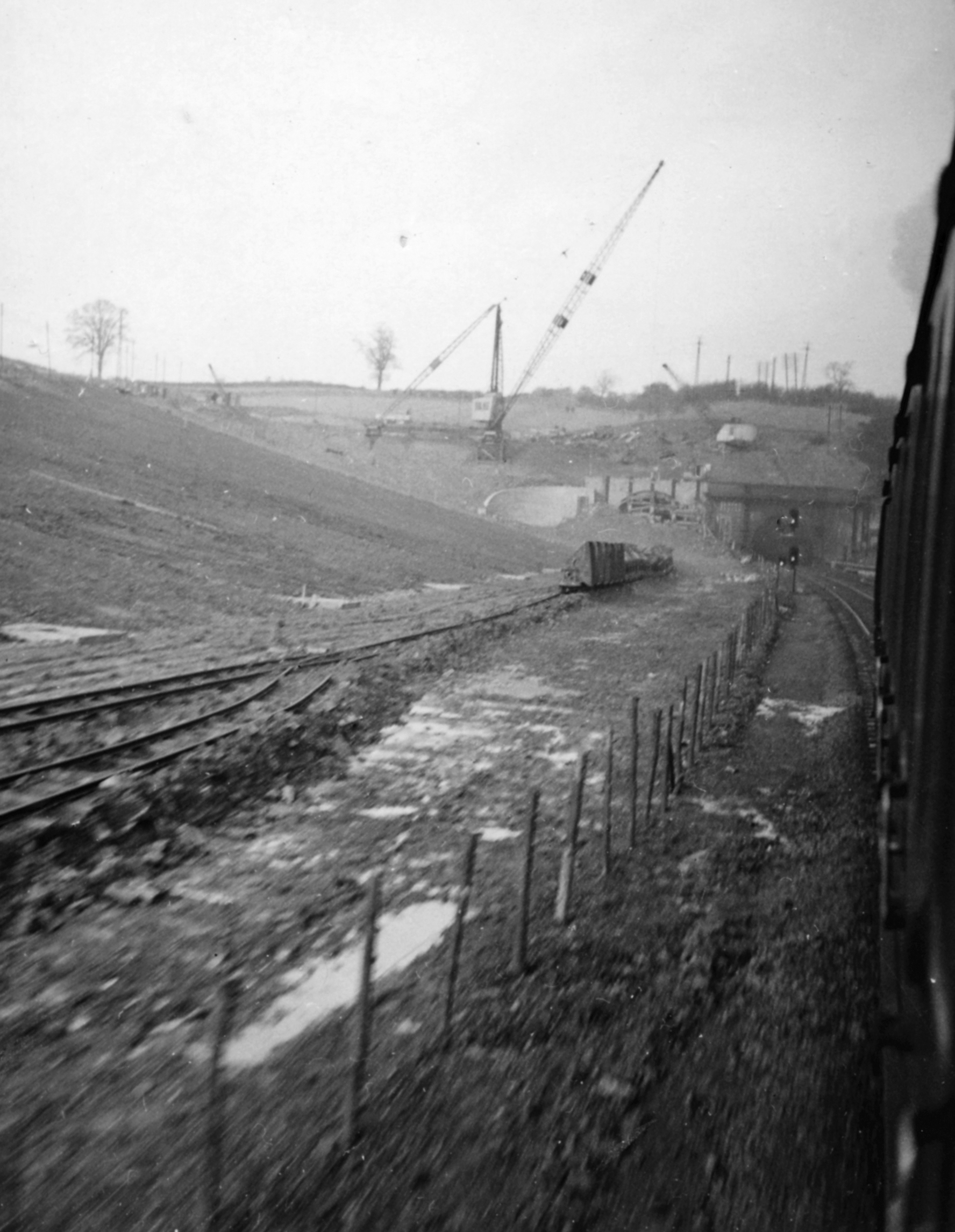
Widening work taking place at Hadley Wood North Tunnel in 1957, as part of the same project

External images
- Electrification work at the now double-bore tunnel, 1980s
- An LNER HST leaving the tunnel, c. 2018

The construction of the second bore had been permitted by the original Act of Parliament, so it was carried out based on the permission sought 77 years beforehand. The works were the first instance of clay tunnel boring on the UK railways since works on the Hertford Loop line in 1914, 45 years earlier. The project was approved by the British Transport Commission on 30 April 1953, with construction beginning on 16 June 1955. The new tunnels were designed by William Halcrow.

The works were carried out while the adjacent extant tracks were still live with no barrier in between; however, a temporary speed limit in the area of 15 miles per hour (24 km/h) was created. The main problems faced by the contractors were that the tunnel had to be installed while other parts were still being excavated due to the weakness of the London Clay, and that the deposited spoil was unstable and shifted over time. They overcame the latter problem by compressing the soil between excavating and dumping it. As there were no longer many skilled bricklayers available by the 1950s, precast concrete blocks were used instead, and a form of tunnelling shield was used both for digging out the spoil and for placing the concrete blocks and tunnel lining.

The tunnel was officially opened on 20 May 1959, and the success of its construction techniques were applied by the London Transport Executive to their plans for the Victoria line. At the time they were building experimental tunnel sections with similar techniques, while they awaited final approval for the entire line's construction. The total cost of the project, including all three tunnels, was £2.5 million, equivalent to £51,000,000 in 2025.

The first section of what is now the M25 motorway, then known as the M16, opened between South Mimms and Potters Bar in September 1975; the Potters Bar Tunnel runs beneath this section. As of March 2026, the operators passing through the Potters Bar Tunnel include Grand Central, Great Northern and Thameslink, Hull Trains, London North Eastern Railway, and Lumo.

== See also ==
- Copenhagen Tunnel
- Barnet Tunnel
- Gasworks Tunnel
