= Digswell =

Village in Hertfordshire, England

Coordinates: 51.825°N 0.189°W

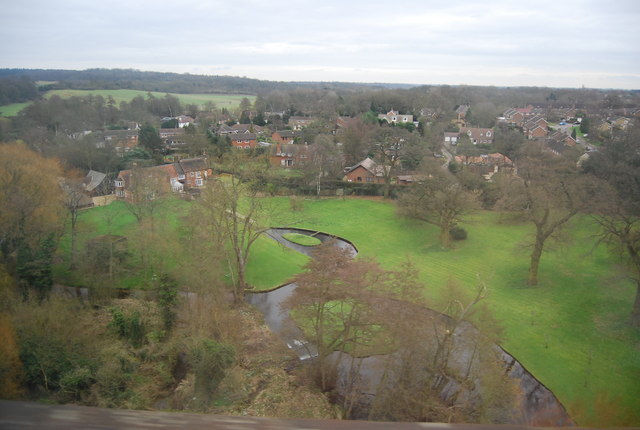

- Location within Hertfordshire
- Population: 1,632 (2011)
- OS grid reference: TL249155
- Civil parish: Welwyn
- District: Welwyn Hatfield
- Shire county: Hertfordshire
- Region: East
- Country: England
- Sovereign state: United Kingdom
- Post town: WELWYN
- Postcode district: AL6
- Dialling code: 01438
- Police: Hertfordshire
- Fire: Hertfordshire
- Ambulance: East of England
- UK Parliament: Welwyn Hatfield

Digswell is a village in the civil parish of Welwyn, in the Welwyn Hatfield district, in the English county of Hertfordshire which is recorded in the 1086 Domesday Book. The population of the urban area of Digswell in the 2011 Census was 1,632.

Digswell's name may be derived from Deacon's Well. There were two manors, with two water mills, much land under plough, and a large area of woodland. From 1835 the parish of Digswell was included in the Welwyn poor law union, and from 1894 the parish was part of the Welwyn Rural District. The 1911 census recorded the parish of Digswell as covering 1,674 acres (677 hectares) and having a population of 401. The small village of Digswell comprised the parish church of St John the Evangelist (13th century, much altered), the 19th century Digswell House (built on the site of a much earlier residence) and a few nearby houses. There were other small hamlets in the parish, notably at Digswell Water on the River Mimram. The parish of Digswell also included Welwyn railway station which opened in 1850 on the Great Northern Railway to serve the village of Welwyn, just over a mile to the west of the station. In the early 20th century an area called "High Welwyn" began to develop around the railway station.

On 30 May 1919 part of the estate once belonging to Lord Cowper of Panshanger was bought at auction by a group of pioneers of the Garden city movement including Ebenezer Howard. Adjoining land was purchased later that year, and a company called Welwyn Garden City Limited was formed on 20 April 1920 with the aim of building a new garden city. The land earmarked for the town straddled the parishes of Hatfield, Welwyn, Tewin and Digswell. A new civil parish called Welwyn Garden City was created on 1 October 1921 from parts of these four parishes. Digswell parish ceded 934 acres (378 hectares) to the new parish, representing over half its area, with the transferred territory including the original Digswell village. The remaining Digswell parish was left covering the area broadly north of the Mimram, with the main population centre being the High Welwyn area that was growing up around the station. The station was renamed Welwyn North in 1926, following the opening of a new permanent station for Welwyn Garden City to the south. High Welwyn gradually also became known as Digswell. The civil parish of Digswell was finally abolished in 1935, merging with the neighbouring parish of Welwyn on 1 April 1935. In 1931 the parish had a population of 644.

The Digswell Viaduct, designed by William Cubitt and opened in 1850, carries the Great Northern Railway over the valley of the River Mimram (River Maran) on some 40 brick arches, reaching 100 feet (30 m) above ground level. The residential workshop for sculptors, artists and musicians sponsored by the Digswell Arts Trust, was once located in Digswell House. Part of the southern Parish Boundary Baulk (raised bank) between the ecclesiastical parishes of Digswell and Hatfield may still be seen in Sherrardspark Wood, a local woodland, nature reserve and Site of Special Scientific Interest.(5) Much of Digswell is now part of the borough of Welwyn Hatfield.

The area known as Digswell today is the largely residential area centred on Welwyn North station. It has a population of about 1600, with a shop or two, and a pub called the Cowper Arms. When first developed, this residential area was known as "High Welwyn" before later taking on the name of the old parish on the south side of the nearby Hertford Road.

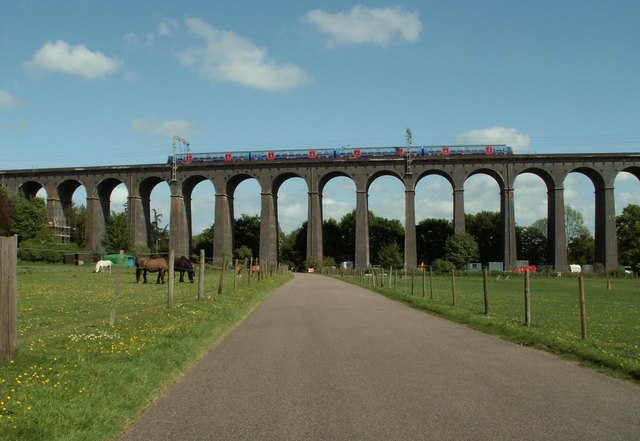
Digswell Viaduct

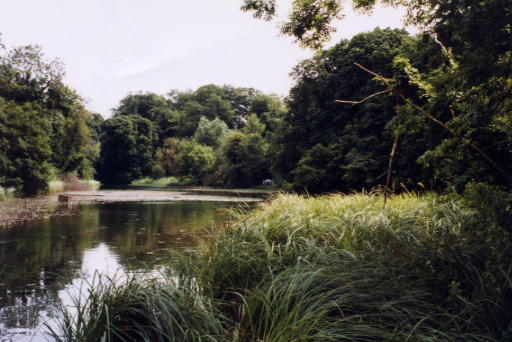
Digswell Lake
