= Welwyn North railway station =

Railway station in Hertfordshire, England

Coordinates: 51.824°N 0.192°W

Welwyn North
- A view of the station from the footbridge, looking north towards the Welwyn South Tunnel

General information
- Location: Digswell, Welwyn Hatfield; England
- Grid reference: TL247154
- Manager: Great Northern
- Platforms: 2

Other information
- Station code: WLW
- Classification: DfT category E

Key dates
- 1850: Station opened by GNR as "Welwyn Station"
- 1926: Station renamed "Welwyn North"

Passengers
- 2020–21: ▼89,414
- 2021–22: ▲0.275 million
- 2022–23: ▲0.367 million
- 2023–24: ▲0.368 million
- 2024–25: ▲0.387 million
Location
Notes
- Passenger statistics from the Office of Rail and Road

Welwyn North railway station serves the villages of Digswell and Welwyn in Hertfordshire, England. The station is located 22 miles (35 km) north of London King's Cross, on the East Coast Main Line. Train services are currently provided by Great Northern.

== Location and design ==
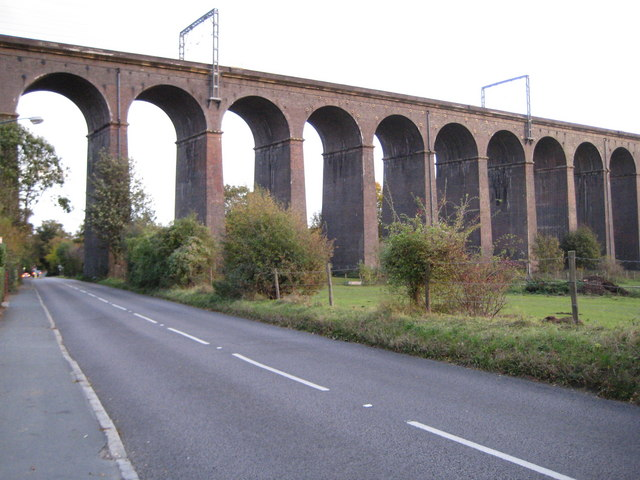
Digswell Viaduct

The station is located in the village of Digswell, but was originally named 'Welwyn' after the village approximately 1 mile (1.6 km) to the west after its prominent coaching inn on the Great North Road, whose route the East Coast Main Line (ECML) largely follows. The station sits immediately to the north of the Digswell Viaduct, whose two tracks are a major bottleneck on the ECML. The station exacerbates this problem because the line is blocked while trains are stopped; there are also two tunnels to the north which only carry two tracks. Various ideas to overcome the limitations of the viaduct and station in keeping with their character and design are periodically discussed.

The station is a rare example of early-GNR architecture; its bricks, from the same on-site brickworks as the Digswell Viaduct, are not used elsewhere. The footbridge was built at an unknown date after the station opened. The station building, footbridge and the tunnel portal to the north are all Grade II listed, while Welwyn Viaduct to the south is Grade II* listed.

On the original line the station had its own signal box, named Welwyn, between Digswell box to the south and Woolmer Green box to the north. The signal box was renamed to Welwyn North before it was closed on 16 September 1973 as part of a scheme to replace semaphore signalling with colour light signalling, which was controlled from King's Cross. At the time of its closure, the box was responsible for the line from Digswell Viaduct to Woolmer Green Junction, and demolished in 1974. The implementation of colour light signalling was finished in April 1977.

== History ==
The station in 1951

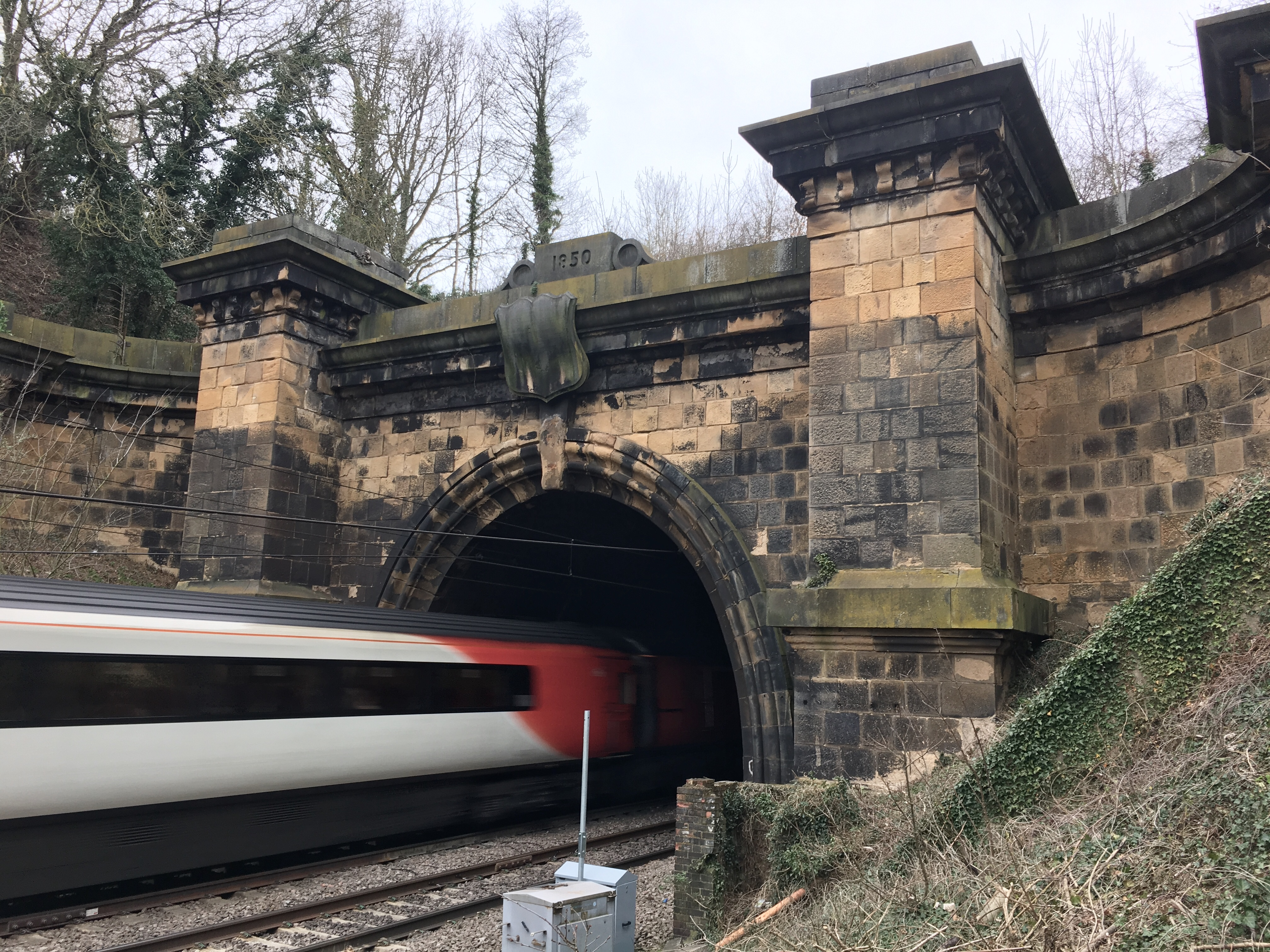
The south portal of Welwyn South Tunnel

Construction of the station and viaduct began in 1848 and the line was opened in 1850 as part of the Great Northern Railway. It was called Welwyn Station until 1926, when it was renamed following the opening of a new station for Welwyn Garden City. It was built by contractor Thomas Brassey out of red brick produced locally from the Welwyn Brick Fields at Ayot Green.

In its heyday the station served local agriculture as well as passenger traffic. There was a goods yard and goods shed on the west side and sidings to the north and south. These included an impressive set of coal drops and, from 1884, a private siding for the adjacent beehive works (E. H. Taylor Ltd. from 1900). The complex included three railway worker's cottages on the west (down) side and two on the east (up). Much of the land to build the station was purchased from local landowner George Augustus 6th Earl Cowper, who built the Railway Inn (later renamed the Cowper Arms Hotel) on land adjoining to the west. This is contemporary with the station and built in the same red brick, reputedly by the same navvies (who went on to frequent it).

In 1926, the station was renamed Welwyn North to coincide with the opening of the new station in Welwyn Garden City. The design of the station remained the same from its opening until the late 1960s when the goods sidings and coal drops were disconnected from the line. This coincided with the end of goods, parcels, and livestock facilities at the station. By 1986 the disused coal drops were the only ones intact on the GNR's section of the ECML. In 1984 the car park was extended onto what was the wagon yard, turntable, and food store for the horses that worked in the yard. In April 1986, a parish meeting for Welwyn (which also includes Digswell and other villages) voted to keep the Welwyn North name, rather than changing to Digswell, with 60% against the change.

== Services ==
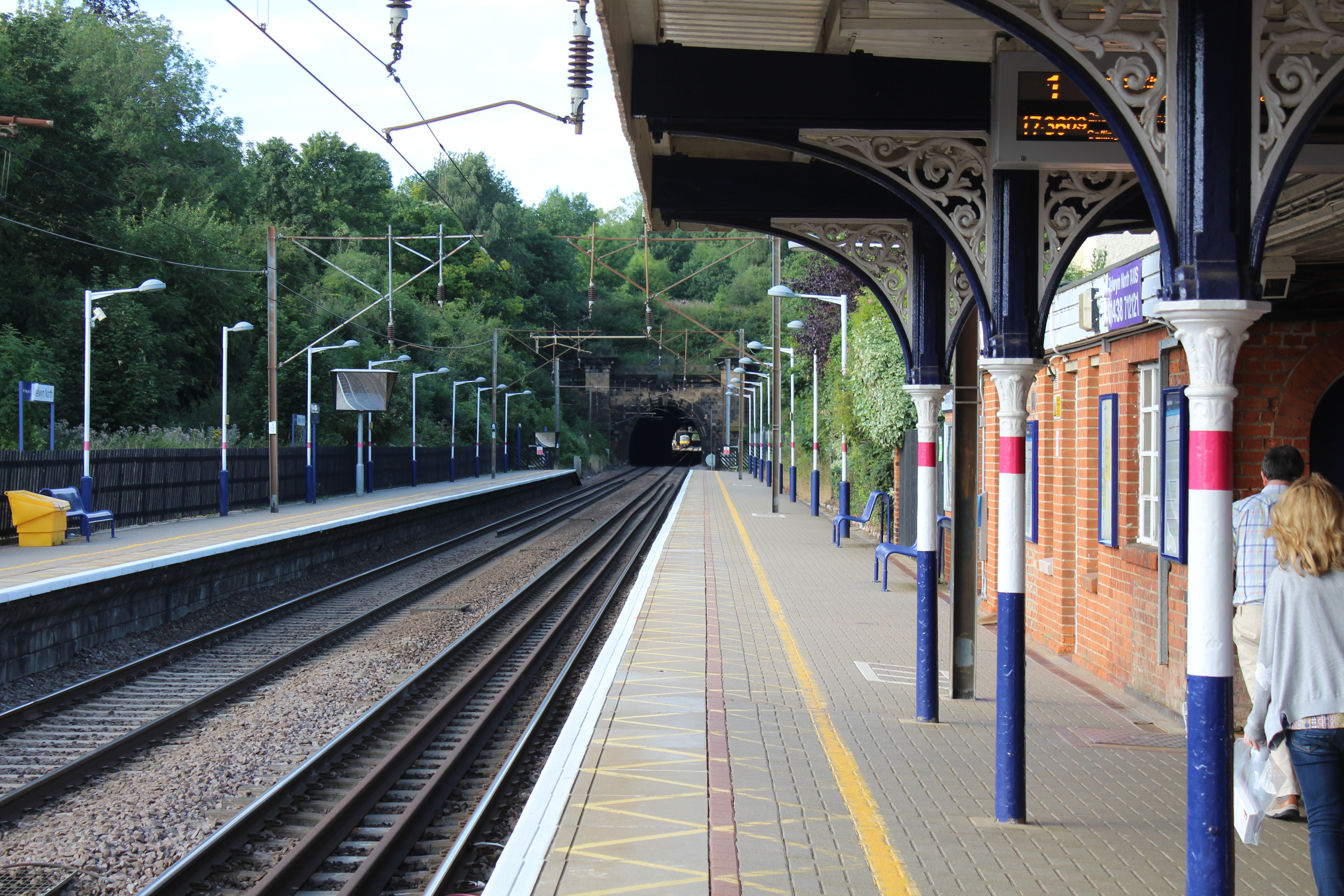
Platform 1 in 2015

All services at Welwyn North are operated by Great Northern. The typical off-peak service in trains per hour is:

- 2 tph to London King's Cross
- 2 tph to Letchworth Garden City, of which 1 continues to Cambridge

During peak times, the Letchworth Garden City service is extended to Cambridge. A small number of fast services operate that only call at London King's Cross, Welwyn North, Knebworth, Hitchin, and Letchworth Garden City. These were introduced after a long campaign by residents of Welwyn and Hitchin.

Preceding station	National Rail	Following station
Welwyn Garden City	Great Northern Great Northern route	Knebworth
