= Digswell Viaduct =

Railway viaduct in the East of England

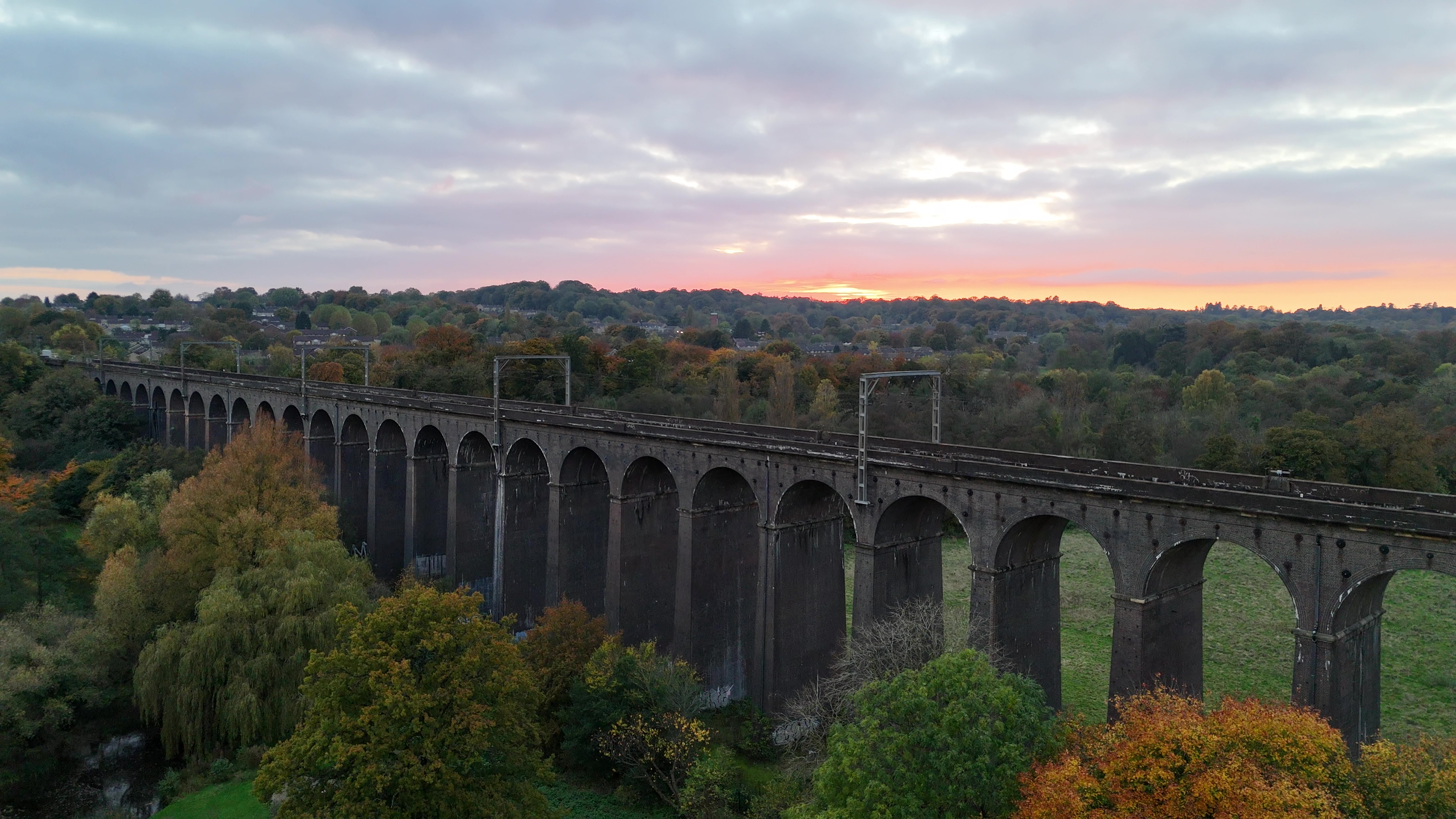
- The viaduct as viewed by drone
- Coordinates: 51°49′07″N 0°11′41″W
- Carries: East Coast Main Line
- Crosses: River Mimram
- Official name: Welwyn Railway Viaduct
- Other name: Welwyn Viaduct
- Heritage status: Grade II* listed

Characteristics
- Total length: 1,450 feet (440 m) (Note: To the nearest 10 feet (3.0 m); see § Dimensions)
- Height: 100 feet (30 m)
- No. of spans: 40

Rail characteristics
- No. of tracks: 2
- Electrified: 25kV AC OHLE

History
- Designer: William Cubitt; Joseph Cubitt
- Constructed by: Thomas Brassey
- Opened: 7 August 1850

Location
- Interactive map of Digswell Viaduct

The Digswell Viaduct, also known as the Welwyn Viaduct and officially the Welwyn Railway Viaduct, is a railway viaduct that carries two tracks of the East Coast Main Line over the Mimram Valley in Hertfordshire in the East of England. A prominent local landmark, it is located between Welwyn Garden City and Welwyn North railway stations, and is located above the village of Digswell and the River Mimram. Designed by father and son William and Joseph Cubitt, and engineered by Thomas Brassey, the viaduct opened in 1850 and has been a Grade II* listed structure since 1980.

The viaduct has forty arches and was originally built from red facing bricks, with blue facing bricks added in the 1930s. Metal gantries were appended to the side of the viaduct in 1980 as part of the electrification of the Great Northern route. At approximately 1,560 feet (475 m) in length, and around 100 ft (30 m) in height, it was one of the largest works on the Great Northern Railway when it opened.

== Design ==
The viaduct carries two tracks of the East Coast Main Line across the River Mimram and its valley. The viaduct was styled to be similar to Roman aqueducts, and was one of the largest works on the GNR when it was built. It has forty arches, and is built from thirteen million red bricks, which were fired using clay that had been mined during the construction of the viaduct. The records of Earl Cowper, who owned the land, gave the precise number of bricks produced on the site as 13,975,638, but some of these would have been used to build Welwyn North station and line the Welwyn Tunnels. Each pier was built with 65 piles driven into the ground by means of a steam-fuelled piling engine. The viaduct is the first perfectly level section of the ECML out of King's Cross.

The waterproofing originally consisted of a bitumen membrane, which the brickwork was covered with so that the water would drain into cast iron pipes at the centre of each pier. The drainage system had become clogged over time but this could not be fixed as the pipes were inaccessibly positioned inside the viaduct. Furthermore, the membrane's efficacy had deteriorated to a point that water was leaking through and running down inside the brickwork. These systems were replaced in 1986. Due to the nature of the ground in the Mimram Valley, eleven of the forty piers were reinforced with timber, for which 19,844 cubic feet (561.9 m^{3}) was needed. The viaduct joins embankments at both ends, which used approximately one million tons of earth to build; this was all moved by manpower and horsepower.

The viaduct has become a prominent part of local history in Welwyn and has been Grade II* listed since 4 November 1980, meaning that it is a "particularly important [structure] of more than special interest". Historic England's list description for the viaduct describes it as "An impressively monumental and elegant railway viaduct of 40 arches for the Great Northern Railway by eminent engineers Sir William and Joseph Cubitt". According to an official document by East Herts District Council It has sometimes been referred to by locals as one of the "seven wonders of Hertfordshire".

=== Dimensions ===
The height and length of the viaduct are not recorded consistently. The National Heritage List for England (NHLE) entry for the viaduct, citing The Railway Heritage of Britain, gives its length as 519 yards (475 m), which is the same as the figure in Welwyn & Welwyn Garden City in 50 Buildings. The original plans suggested the viaduct would be 521 yards (476 m), and British Railways' concurred with this length when asked by the authors of Welwyn's Railways, who, having seen various figures, settled on "about 520 yards (480 m)", which is the figure in Eastern and Central England volume of Civil Engineering Heritage, in Wrottesley's The Great Northern Railway, and in an official document published by East Herts District Council. Charles H. Grinling's The History of the Great Northern Railway, 1845–1922 suggests the completely different length of 497 yards (454 m). This figure and 520 yards are suggested in Rook's River Mimram. There is no disagreement between sources in the length of a span at 30 ft (9 m).

The height of the viaduct increased as a result of electrification. The pre-electrification figure given in Wrottesley's The Great Northern Railway is a maximum of 89 feet (27 m) above the ground. Welwyn's Railways and Civil Engineering Heritage suggest that since electrification its maximum height is 98 feet (30 m), whereas its NHLE entry and Welwyn & Welwyn Garden City in 50 Buildings give the figure as 100 feet (30 m). An official document published by East Herts District Council refers to the height as "nearly 100 feet (30 m)". Rook's River Mimram quotes "almost 100 feet (30 m)" but also 110 feet (34 m) as possible heights.

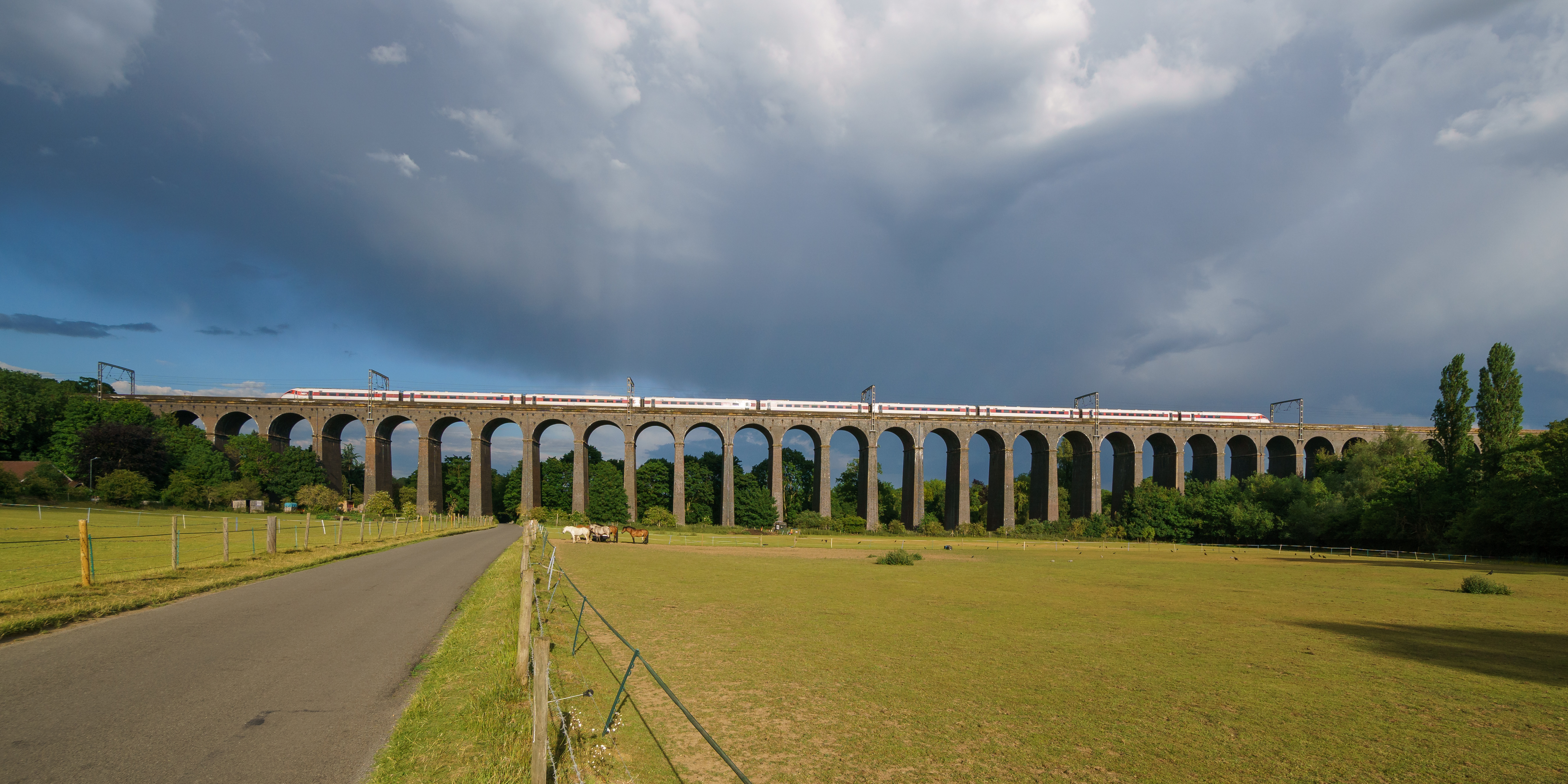
The viaduct as viewed from Digswell Park Road in 2020

== History ==
=== 1848–1850: Construction and opening ===
The viaduct, as illustrated in The Illustrated London News, 10 August 1850

The viaduct was built for the Great Northern Railway (GNR) between 1848 and 1850, in order to carry their line between King's Cross and Welwyn (now Welwyn North), although they planned for this to extend to York. The contract had begun in 1846, and bricks were made from 1847. It is the largest viaduct on the GNR's main line. The viaduct was designed by railway engineers William Cubitt, the GNR's chief engineer, and his son Joseph Cubitt. Some sources attribute it to Lewis Cubitt, who was of no close relation to William and Joseph.

The railway engineer George Hudson opposed the viaduct's construction, saying that it would collapse into the valley due to the nature of the ground, but also because he wanted to protect his monopoly on the Midlands' railways. In order to support the viaduct, a 2,200,000-cubic-yard (1,700,000 m^{3}) trench was excavated and then packed with clay and mortar. Due to the inconsistent ground in the valley, eleven of the piers also had to have timber added to their structure. The construction of the viaduct came at a cost of £69,397, which was equivalent to £8,077,000 in 2025. This was a cost per mile of 133.20, ten times more expensive than the rest of the line. The project was carried out by Thomas Brassey, who stayed in the Cowpers Arms while his workmen lived in temporary huts in Digswell. The workers had recently returned from a project in France, and their behaviour led to complaints from locals, who began to call them the 'tray bong' (Note: I.e. an eye dialect transcription of très bon) gang because of their use of French phrases.

The viaduct was opened along with the rest of the line between London and Peterborough on 7 August 1850. The inaugural trip left at 9:00, and involved 400 people travelling from Maiden Lane to Peterborough to view the newly-built line. The train stopped at Welwyn to allow people to disembark and view the viaduct. However, there exists an urban legend that Queen Victoria opened the viaduct a day earlier on 6 August. The legend says that when her train reached the viaduct, she refused to travel on the train across it because she was scared of its height above the valley. Instead, she was purported to have left the train to cross the viaduct without her and wait at Welwyn, while she travelled across the valley on the ground by horse-drawn cart. While Queen Victoria was not in fact present at the opening of the viaduct, she did use it in 1851 when travelling to Balmoral. On this journey, which was in receipt of significant press coverage at the time, she crossed the viaduct without issue and no sources suggest that she objected to doing so.

=== 1851–present: Operation and refurbishment ===
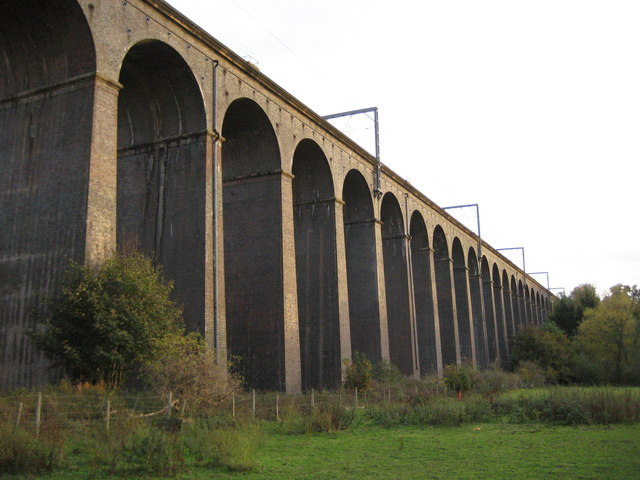
The viaduct in 2009, showing a closer view of the added electrification gantries.

In 1858, the tie rods were strengthened to further support the viaduct, because cracks in the brickwork had been noted. At the time, laden goods trains had also been crossing at 40 miles per hour (64 km/h), so a restriction of 15 mph (24 km/h) was implemented. In his 1889 book The Railways of England, William Mitchell Acworth reports that the Great Northern Railway traditionally considered the viaduct to be more important than the roof of Kings Cross, and yet somehow "not perfectly safe". According to Acworth, the company's engineers used to get regular letters and telegrams from worried passengers about its safety; however, engineers never found any issues with the structure.

On 7 October 1864, a Midland Railway train collided with a freight train belonging to the Great Northern Railway on the viaduct, which was being shunted at the time. The points were set incorrectly such that the train was shunted onto the main line rather than the sidings, where the collision then occurred. The Great Northern Railway immediately took responsibility for the accident, however a court case, Drakeford vs. the Great Northern, arose as to the damages owed to the Midland Railway. A jury eventually settled these damages at £500, which is equivalent to £55,000 in 2025.

By the 1930s, a layer of salt had begun to appear on the red facing bricks on the viaduct, and they were considered too weak to prevent against further weathering. To solve this problem, an extra layer of 9.1-inch (230 mm) blue facing bricks were also added to the viaduct in a project that was completed in October 1935. Overall, 1.18 million bricks were required to complete the project, at a cost of £25,000, equivalent to £1,500,000 in 2025. Tie bars were then added to reinforce both layers of bricks in 1965. As part of the electrification of the Great Northern route by British Rail in the 1970s, overhead lines were added to the viaduct with metal gantries suspended on both sides in Autumn 1974. Extra drainage and waterproofing work was completed on the viaduct in 1986. This work had started in 1984, but were delayed by theft. A waterproof trackbed cover was also added during the same works.

== Capacity issues ==
The Welwyn bottleneck includes Welwyn North railway station (foreground), the Digswell Viaduct (overhead gantries visible), and ends at Digswell Junction heading south (background)

The viaduct only carries two tracks, causing a bottleneck as the railway narrows from four tracks, which is the limiting factor for capacity on the congested and strategically important route. This problem is exacerbated by Welwyn North railway station being situated at the northern end of the viaduct, which blocks the line while trains are stationary, and by two tunnels to the north. Various ideas to overcome the limitations of the viaduct and station without damaging the viaduct's essential historic character and rhythmic design are periodically discussed.

Capacity issues have been raised since as early as the 1890s, when the Hertford Loop line was extended to Stevenage in order to prevent having to widen the viaduct from two tracks to four. The project was completed in 1898, and the Hertford Loop line is still used as a diversionary route for trains today when there is disruption on the East Coast Main Line. The cost of extending the Hertford Loop line was £1.25 million (equivalent to £144,000,000 in 2025), which was considered more expensive than quadrupling the bottlenecks at Potters Bar and Welwyn but came with the benefit of increased passenger usage from the newly served stations. The Department for Transport's 2006 study on railway capacity raised the issue again. A new station opened in the new town of Welwyn Garden City in September 1926, replacing the halt that had been built shortly after the town was incorporated in 1920. To coincide with this, Welwyn railway station was renamed to Welwyn North. This arrangement is still the case today.

In August 2013, BBC News listed the idea of widening the viaduct and the adjacent Welwyn Tunnels to four tracks as one of the top five infrastructure projects that could improve life for people in the United Kingdom. It estimated the cost of such a project at £440 million and considered its likelihood to be "probable, at some point". As of 2015 Network Rail set the maximum capacity of the bottleneck at 18 trains per hour (tph). The East Coast Main Line 2016 Capacity Review considered the quadrupling of the viaduct and Welwyn North railway station, concluding it would not fully resolve the capacity constraints", only increasing capacity for intercity trains by 2–3tph. In June 2020, locals raised concerns at proposals to build developments on land adjacent to the railway that was used to graze animals. Locals requested that Welwyn Hatfield Borough Council restrict development in the area due to its value to the landscape of the Mimram Valley.

== See also ==
- Grade II* listed buildings in Welwyn Hatfield
- List of railway bridges and viaducts in the United Kingdom
