= Knebworth railway station =

Railway station in Hertfordshire, England

Knebworth
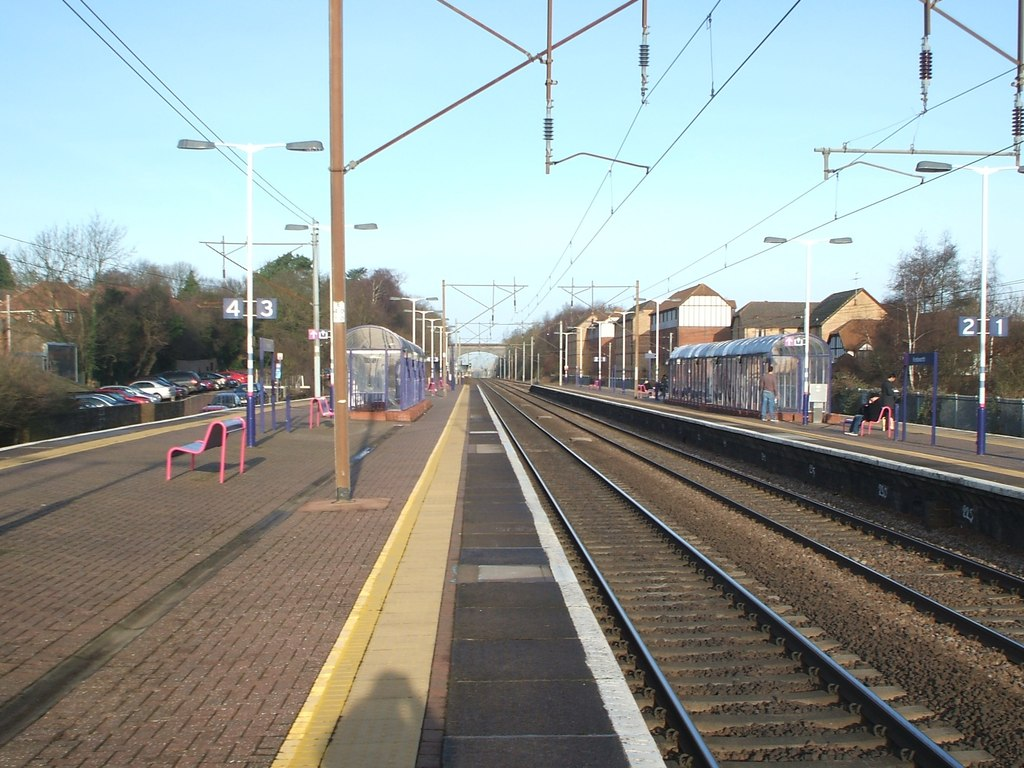
- Knebworth railway station, 2008

General information
- Location: Knebworth, North Hertfordshire; England
- Coordinates: 51.867°N 0.187°W
- Grid reference: TL249202
- Managed by: Great Northern
- Platforms: 4

Other information
- Station code: KBW
- Classification: DfT category E

History
- Original company: Great Northern Railway
- Pre-grouping: Great Northern Railway
- Post-grouping: London & North Eastern Railway

Key dates
- 1 February 1884: Station opened

Passengers
- 2020–21: ▼0.130 million
- 2021–22: ▲0.317 million
- 2022–23: ▲0.404 million
- 2023–24: ▲0.415 million
- 2024–25: ▲0.437 million
Location
Notes
- Passenger statistics from the Office of Rail & Road

Knebworth railway station serves the village of Knebworth in Hertfordshire, England. It is 25 miles 3 chains (25.04 miles, 40.29 km) from London King's Cross on the East Coast Main Line. Train services are currently provided by Great Northern.

== History ==
The main line of the Great Northern Railway was completed in 1852. A station at Knebworth was opened on 1 February 1884. The original timber buildings were replaced by brick and glass structures in 1989.

== Facilities ==
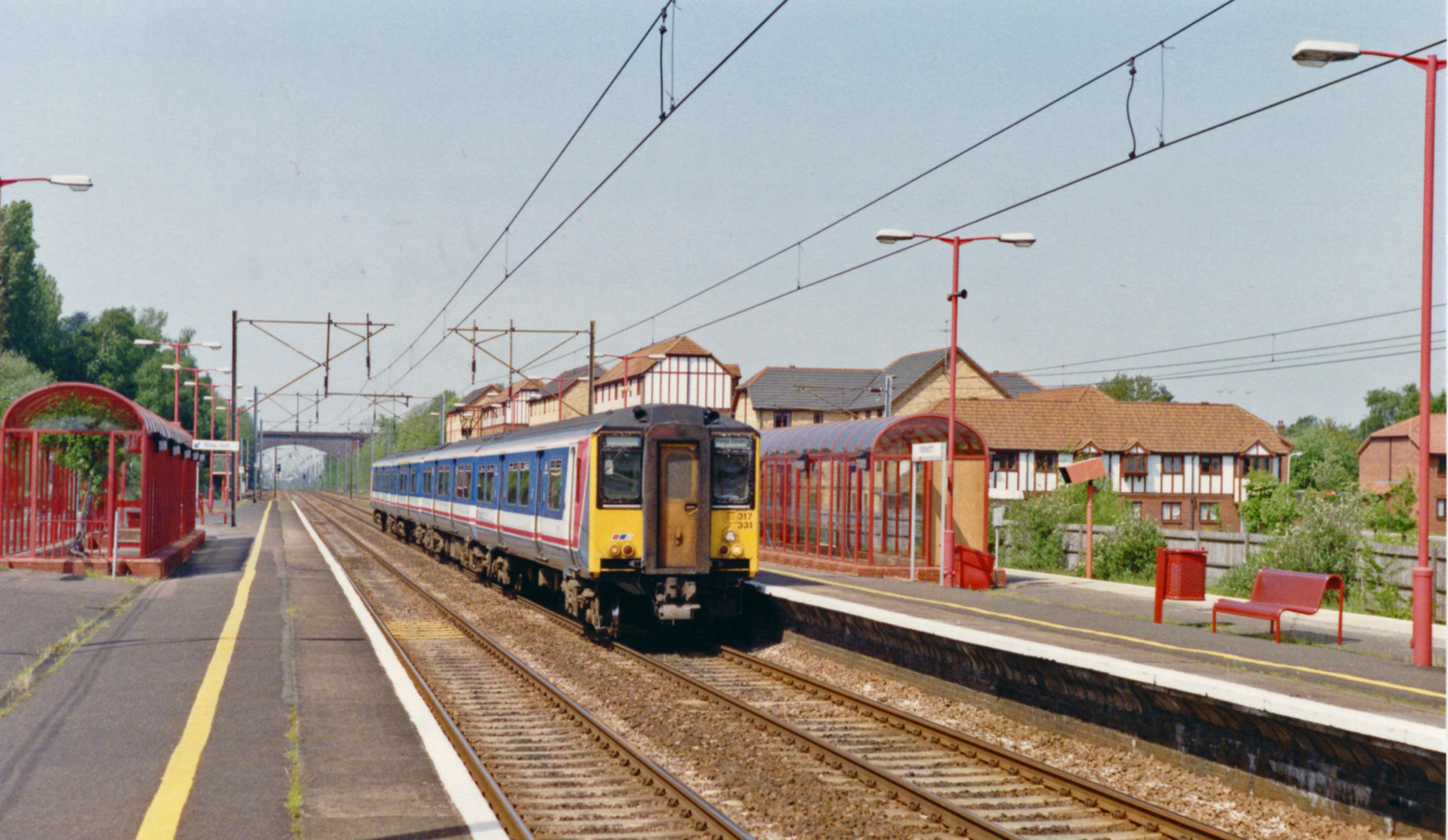
Knebworth station, 1992

In 2009 First Capital Connect installed tactile surfaces to the stations stairways, after it gained funding from the Department for Transport as part of its "Access For All" scheme, although there is no step-free access to any of the four platforms. In 2019, a further £750,000 refurbishment saw the platform shelters replaced.

== Services ==
All services at Knebworth are operated by Great Northern using Class 387 EMUs.

The typical off-peak service in trains per hour is:

- 2 tph to London King's Cross
- 2 tph to Letchworth Garden City of which 1 continues to Cambridge

During the peak hours, most services are extended beyond Letchworth Garden City to Cambridge. There are also a small number of fast services to and from King's Cross that call only at Welwyn North. On Sundays, the station is served by an hourly service between London King's Cross and Cambridge.

Preceding station	National Rail	Following station
Welwyn North	Great Northern Great Northern Route	Stevenage

== Former services ==
Until early 2021, two trains per hour ran direct to London King's Cross during the morning peak period, with a similar non-stopping service in the opposite direction during the evening peak.

Additional non-stopping services to Knebworth from London King's Cross ran hourly throughout the evening on weekdays, with a typical journey time of 19 minutes.

This service provided by Great Northern was withdrawn as a cost-saving measure following the COVID-19 pandemic. The British Rail Class 365 EMUs serving this route were withdrawn from service shortly afterwards.

Additional fast services were included in the proposed May 2022 timetable consultation but were not implemented.

Knebworth residents have established a petition to restore the fast service.
