= Three Counties =

Three Counties may refer to:

== England ==
- Three Counties (Gloucestershire, Herefordshire and Worcestershire) The three English agrarian counties of Gloucestershire, Herefordshire and Worcestershire are often grouped as the three counties.
- Three Counties (Hertfordshire, Bedfordshire and Buckinghamshire) The three English home counties of Hertfordshire, Bedfordshire and Buckinghamshire are also referred together as the Three Counties by locals
  - BBC Three Counties Radio, serving Bedfordshire, Hertfordshire and Buckinghamshire shares this name as a result.
- Three Counties System, a set of caves spanning Cumbria, Lancashire, and North Yorkshire
- Three Counties Asylum, a former psychiatric hospital serving Bedfordshire, Hertfordshire and Huntingdonshire
  - Three Counties railway station (disused), named after the asylum

== China ==
- The Sanyi, Three Counties, or Nanpanshun, three former counties of Nanhai, Panyu, and Shunde surrounding Guangzhou and Foshan
