= Arlesey Old Moat and Glebe Meadows =

Nature reserve in Bedfordshire, England

Coordinates: 52.0214°N 0.2686°W

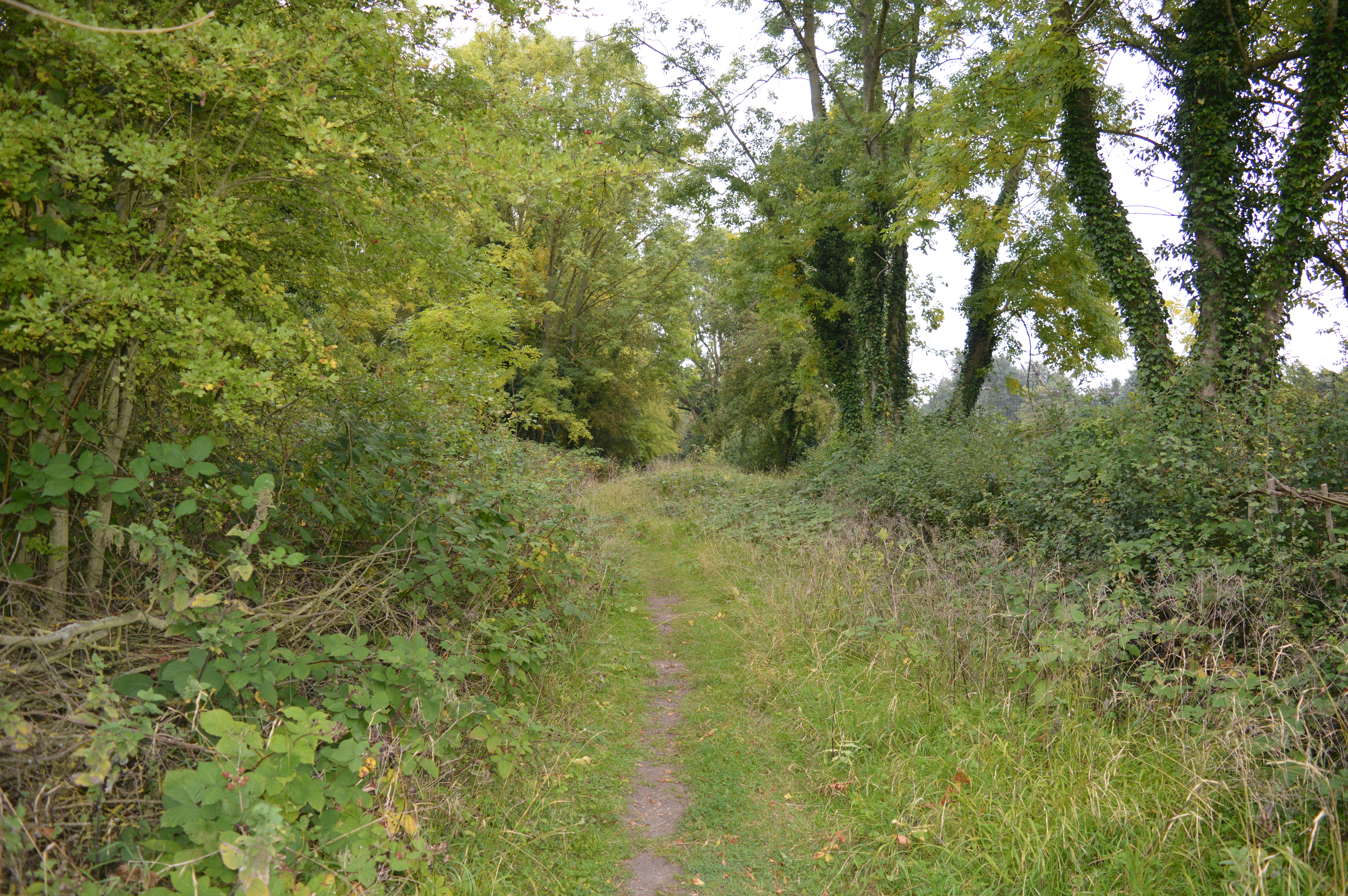
Arlesey Old Moat

Arlesey Old Moat and Glebe Meadows is a 4.3 hectare nature reserve west of Arlesey in Bedfordshire. It is managed by the Wildlife Trust for Bedfordshire, Cambridgeshire and Northamptonshire. The site is a long narrow strip between the River Hiz and the East Coast Main Line, with the entrance to Glebe Meadows immediately west of Arlesey railway station, and Arlesey Old Moat south of the Meadows. The Hicca Way footpath goes through the site.

Frogs, toads and newts spawn in the moat, and dragonflies lay their eggs in it. The meadows have a range of wild flowers, and woodland, which is managed by coppicing, provides a habitat for nesting warblers.

The Glebe Meadows were purchased, by raising funds, by Arlesey Conservation for Nature (ACORN) for the public to enjoy in perpetuity for quiet recreation and for wildlife. The Wildlife Trust agreed to hold the title of the land on their behalf. The Town Council also agreed to financially support the upkeep of the meadows. This project was to commemorate the new Millennium. The day to day upkeep of the reserves is undertaken by ACORN volunteers.
