= Stevenage (disambiguation) =

Stevenage is a town and district in Hertfordshire, England.

Stevenage may also refer to:

- Stevenage (UK Parliament constituency)
- Stevenage F.C., Stevenage's football club
- Stevenage railway station, the station which serves Stevenage
