= Biggleswade railway station =

Railway station in Bedfordshire, England

Coordinates: 52.085°N 0.261°W

Biggleswade
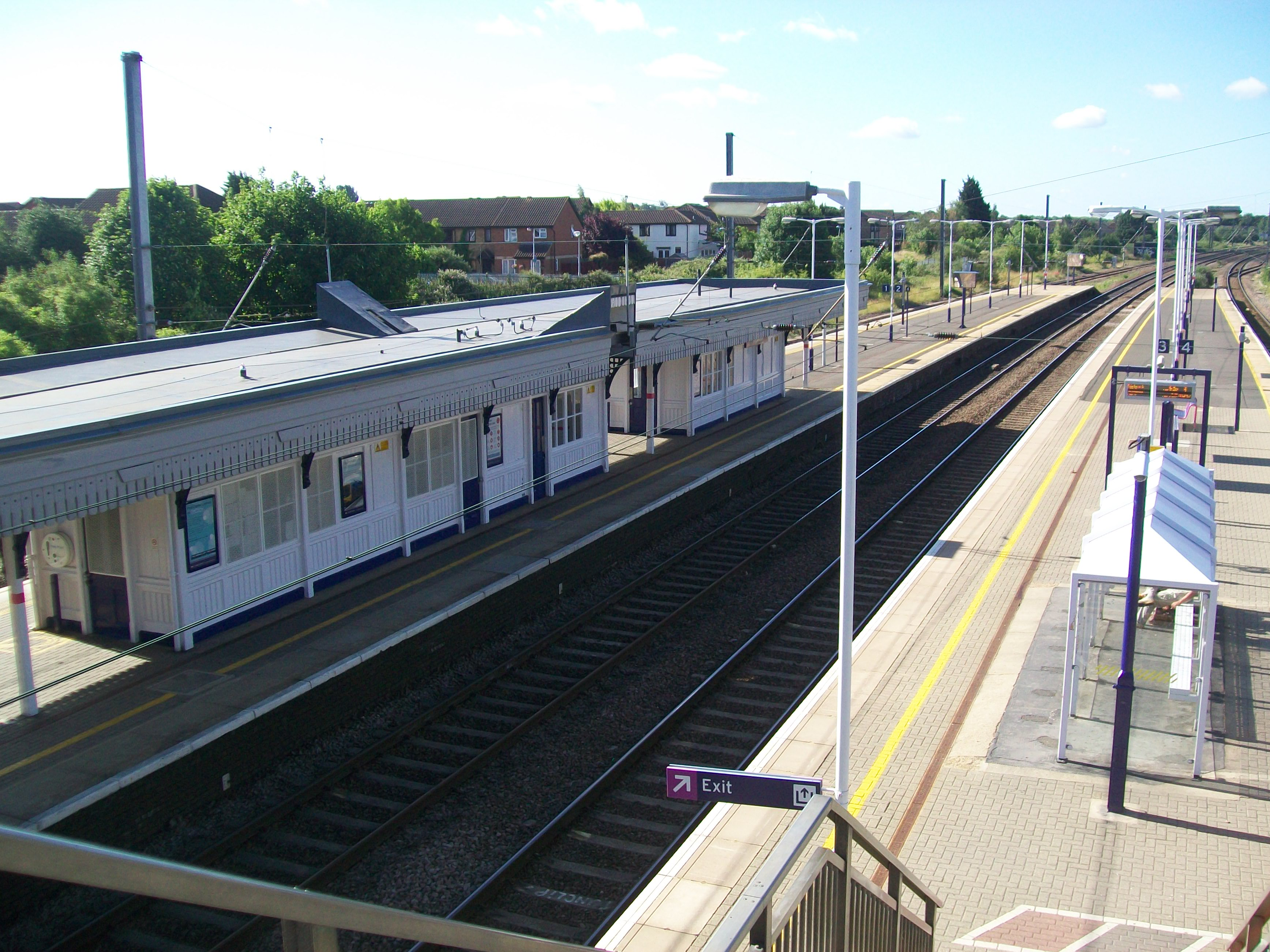
- Biggleswade Station looking South

General information
- Location: Biggleswade, Central Bedfordshire; England
- Grid reference: TL192443
- Managed by: Great Northern
- Platforms: 4

Other information
- Station code: BIW
- Classification: DfT category D

Passengers
- 2020–21: ▼0.228 million
- 2021–22: ▲0.592 million
- 2022–23: ▲0.753 million
- 2023–24: ▲0.789 million
- 2024–25: ▲0.895 million
Location
Notes
- Passenger statistics from the Office of Rail and Road

Biggleswade railway station serves the market town of Biggleswade in Bedfordshire, England. It is on the East Coast Main Line, 41 miles 13 chains (41.16 miles, 66.24 km) from London King's Cross. The station is managed by Great Northern, although most services are operated by Thameslink.

Biggleswade station was originally built in 1850 for the Great Northern railway. The original station consisted of two lines but was rebuilt in 1901 to allow the present four line arrangement to be built.

Biggleswade has two large platforms and four main rail lines, a pair of "up and down" slow lines used by stopping services and a pair of "up and down" fast lines used by fast InterCity East Coast passing through at high speed and Great Northern services at peak times running non-stop to/from London. A fifth line extends off the "down" slow line which links into the remaining sidings used by the Plasmor block company.

The station's platforms have been lengthened so that they can cope with 12 car trains, which are now serving the station. The station currently has four 12-car services in the morning and two in the evening. Larger numbers of 12-car services will serve the station following the completion of the Thameslink Programme.

The large waiting room on platforms 1/2 is listed Grade II on the National Heritage List for England.

== Facilities ==
Following a £60,000 refurbishment in July 2009 by former franchise holder First Capital Connect the station now has two waiting rooms on Platforms 1/2, and also a small cafe at the bottom of the stairs. Platforms 3/4 currently only have a small shelter. The station has another small cafe in the old station buildings, as well as a ticket office.

There are two modern touch screen ticket machines located in front of the booking office, and both sheltered and secure cycle storage is provided next to the station buildings. There are four helpoints located at various points in the station, including one in the main car park.

Biggleswade station does not currently have automatic ticket gates, and is unlikely to do so in the future, as with the current footbridge it is not possible.

== Services ==
Off-peak, all services at Biggleswade are operated by Thameslink using Class 700 EMUs.

The typical off-peak service in trains per hour is:

- 2 tph to Horsham via London Bridge, Redhill and Gatwick Airport
- 2 tph to Peterborough (all stations)

During the peak hours, the station is served by an additional hourly service between London King's Cross and Peterborough. These services run non-stop between Stevenage and London King's Cross and are operated by Great Northern using Class 387 EMUs.

On Sundays, the service is reduced to hourly and southbound services run to London King's Cross instead of Horsham.

Preceding station	National Rail	Following station
Arlesey	Thameslink Great Northern Route	Sandy
Stevenage	Great Northern London to Peterborough Peak Hours Only	St Neots

== History ==
Biggleswade station was once a busy goods yard with several sidings used for loading trains of market produce to be taken to London markets. The decline of this led to a reduction in the use of the station, and it is now used solely for passenger traffic. Plasmor Concrete Products Ltd owns the yard where the former goods depot was sited. These lines into the sidings are still active with train workings of breeze block bricks brought down from Heck to Biggleswade, where they are then unloaded onto lorries for distribution. The goods depot, stables and weighbridge office have all now been demolished but the old goods weighbridge remains on site as well as the remains of a luggage/parcels weighbridge next to the station building, although out of use.

Biggleswade also had a signal box but this was closed when semaphore signals were replaced in the early 1970s. The station was used as a Red Star parcel office but this was closed in the mid 1980s when parcel traffic was forced to use Stevenage station. The line through the station was electrified in 1988, as part of the wider ECML electrification scheme. Prior to that (from 1977 to 1988), local services only operated between Hitchin and Huntingdon outside of peak hours. Local trains connected at Hitchin with the suburban services between King's Cross and Royston and through passengers had to change there.

== Gallery ==
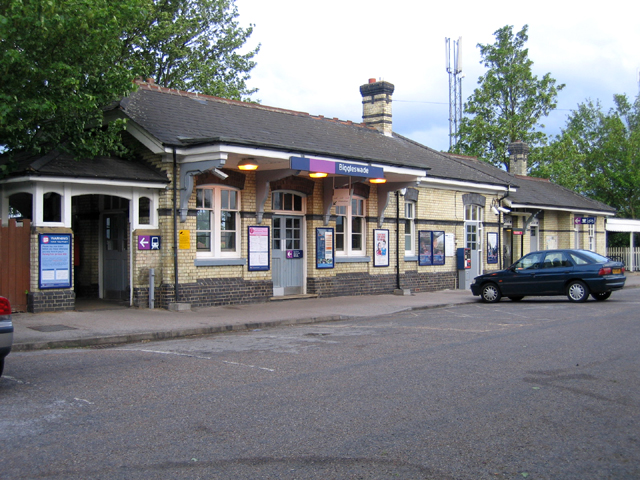
The station entrance in 2006

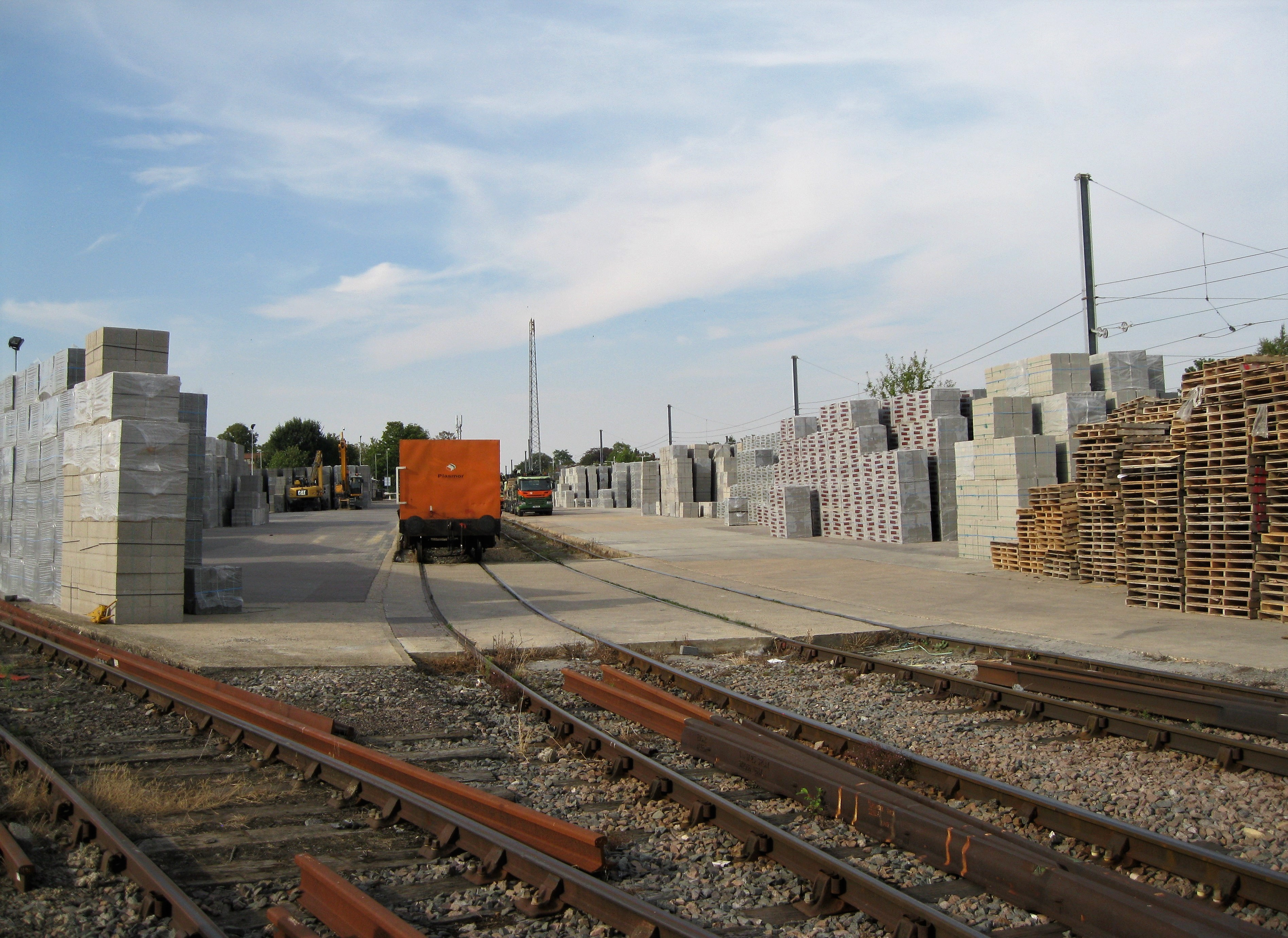
Biggleswade railway sidings: Plasmor blocks
