= Bill Kitchener =

English footballer (born 1946)

Personal information
- Full name: William Harry Kitchener
- Date of birth: 3 November 1946 (age 79)
- Place of birth: Arlesey, England
- Height: 6 ft 1 in (1.85 m)
- Position: Defender

Senior career*
Years	Team	Apps	(Gls)
1963–1967	West Ham United	11	(0)
1966–1967	→ Torquay United (loan)	25	(3)
1967–1971	Torquay United	142	(5)
1971–1972	AFC Bournemouth	36	(2)
- Cambridge City
- Wealdstone
- Christchurch
- New Milton
Total		214	(10)
- * Club domestic league appearances and goals

William Harry Kitchener (born 3 November 1946) is an English former professional footballer who played in the Football League for West Ham United, Torquay United and AFC Bournemouth.

== Career ==
Born in Arlesey, Kitchener began his career as an apprentice with West Ham United after leaving school. He turned professional in November 1963. In September 1966 he joined Torquay United on loan, making his debut on 17 September 1966 in a 5–2 home win against Walsall. He played 25 games before returning to Upton Park. He finally made his Hammers' debut in a First Division away game against Nottingham Forest on 18 March 1967. He won an extended run in the first team, making 11 appearances for West Ham, before leaving in December 1967 to become Torquay's record signing. He immediately established himself in the side, taking Bobby Baxter's place at left-back, though also played in the centre of defence when required. By the end of his second spell with Torquay, he had played a further 142 games, scoring five goals.

In July 1971, he moved to AFC Bournemouth, managed by his former West Ham and Torquay teammate John Bond in July 1971, but stayed only one season with the Cherries before leaving league football, joining Cambridge City. He subsequently played for Wealdstone, Christchurch and New Milton.

Outside of football he had joined the Devon & Cornwall Police Force whilst with Torquay, and was later stationed at Burley in the New Forest for many years.
