= Etonbury Castle =

Castle ruins in Bedfordshire, England

- Bedfordshire

Site information
- Type: Castle
- Condition: Earthworks

Location
- Shown within Bedfordshire
- Coordinates: 52.02672°N 0.26403°W
- Grid reference: grid reference TL183445

Etonbury Castle was a castle in the town of Arlesey, located near the road to Baldock, in the county of Bedfordshire, England (grid reference TL192379).

An ancient timber castle, attributed to the Danes, Etonbury Castle had a ringwork and one or two baileys.

The site was destroyed by a railway built through it. Only cropmarks and some earthworks remain.

== See also ==
- Castles in Great Britain and Ireland
- List of castles in England
