= Stevenage railway station =

Railway station in Hertfordshire, England

Stevenage
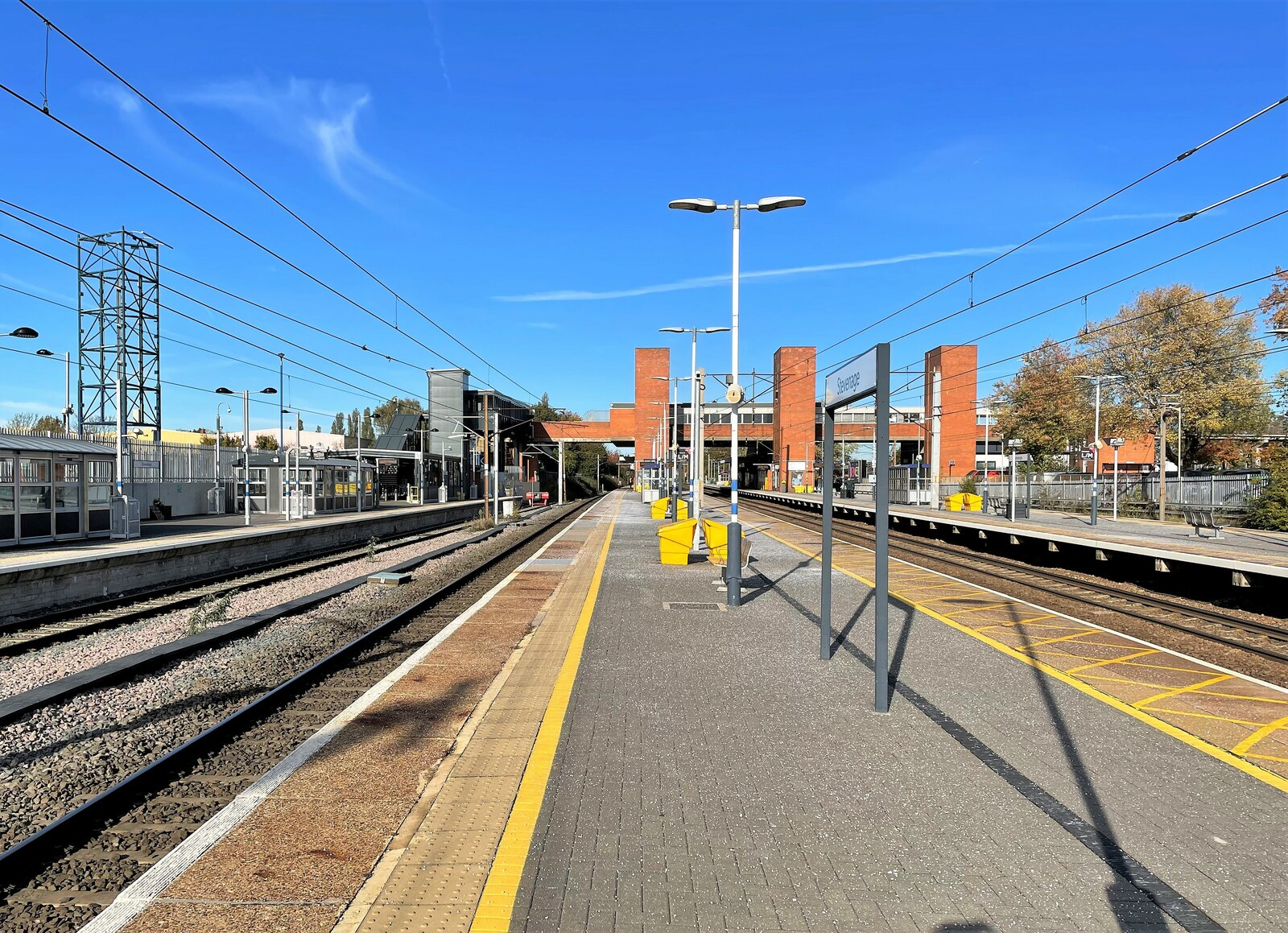
- The station in November 2021 looking north, with the new platform 5 on the far left

General information
- Location: Stevenage, Borough of Stevenage; England
- Coordinates: 51°54′6″N 0°12′25″W
- Grid reference: TL234241
- Owner: Network Rail
- Manager: Great Northern
- Platforms: 5
- Connections: Local Buses Regional Buses Local Taxis

Other information
- Station code: SVG
- Classification: DfT category C1

History
- Opened: 23 July 1973

Key dates
- 8 August 1850: Original station opened by GNR
- 22 July 1973: Station closed
- 23 July 1973: Relocated 73 chains (1.5km) south to present location and opened by BR
- 29 September 1973: Officially opened by Shirley Williams MP

Passengers
- 2020–21: ▼1.228 million
- Interchange: ▼0.238 million
- 2021–22: ▲3.385 million
- Interchange: ▲0.833 million
- 2022–23: ▲4.050 million
- Interchange: ▲1.957 million
- 2023–24: ▲4.272 million
- Interchange: ▼0.983 million
- 2024–25: ▲4.676 million
- Interchange: ▲1.193 million
Location
Notes
- Passenger statistics from the Office of Rail and Road

Stevenage railway station serves the town of Stevenage in Hertfordshire, England. The station is around 27.6 miles (44.4 km) north of London King's Cross on the East Coast Main Line. The station lies just to the north of Langley junction, a grade separated junction where the Hertford Loop Line diverges from the East Coast Main Line; the two lines re-converge at Alexandra Palace in London's northern suburbs.

Stevenage is served and managed by Govia Thameslink Railway, which operates stopping services southbound to King’s Cross, Brighton, Gatwick Airport and Moorgate; northbound services connect to Cambridge and Peterborough. It is also served frequently by London North Eastern Railway, which operates non-stopping services southbound to King's Cross and northbound to York, Leeds and Edinburgh Waverley. Hull Trains and Lumo operate very limited services from the station.

The present station, built by British Rail, was opened for services on 23 July 1973. It was officially opened on 26 September 1973 by Shirley Williams, then MP for Stevenage; (Note: A brass plaque in the upstairs walkway/bridge commemorates this) this replaced the previous station which was sited 73 chains (1,500 m) to the north and further away from the centre of the new town.

== History ==
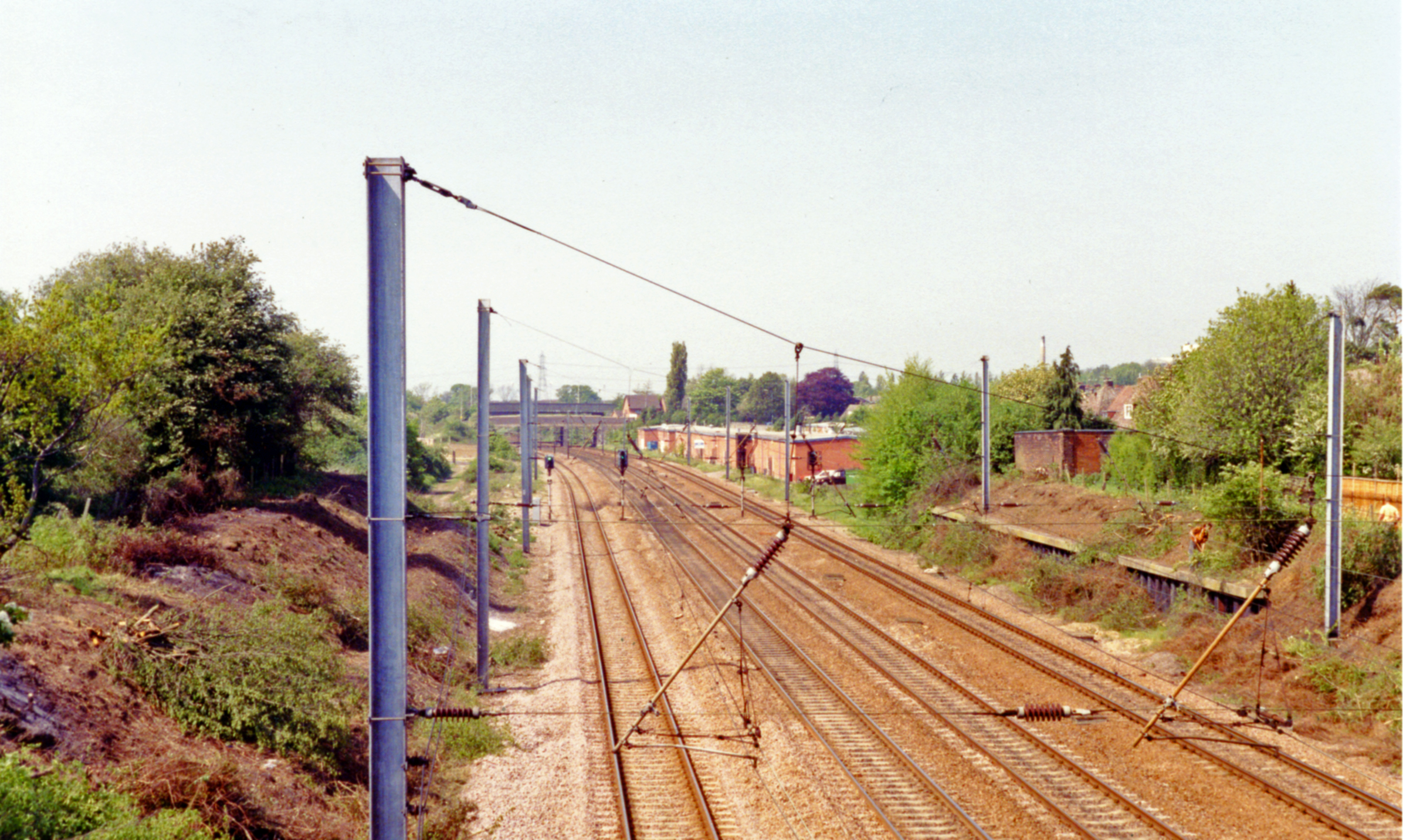
Remains of the old station

The original Stevenage railway station was built in 1850 by the Great Northern Railway, despite the apparent hostility towards the railway being built there at that time due to the inevitable decline it would cause to local coach businesses, which all ended shortly after the station was opened.

In 1946, Stevenage became one of the first New Towns, which resulted in a new town centre. In 1973, the station was relocated 73 chains (1.47 km) south, within walking distance (220 yd, 200 m) of the new town centre. As built, the new station had two island platforms, serving four through tracks.

In December 2013, the previous train operator, First Capital Connect, started refurbishing the station completely, introducing passenger lifts between platform and street level, and refurbishing the concourse area with retail units. The works were due to be completed by April 2014, but were delayed. After Great Northern took over the franchise in September 2014, these works were completed.

Until May 2018, most weekday trains from London on the Hertford Loop Line ran through to Letchworth, as the layout gave insufficient capacity to accommodate terminating trains at Stevenage. However, in 2018, all the loop line services were cut back to start/terminate at Stevenage. To help alleviate the capacity problem, an additional south-facing terminal platform was built, similar to the arrangement at Welwyn Garden City, which allows loop line services to start and terminate there. Platform 5 was officially opened on 3 August 2020.

In 2021, a tactile map was installed, in collaboration with the Royal National Institute of Blind People, to help blind and partially sighted passengers navigate the station.

== Facilities ==
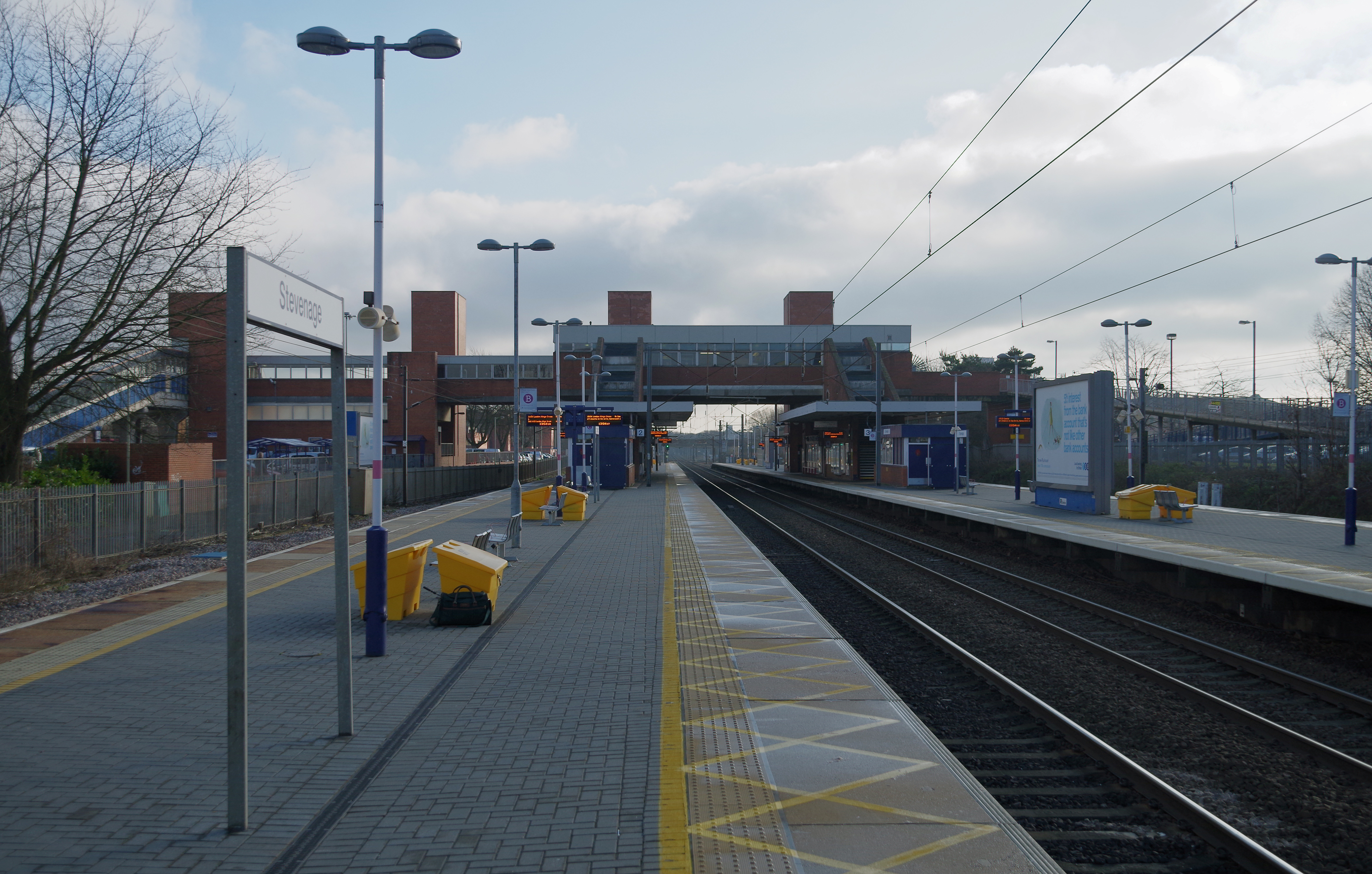
Southbound view of the station from platform 2 in January 2015, before the construction of platform 5

The station has five platform tracks, which are at ground level. The westernmost track (platform 5) is a terminal track for trains to and from London via the Hertford Loop Line, and is served by a side platform. The remaining four through tracks are served by two island platforms. On this stretch of line the tracks are paired by direction, so each island platform serves trains going in one direction, with platform 1&2 serving southbound trains and platform 3&4 serving northbound trains.

The platforms are accessed by stairs and lifts from the station concourse, which spans above the tracks. There are station entrances on both sides of the station, which have stairs, lifts and ramps to the concourse. At concourse level are separate ticket offices for Great Northern and London North Eastern Railway, as well as ticket machines. Toilets are also provided at this level, but not on the platforms. All three platforms have indoor waiting rooms, along with outdoor seating along the length of the platforms. There are coffee bars on each of the two island platforms.

There are two sets of automated ticket barriers. One, on the concourse level, gives access to the two island platforms (platform numbers 1 to 4), whilst the other, at platform level, gives access to platform 5. Interchange between platform 5 and any of the other platforms requires the passenger to pass through both barrier lines. The station is a short walk on a walkway from Stevenage Bus Interchange and is opposite a leisure complex that includes the Gordon Craig Theatre.

== Services ==
Services at Stevenage are provided by four train operating companies:

=== Greater Thameslink Railway ===
Greater Thameslink Railway operates trains here under two sub-brands:

==== Great Northern ====
Great Northern serves Stevenage with a half-hourly service to Moorgate, which calls at all stations via the Hertford Loop Line. These services start and finish at Stevenage using platform 5. These services are operated using Class 717 electric multiple units. It also runs the half-hourly local stopping service between Kings Cross and Letchworth Garden City, of which one continues to Cambridge (all stations). These call at Finsbury Park, Alexandra Palace and Potters Bar, then all stations from Hatfield northwards.

It also operates an hourly fast service during weekday peak hours between London King's Cross and Peterborough. Southbound, this service runs non-stop to London King's Cross and northbound, calls only at Biggleswade, St Neots and Huntingdon. These services are operated using Class 387 electric multiple units.

==== Thameslink ====
Most services at Stevenage are operated by Thameslink, using Class 700 electric multiple units.

The typical off-peak service in trains per hour is:

- 2 tph to Brighton, via London Bridge and Gatwick Airport (semi-fast)
- 2 tph to Horsham via London Bridge, Redhill and Gatwick Airport
- 2 tph to Peterborough (all stations)
- 2 tph to Cambridge (semi-fast)

On Sundays, the services between Brighton and Cambridge are reduced to hourly, with no service to Horsham (an hourly service is run by the company instead between King's Cross and Peterborough)

=== London North Eastern Railway ===
London North Eastern Railway generally serves Stevenage with two trains per hour in each direction during the day, to pick up only northbound and set down only southbound. There is an hourly service between London King's Cross and Leeds, with a train every two hours continuing to Harrogate. There is also an hourly service from King's Cross, alternating northbound between terminating at Lincoln or York, via Retford.

During peak hours, a small number of services to Leeds are extended to and from Bradford Forster Square.

There are also a small number of early morning and late evening services to and from Newcastle and Edinburgh Waverley.

Services are operated using Class 800 bi-mode trains, Class 801 electric multiple units and InterCity 225 electric locomotive-hauled sets.

=== Hull Trains ===
Hull Trains operates a limited service on Sunday afternoons only. The station is served by one northbound service to Hull and two southbound services to London King's Cross. Services are operated using Class 802 bi-mode trains.

=== Lumo ===
Lumo operates two northbound services to Edinburgh Waverley and three southbound services to London King's Cross, to pick up only northbound and set down only southbound. Services are operated using Class 803 electric multiple units.

Preceding station	National Rail	Following station
London King's Cross	London North Eastern Railway East Coast Main Line	Peterborough
London King's Cross	London North Eastern Railway East Coast Main Line	Grantham
London King's Cross	Hull Trains East Coast Main Line; Limited Service	Grantham
London King's Cross	Lumo East Coast Main Line	Newcastle
London King's Cross	Great Northern London to Peterborough Peak Hours Only	Biggleswade
Watton-at-Stone	Great Northern Hertford Loop line	Terminus
Knebworth	Great Northern Great Northern route	Hitchin
Finsbury Park	Thameslink Great Northern route	Hitchin

== See also ==
- Nala, a local cat, was popular with commuters and known to sit on the ticket barriers at the station. She died in December 2025.
