= Blue Lagoon (Bedfordshire) =

Lagoon in Bedfordshire

- The Blue Lagoon
- Interactive map of Blue Lagoon
- Location: Bedfordshire
- Lake type: Lagoon
- Surface elevation: 50 m (160 ft)

Blue Lagoon, also known as Arlesey Ditch, was formerly a chalk and clay pit in Arlesey, that has been filled with water, but the surrounding area is semi-natural grassland. It is west of the River Hiz and has an elevation of 50 metres (160 ft). The site was formerly used to produce cement and it stopped doing so in the 1960s after production was moved to a larger site in the Chilterns.

The lagoon in Arlesey, Bedfordshire

== Geography ==
Blue Lagoon is an old chalk and clay pit at Arlesey which has filled with water, but the surrounding land has semi-natural grassland. Located at a grid reference of TL197343, it covers and area of 8 hectares (20 acres), with and average depth of 1-metre (3 ft 3 in), at an elevation of 50 metres (160 ft), and it is west of the River Hiz. The lagoon holds almost 83,000 cubic metres (2,900,000 cu ft) of water. A cliff in the lagoon had to be demolished due to the people jumping into the lagoon. Although its average depth is 1-metre (3 ft 3 in), it can in some places be as deep as 7.6 metres (25 ft) with a 0.61 metres (2 ft) sludge at the bottom of it.

== History ==
In Arlesey, cement was produced using Chalk Marl in Green and Blue Lagoons. In the 1960s, it was abandoned, with production in larger sites in the Chilterns. In 1977, the old steam shovel was recovered from the Arlesey Pit, which is now the Blue Lagoon, and was subsequently restored and taken to the Museum of Lincolnshire Life. In July 2001, three children drowned in the lake after a man had driven off a 5-metre (16 ft) cliff, causing the car to flip mid air and land on its roof.

== Recreation ==
Recreational activities undertaken at the lagoon include fishing, dinghy cruising, windsurfing and dinghy racing.
