= Stevenage Bus Interchange =

Stevenage Bus Station, operations and history

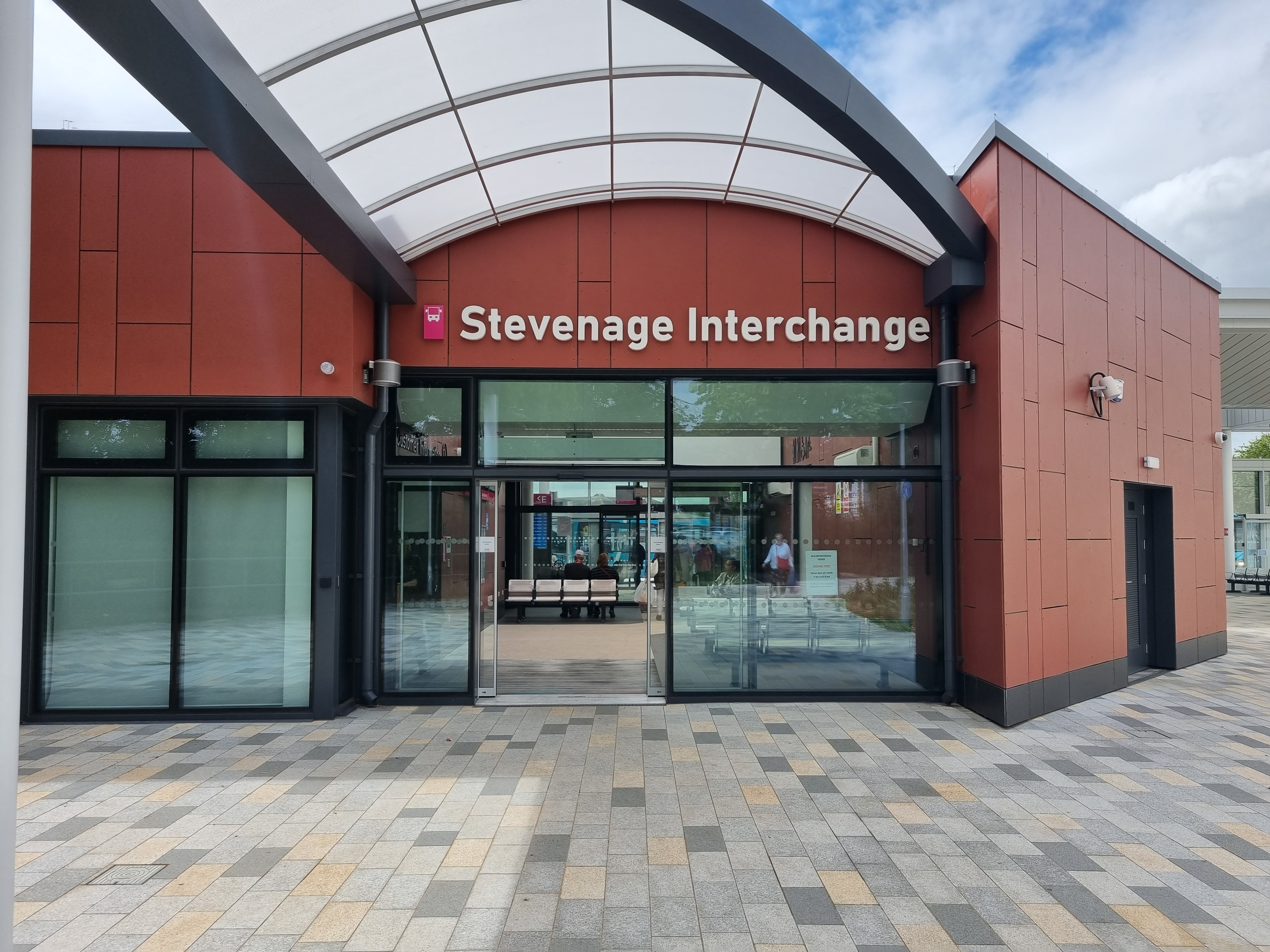

General information
- Location: Lytton Way, SG1 1WX
- Coordinates: 51°54′4.79″N 0°12′16.78″W
- System: Bus Station
- Owner: Stevenage Borough Council
- Bus stands: 10 (Lettered)
- Bus operators: Arriva, Centrebus, Unobus, CentralConnect, Stagecoach, Flixbus
- Connections: National Rail, Taxi

Construction
- Cycle facilities: Yes
- Accessible: Yes
- Architect: Stephen George + Partners

History
- Opened: 26/06/2022 (At current location)
- Rebuilt: 2022 (Relocated)
Location

Stevenage Bus Interchange is a facility that serves the town of Stevenage, Hertfordshire, with local and regional bus services. These include services to Watford, Cheshunt, and Hertford, within Hertfordshire, Luton, Bedfordshire, Cambridge, Cambridgeshire and Victoria Coach Station, London. There are National Rail connections through Stevenage Railway Station on the other side of Lytton Way. Local Taxi services are available, and rank in the Railway station forecourt.

== Facilities ==
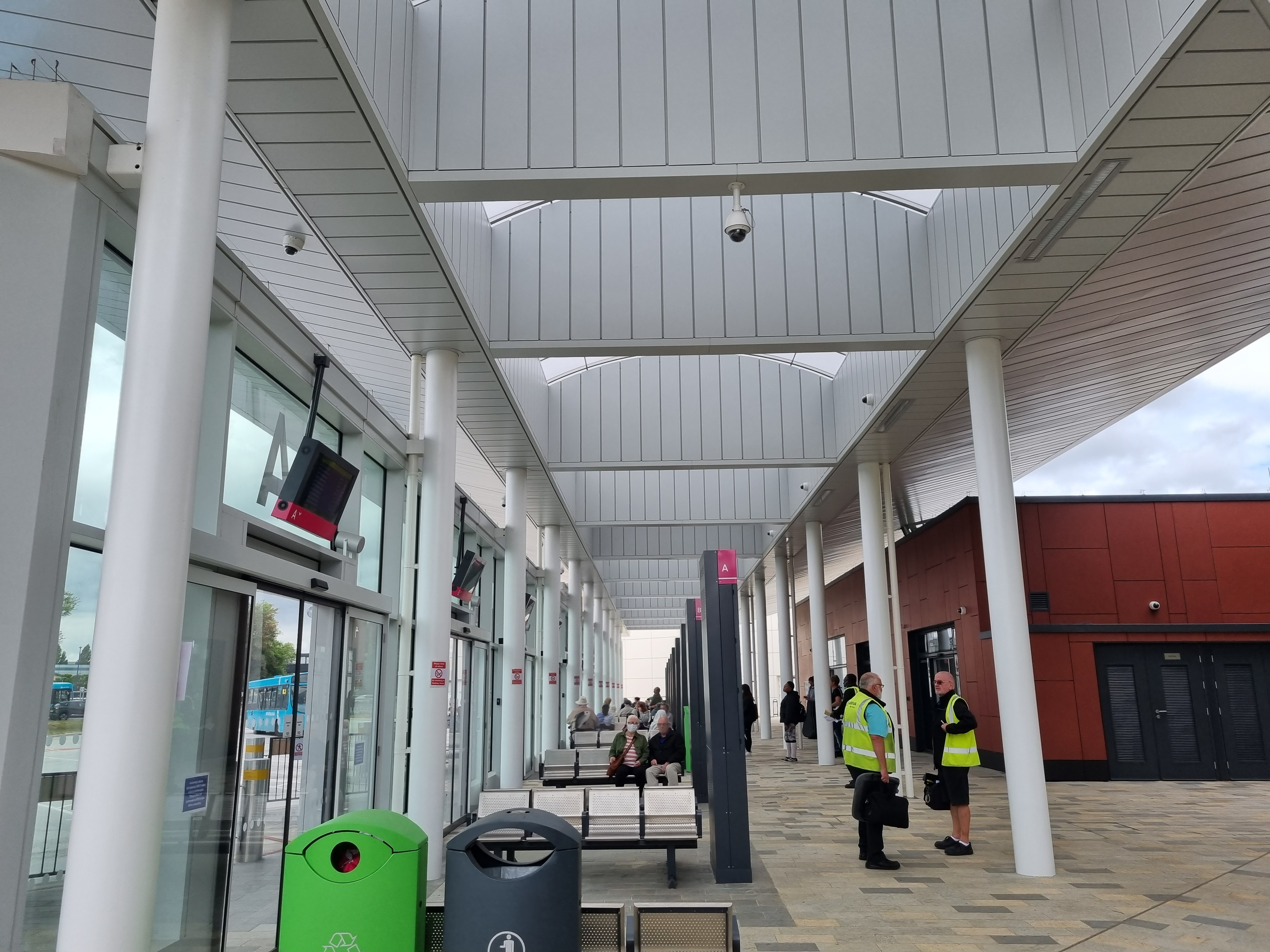
Outdoor concourse

The Interchange offers an outdoor waiting area, and indoor waiting area with free-to-use Public Toilets and a staffed Information Desk. There are 2 rented retail outlets, a takeaway coffee shop and a convenience store. Both are accessible from the outdoor concourse.

Information screens are provided by Intalink, offering departure information for Buses and National Rail.

The Interchange itself is owned by Stevenage Borough Council.

== Services ==
As of April 2024, Arriva is the principal operator, and runs the vast majority of routes within Stevenage. Arriva also operate some services to elsewhere in the county, including St. Albans, Welwyn Garden City, Watford and Rickmansworth. Most Arriva routes within Stevenage are prefixed with 'SB' followed by the route number.

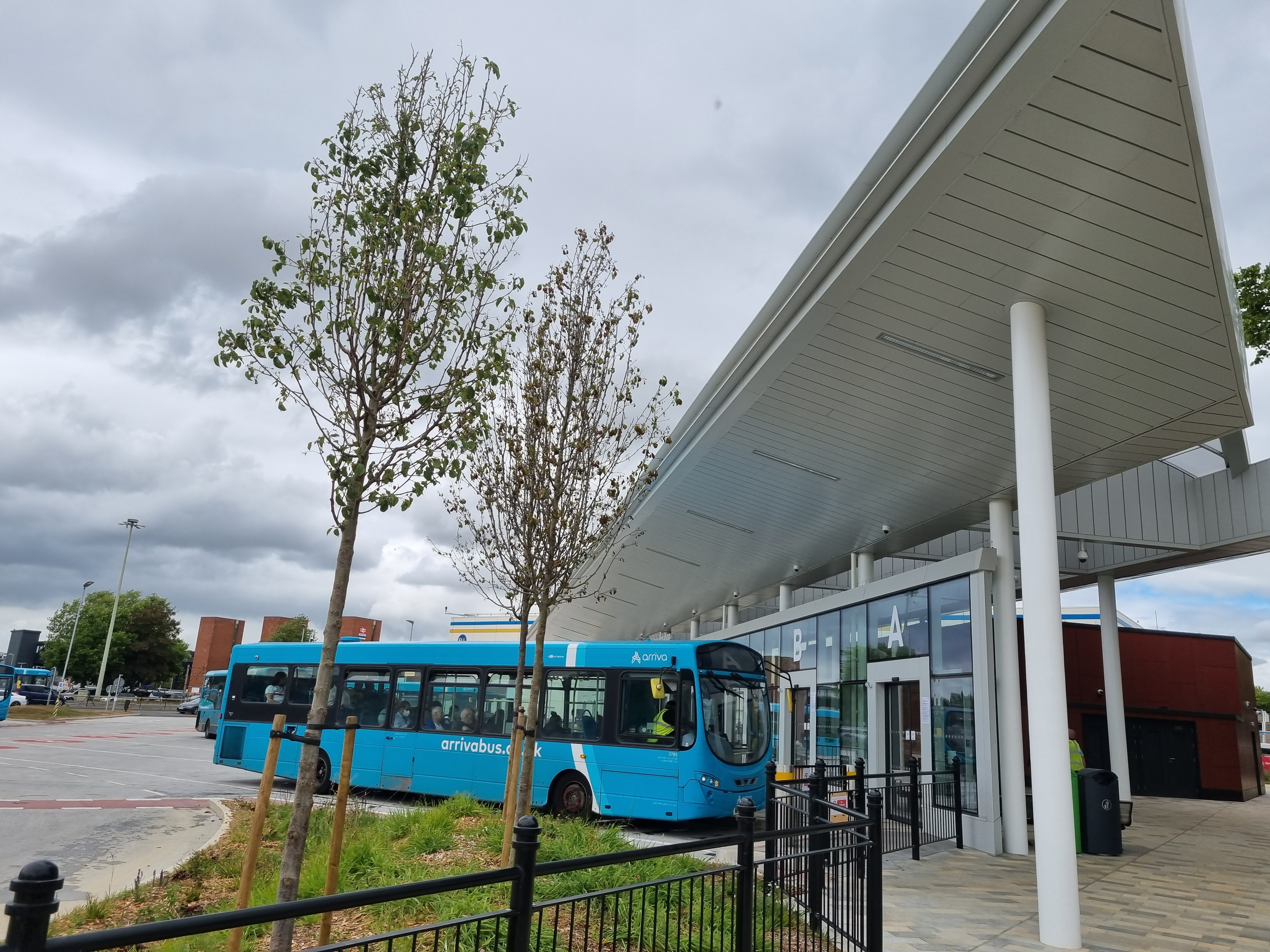
Arriva bus at Stevenage Interchange

Centrebus operates several services within Stevenage and further afield. This includes the 907 and 390 routes, which form a part of Hertfordshire County Council's Bus Service Improvement Plan, funded by £29.7 million from the Department for Transport.

Unobus operates route 635 from Hitchin via Stevenage to Watford, calling at the University of Hertfordshire's Hatfield Campus.

CentralConnect (owned by Vectare since September 2023) operate several services calling at Stevenage Interchange.

FlixBus operate several services a day to Cambridge and Victoria Coach Station.

== History ==
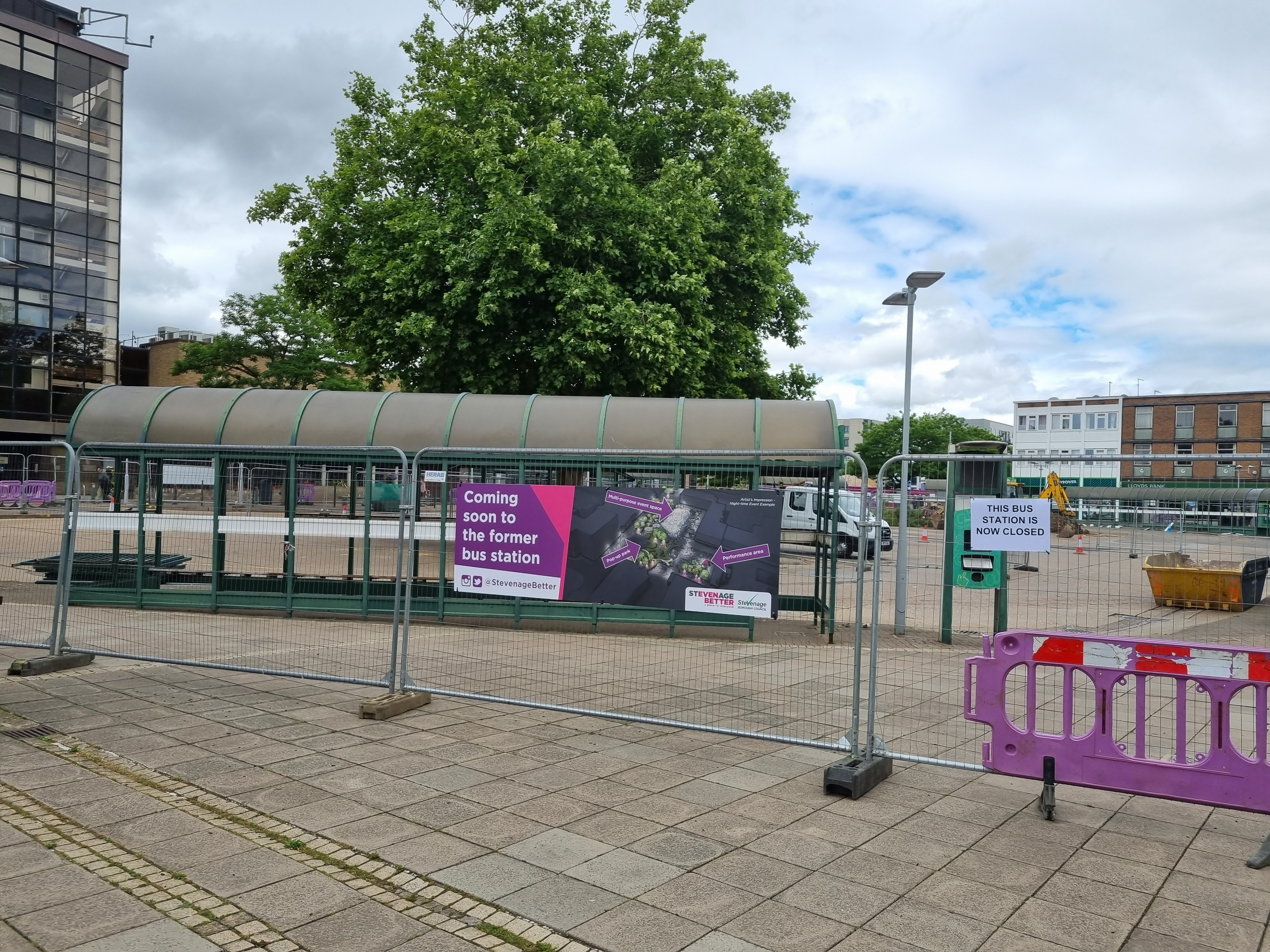
Former bus station, shortly after closure in 2022

The current bus station, named Stevenage Interchange was opened on Sunday 26th June 2022. On opening the previous bus station ceased operations, and is now a multi-purpose outdoor community space. The interchange was designed by Stephen George + Partners LLP. The contract for building the new £8 million bus station was awarded to Willmott Dixon in 2021. The new bus station forms a part of a 20 year regeneration project for the town, involving over £1 billion in funding.

Unlike the previous bus station, the new interchange is located on the edge of the town centre, to the south east of the previous bus station. This facilitates quicker transfer between bus, rail and taxi services. The new bus station interlinks with the planned Station Gateway project, which will see the town centre effectively brought closer to the railway station with new housing and office developments above street-level retail and hospitality.
