= Letchworth Station (painting) =

Painting by Spencer Gore

- Artist: Spencer Gore
- Year: 1912
- Type: Oil on canvas, landscape painting
- Dimensions: 81.9 cm × 94.5 cm (32.2 in × 37.2 in)
- Location: National Railway Museum, York

Letchworth Station is a 1912 landscape painting by the British artist Spencer Gore. It features a view of Letchworth Garden City railway station in Hertfordshire. The station had been built a few years earlier to serve the new garden city of Letchworth.

Gore was a member of the Camden Town Group who painted a number of views of Letchworth. He produced this while staying with his friend Harold Gilman during the summer of 1912 and displayed it at the Second Post-Impressionist Exhibition at the Grafton Galleries in London that October. Today it is part of the collection of the National Railway Museum in York, having been acquired with the assistance of the Art Fund in 1984.

== Bibliography ==
- Trumble, Angus. Bohemian London: Camden Town and Bloomsbury Paintings in Adelaide. Art Gallery of South Australia, 1997.
