= Arlesey =

Town in Bedfordshire, England

Coordinates: 52.0070°N 0.2654°W

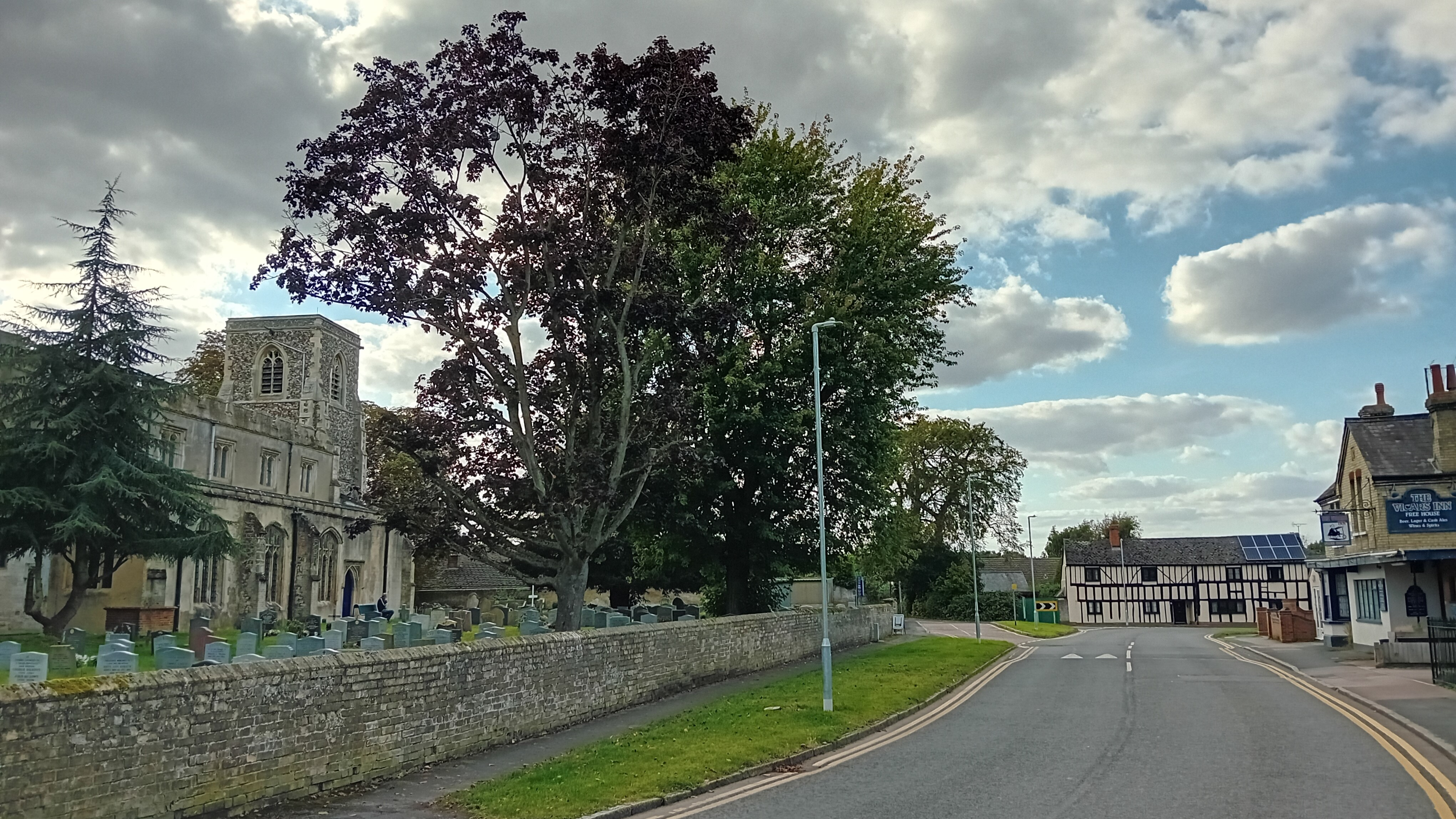
- Church End, Arlesey

- Location within Bedfordshire
- Population: 6,022 (Parish, 2021)
- OS grid reference: TL190357
- Unitary authority: Central Bedfordshire
- Ceremonial county: Bedfordshire
- Region: East
- Country: England
- Sovereign state: United Kingdom
- Post town: ARLESEY
- Postcode district: SG15
- Dialling code: 01462
- Police: Bedfordshire
- Fire: Bedfordshire
- Ambulance: East of England
- UK Parliament: Hitchin

Arlesey (/ˈɑːrlzi/ ARL-zee) is a town and civil parish in the Central Bedfordshire district of Bedfordshire, England. It is near the border with Hertfordshire, about three miles (4.8 km) north-west of Letchworth Garden City, four miles (6.4 km) north of Hitchin and six miles (9.7 km) south of Biggleswade. Arlesey railway station provides services to London, Stevenage and Peterborough. The Domesday Book of 1086 mentions Arlesey. The town's name means the 'island of a man named Aelfric'.

== History ==
The name Arlesey derives from the Old English Aelfricsēg meaning 'Aelfric's island'.

The area has a long history of habitation, with evidence of an Iron Age settlement having been found to the east of Arlesey around Chase Farm and Etonbury School.

To the north of Arlesey (north of the modern railway station) was a medieval manorial complex known as Etonbury. The site's origins and history are unclear and continue to be debated by archaeologists; interpretation is made particularly difficult due to the earthworks having been damaged during the construction of the railway. The complex possibly originated as an inland harbour on the River Hiz near its confluence with the River Ivel, and seems to have been fortified with various ditches and possibly moats. It appears to have been used as a Danish camp from the time of the Viking invasions from the 9th century onwards, but they may have re-fortified a pre-existing site. By the time of the Domesday Book in 1086, Etonbury had become a manor. The manor house there was subsequently abandoned, being described as "utterly decayed" in 1566.

The Great Northern Railway built its main line from London to York through Arlesey. The line opened in 1850 with a station at the northern end of the village called "Arlesey and Shefford Road", renamed "Arlesey and Henlow" in 1933. It closed in 1959. A new Arlesey railway station was later built on the site, opening in 1988.

The Three Counties Asylum opened immediately east of Arlesey in 1860. It was just over the boundary into the neighbouring parish of Stotfold, but was often described as being at Arlesey; the gates to its main West Drive entrance were in Arlesey, and from 1866 it was served by Three Counties railway station which was at the southern end of Arlesey. A tramway linked the station to the asylum. The asylum was later renamed Fairfield Hospital. It closed in 1999 and the buildings have been converted to housing and a new community called Fairfield built in the former grounds.

=== Industry ===
Arlesey had a thriving brick-making industry through to the mid twentieth century. As of 1900 there were five brickworks around Arlesey. They were known for the "Arlesey White" bricks produced from Gault clay. Bricks have not been produced there since 1992. Some clay pits have been used for landfill and others are now lakes. On the south-east side of the town there were two chalk pits operated by the Portland Cement Company, now filled with water and known respectively as the Blue Lagoon, used for sailing, and the Green Lagoon, used for fishing.

=== Second World War ===
During the Second World War there were two plane crashes at Arlesey. On 19 December 1943 a Handley Page Halifax belonging to 138 Squadron was in a collision with a chimney at Arlesey Brickworks. The aircraft BB364 (NF-R) had left its base at RAF Tempsford on a training mission. The crew of nine perished in the crash.

On 28 March 1944 a Lockheed Hudson belonging to 161 Squadron RAF crashed on the Arlesey to Stotfold road killing the crew. The aircraft FK767 had left its base at RAF Tempsford on a training flight.

== Governance ==
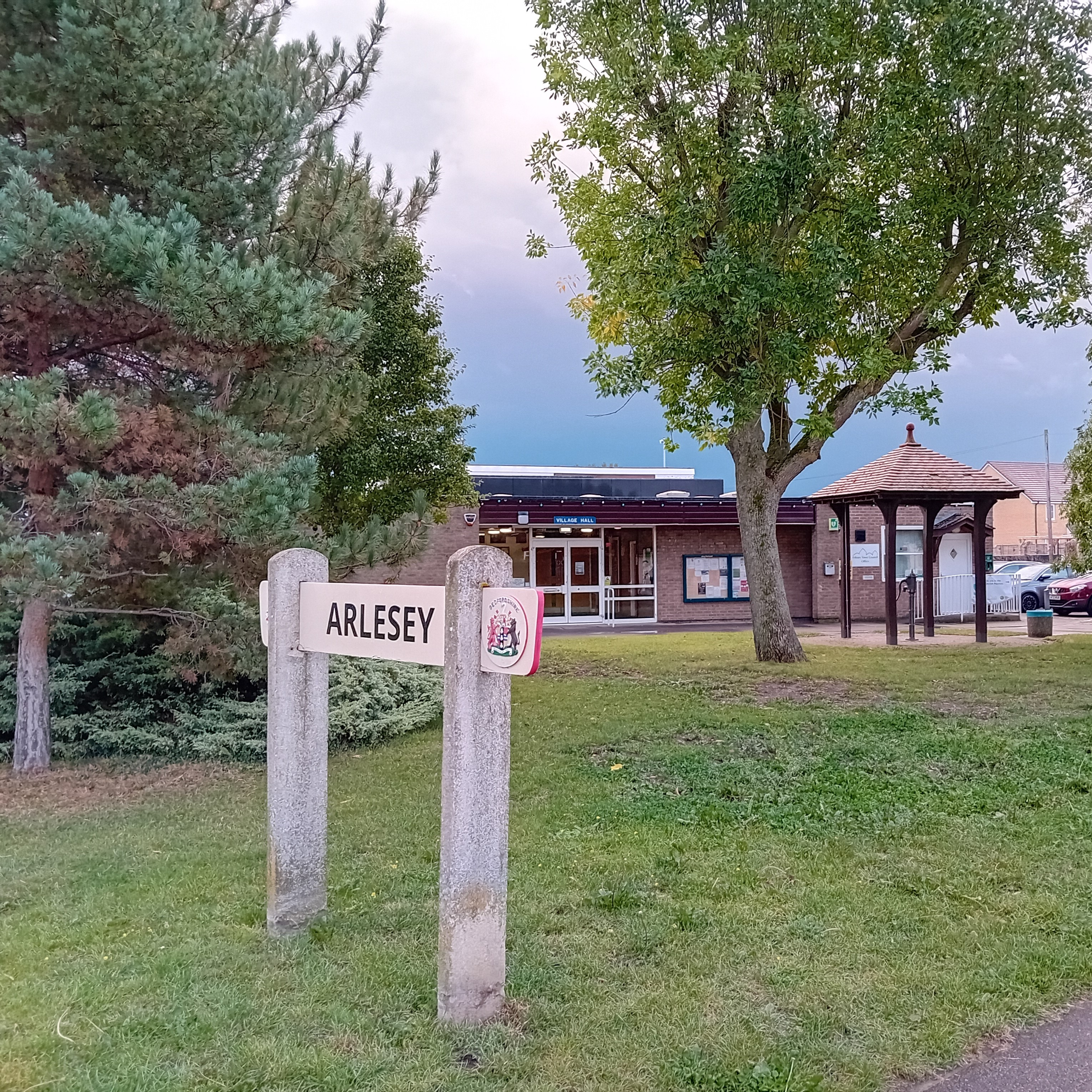
Village Hall and Town Council Offices, High Street

There are two tiers of local government covering Arlesey, at parish (town) and unitary authority level: Arlesey Town Council and Central Bedfordshire Council, based in Chicksands. The town council has its offices on High Street in a complex which also includes a community centre, library and Gothic Mede School.

== Demography ==
The population of Arlesey was 5,584 in 2,344 households in the 2011 census. In the census of 2011, 94.0% of people described themselves as white, 2.2% as having mixed or multiple ethnic groups, 2.9% as being Asian or British Asian, and less than 1.0% as having another ethnicity. In the same census, 55.8% described themselves as Christian, 34.6% described themselves as having no religion, 6.8% did not specify a religion, 1.2% described themselves as Sikh, and 1.7% described themselves as having a different religion. In the 2021 census, the population for Arlesey and Fairfield was 9,859 across 3,859 households. For ethnic groups, 88.3% reported being white, 1.0% as another ethnic group, 3.8% having mixed or multiple ethnic groups, 2.0% black or black British and 4.9% for being Asian or British Asian. For religion in the same census, 48.9% said they had no religion, 5% didn’t answer, 41.1% were Christian, 2.1% were Sikh, 1.3% were Hindu, 0.8% were Muslim, 0.2 were Jewish and 0.4% said they had other religions.

== Culture and community ==
Arlesey Old Moat and Glebe Meadows, adjacent to Arlesey railway station, is a nature reserve managed by the Wildlife Trust for Bedfordshire, Cambridgeshire and Northamptonshire, together with Arlesey Conservation for Nature.

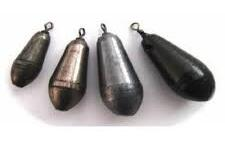
Arlesey Bomb

The Arlesey Bomb fishing weight was developed by angler Dick Walker to catch specimen perch from the local chalk pits.

== Media ==
Local news and television programmes are provided by BBC East and ITV Anglia. Television signals are received from the Sandy Heath TV transmitter. Local radio stations are BBC Three Counties Radio on 95.5 FM, Heart East on 96.9 FM and BigglesFM is a licensed community radio station transmitting from nearby Potton on 104.8 FM and online. Full-time broadcasting began in April 2011. The town is served by the local newspapers, The Comet, Biggleswade Chronicle, and The Stotfold and Arlesey News Magazines , a local magazine which is distributed free to every households in the town and Stotfold.

== Education ==
Fairfield Park Lower School takes pupils from nursery to Year 4. Ickleford Primary School takes pupils from Reception to year 6. Both are within 5 miles of Arlesey.

It is in the catchment zone for Samuel Whitbread Academy, which has an upper school and sixth form.

== Religious sites ==
St Peter's Church in Church End was built in the 12th century by the monks of Waltham Abbey. Its tower is a Victorian replacement after the original tower collapsed.

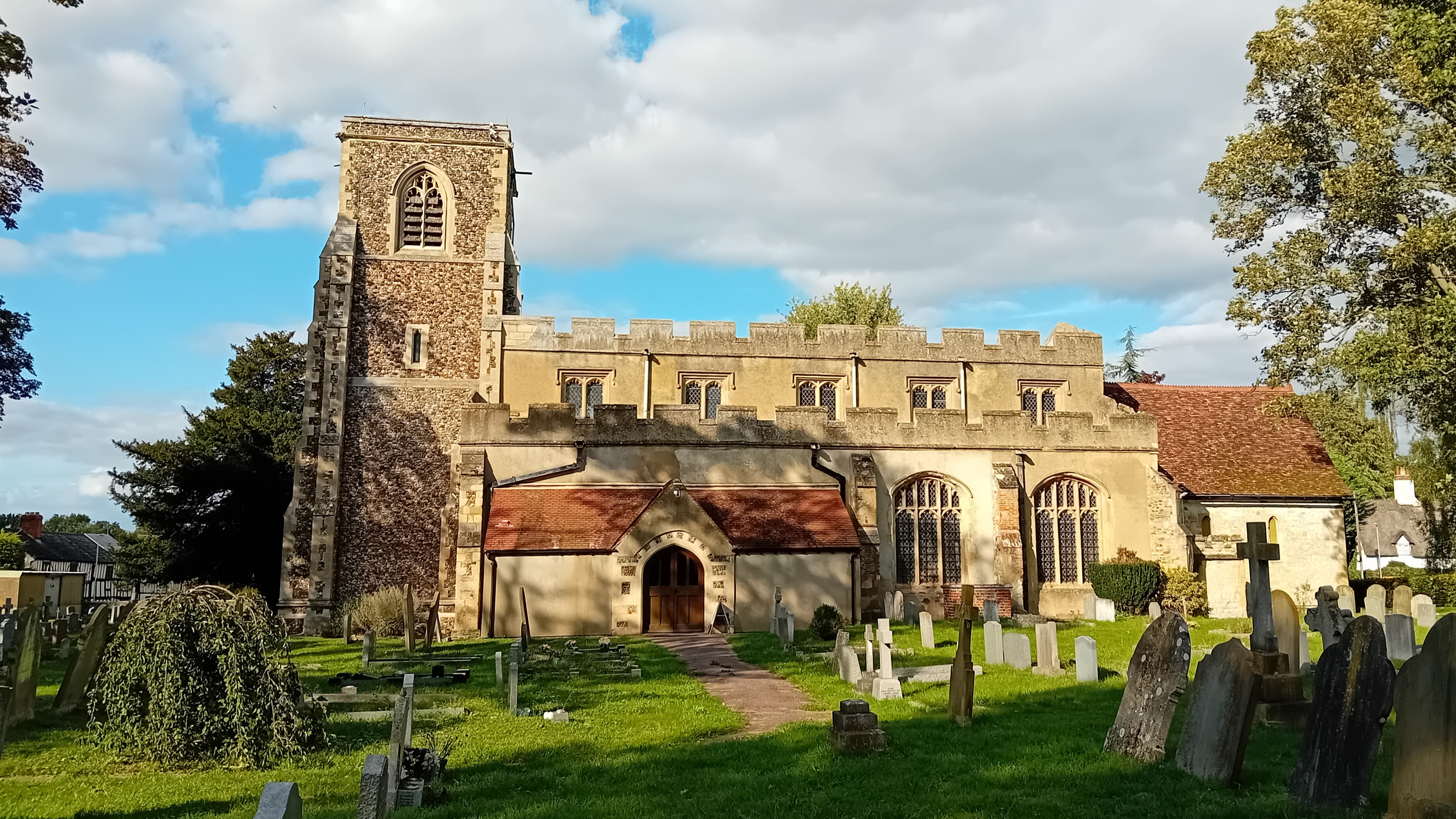
St Peter's Church

There is also a Methodist church in Arlesey.

== Notable residents ==
- Bill Kitchener - former professional footballer - West Ham United F.C., Torquay United F.C.
- Pat Kruse - former professional footballer - Leicester City F.C., Torquay United F.C., Brentford F.C.
- Scott Houghton - former professional footballer - Tottenham Hotspur, Luton Town, Walsall F.C., Peterborough United
- Stanley Brown (1907–1978) - Cricketer who was active in the late 1930s.

== Sport ==
The town's football team is Arlesey Town, who play at Hitchin Road. The town also has a basketball team called North Herts Knights.
