= Stanley Brown (cricketer, born 1907) =

English cricketer

Personal information
- Full name: Stanley Harold Brown
- Born: 15 March 1907; Arlesey, Bedfordshire, England
- Died: 15 June 1978 (aged 71); Hitchin, Hertfordshire, England
- Batting: Right-handed

Domestic team information
- Years: Team
- 1937–1938: Wiltshire
- 1930–1933: Marylebone Cricket Club

Career statistics
Competition	First-class
Matches	2
Runs scored	26
Batting average	8.66
100s/50s	–/–
Top score	21
Balls bowled	–
Wickets	–
Bowling average	–
5 wickets in innings	–
10 wickets in match	–
Best bowling	–
Catches/stumpings	1/–
- Source: Cricinfo, 17 April 2014

Stanley Harold Brown (15 March 1907 – 15 June 1978) was an English cricketer active in the late 1930s. Born at Arlesey, Bedfordshire, Brown was a right-handed batsman.

Brown two appearances in first-class cricket for the Marylebone Cricket Club at Lord's. He made one appearance in 1930 against Wales and a second appearance against Kent in 1933, scoring a total of 26 runs. He later played minor counties cricket for Wiltshire in the 1937 and 1938 Minor Counties Championship, making seven appearances.

He died at Hitchin, Hertfordshire on 15 June 1978.
