= Bobby Baxter (footballer, born 1937) =

English footballer (1937–2025)

Personal information
- Full name: Robert Denholm Baxter
- Date of birth: 4 February 1937
- Place of birth: Redcar, England
- Date of death: 1 January 2026 (aged 88)
- Place of death: Torquay, England
- Height: 5 ft 8 in (1.73 m)
- Positions: Inside forward; left-back

Senior career*
Years	Team	Apps	(Gls)
1959–1961	Darlington	64	(30)
1961–1967	Brighton & Hove Albion	195	(6)
1967–1969	Torquay United	62	(6)
1969–1970	Darlington	42	(1)
1970–197x	Plymouth City		
- * Club domestic league appearances and goals

Robert Denholm Baxter (4 February 1937 – 1 January 2026) was an English professional footballer who played in the Football League for Darlington, Brighton & Hove Albion and Torquay United. He was the son and namesake of Scotland and Middlesbrough footballer Bobby Baxter.

== Career ==
Baxter was born in Redcar, Yorkshire. He began his career by signing a professional contract on joining Darlington in November 1959. He began his professional career as a forward and was Darlington's top scorer for two seasons. After playing 64 league games and scoring 30 times he moved to Brighton & Hove Albion in June 1961 with Dennis Windross moving in the opposite direction. He had to wait until 25 November that year for his Brighton debut, at the Goldstone Ground against Preston North End. At Brighton he was converted to a wing half or full-back, and eventually made 195 league appearances, scoring six times, before moving to Torquay United in July 1967. He immediately settled into the Torquay first team at the start of the season, but lost his place when Bill Kitchener was signed on loan from West Ham United. Early in the following season, Kitchener signed permanently for Torquay and Baxter again lost his place. However, Baxter regained his place in the first team when Kitchener was switched to the centre of defence after the career-ending injury received by Torquay defender Alan Smith. After appearing in 62 league games (scoring six goals) for the Gulls, Baxter returned to Darlington in July 1969, playing just one further season in the football league before joining non-league Plymouth City in July 1970.

== Later life and death ==
In September 2001, Baxter, still a Torbay resident, returned to Plainmoor as a match summariser for BBC Radio for the game between Torquay and Scunthorpe United.

Baxter died on 1 January 2026, at the age of 88.
