= Nala (cat) =

Tabby cat in Stevenage railway station (c. 2019 – 2025)

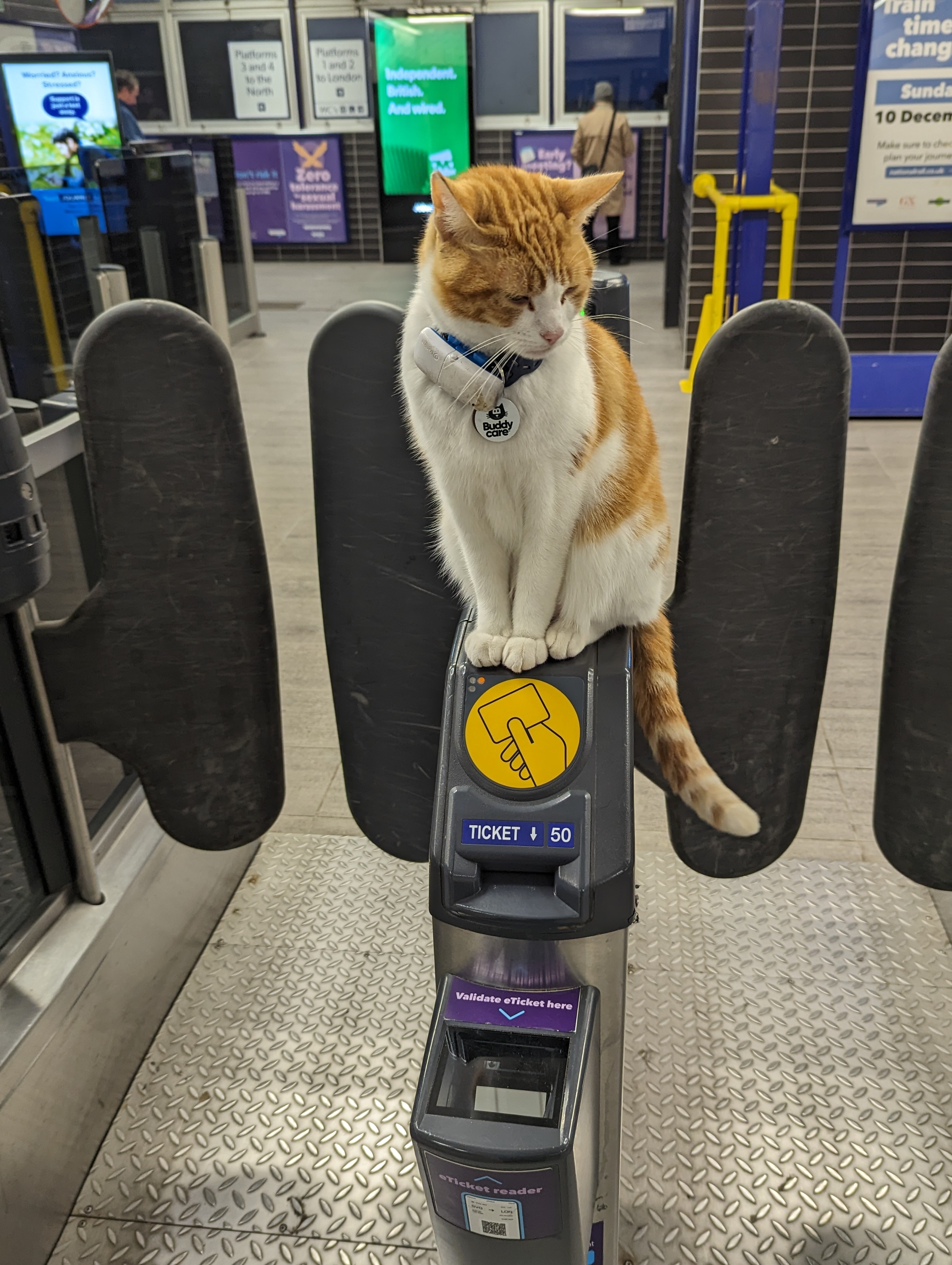
- Nala the cat sitting on a ticket barrier
- Species: Cat
- Breed: Moggy
- Sex: Male
- Born: c. 2019
- Died: December 2025 (aged 5–6)
- Known for: Sitting on the barriers at Stevenage railway station
- Owners: Natasha Ambler and Lewis Ames
- Residence: Stevenage, England
- Appearance: Ginger tabby
- Named after: Nala (The Lion King)

Nala (c. 2019 – December 2025) was a ginger tabby cat from Stevenage, Hertfordshire, England. She became known locally and online for sitting at the ticket barriers of Stevenage railway station, where commuters and visitors often stopped to pet her and take photos. Her popularity grew in October 2023 after her owner created a Facebook group to share images of her, leading to wider recognition in the community and on social media.

== Life ==
Nala lived approximately ten minutes from Stevenage railway station with her owners, Natasha Ambler and Lewis Ames. She was adopted through the RSPCA and had a brother, Simba, with whom she was named after characters from The Lion King.

From a young age, Nala regularly explored the surrounding area and frequently visited Stevenage railway station in the mornings and evenings. She was often observed sitting on ticket barriers, where commuters interacted with her and took photographs. Shortly after first being allowed outdoors, she was struck by a car; her owners later stated that this incident contributed to her becoming more cautious around roads and traffic.

Nala was fitted with a GPS tracking device, which recorded her movements around Stevenage. She was documented visiting the railway station, the nearby leisure park, and on one occasion spending most of a night inside a cinema. In a single week, she was recorded travelling 35 miles (56 km). Due to frequent calls from members of the public who believed she was lost, her owners added a second tag to her collar clarifying that she was not missing but accustomed to roaming.

On 7 December 2025, a Facebook group dedicated to Nala announced her death, describing her as "much more than a pet".

== Popularity ==
In October 2023, Nala rose to popularity in the local area and on the internet after her owner created a Facebook page called The Adventures of Nala, where hundreds of people shared their pictures of Nala. She drew national media attention, appearing on BBC News, Sky News and ITV's Lorraine, where she was dubbed the "unofficial ticket officer" of Stevenage station. Shaun Smith, Great Northern's station manager at Stevenage, praised the effects Nala was having on the community, saying "She's breaking down barriers by making people smile and starting cheerful conversations between staff and customers."

In addition to the Facebook page, which has over 25,000 followers, Nala has accounts on TikTok and Instagram where pictures and videos of her are shared. In November 2023, Nala released her debut Christmas single "Check Meowt", which initially premiered on BBC Three Counties Radio. Nala appears in the children's book Aliens at the Panto: With Nala the Cat, where her adventures around Stevenage include a visit to the annual pantomime at the Gordon Craig Theatre.

Katie Grant, an IT specialist onboard the RRS Sir David Attenborough, knew Nala from passing through the railway station. In 2024, Grant chose to include a photo of Nala, whom she describes as a social media "star", in the "Pets Corner" onboard the ship. Grant told the BBC this was "so Nala can bring joy to everyone who visits the Sir David Attenborough".

Following her death, a fundraising campaign was launched on GoFundMe to finance a commemorative statue at Stevenage railway station. In June 2026, the local council approved plans to install a 1.7 metre sculpture by artist Ben Twiston-Davies near the entrance to the train station.
