= Hitchin railway station =

Railway station in Hertfordshire, England

Coordinates: 51.953°N 0.263°W

Hitchin
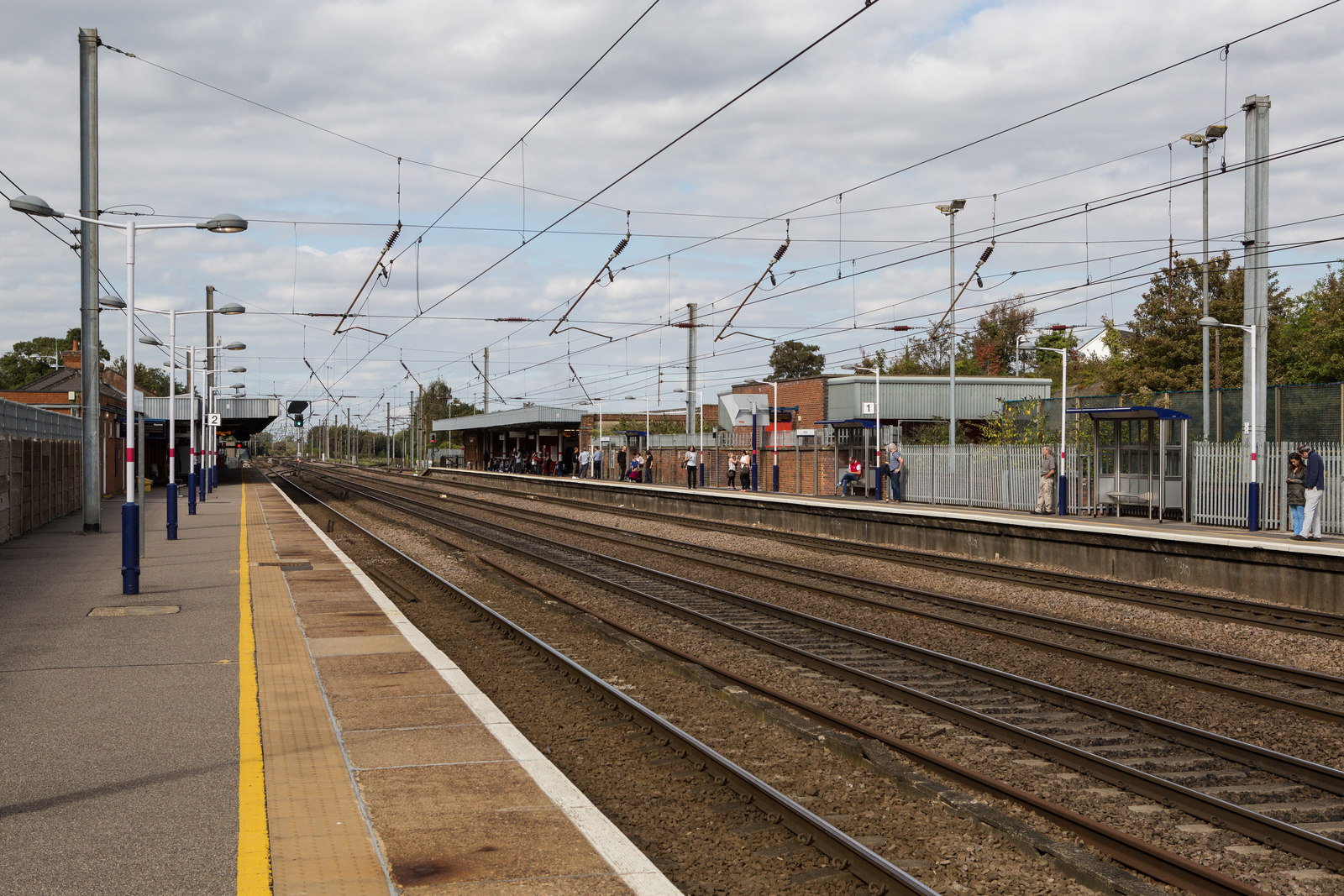
- The tracks and platforms

General information
- Location: Hitchin, North Hertfordshire; England
- Grid reference: TL194297
- Managed by: Great Northern
- Platforms: 2
- Tracks: 4

Other information
- Station code: HIT
- Classification: DfT category C2

History
- Original company: Great Northern Railway
- Post-grouping: London and North Eastern Railway

Key dates
- 7 August 1850: Station opened

Passengers
- 2020–21: ▼0.750 million
- Interchange: ▼45,488
- 2021–22: ▲1.981 million
- Interchange: ▲0.102 million
- 2022–23: ▲2.512 million
- Interchange: ▼77,171
- 2023–24: ▲2.682 million
- Interchange: ▲92,948
- 2024–25: ▲2.940 million
- Interchange: ▲0.171 million
Location
Notes
- Passenger statistics from the Office of Rail and Road

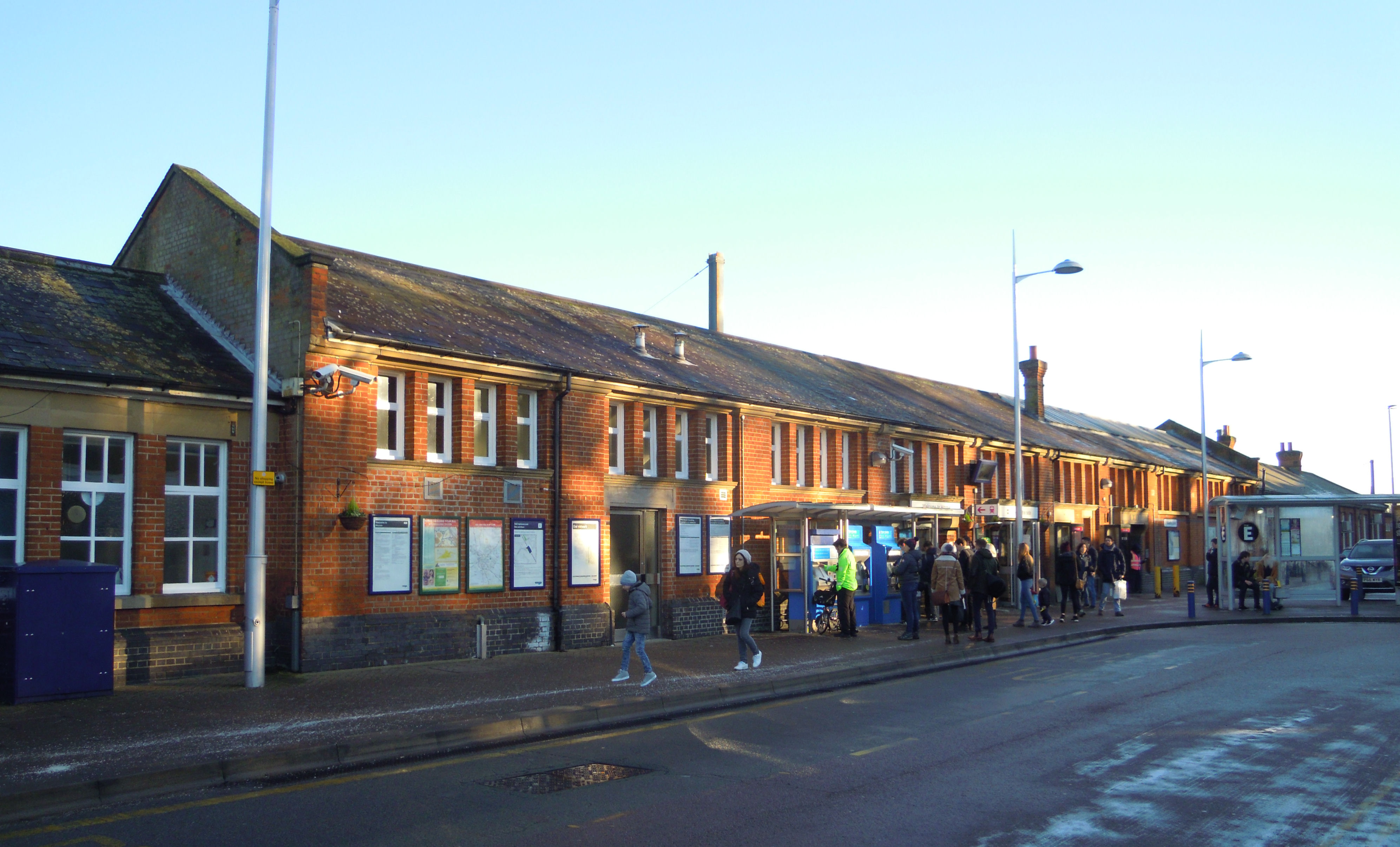
The front entrance to the station in 2017

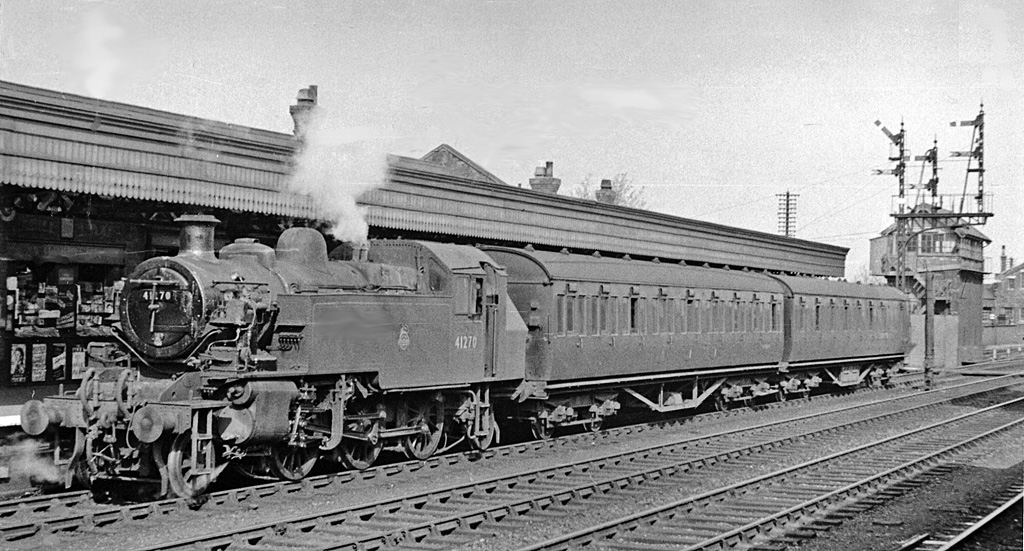
Auto-train to Bedford in 1955

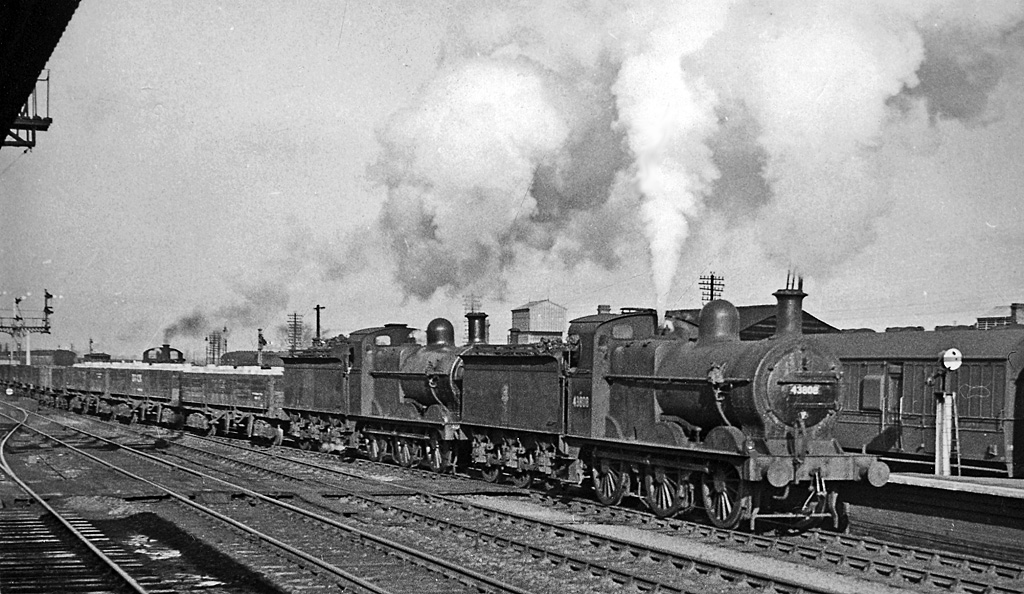
Double-headed train of bricks off Bedford line in 1957

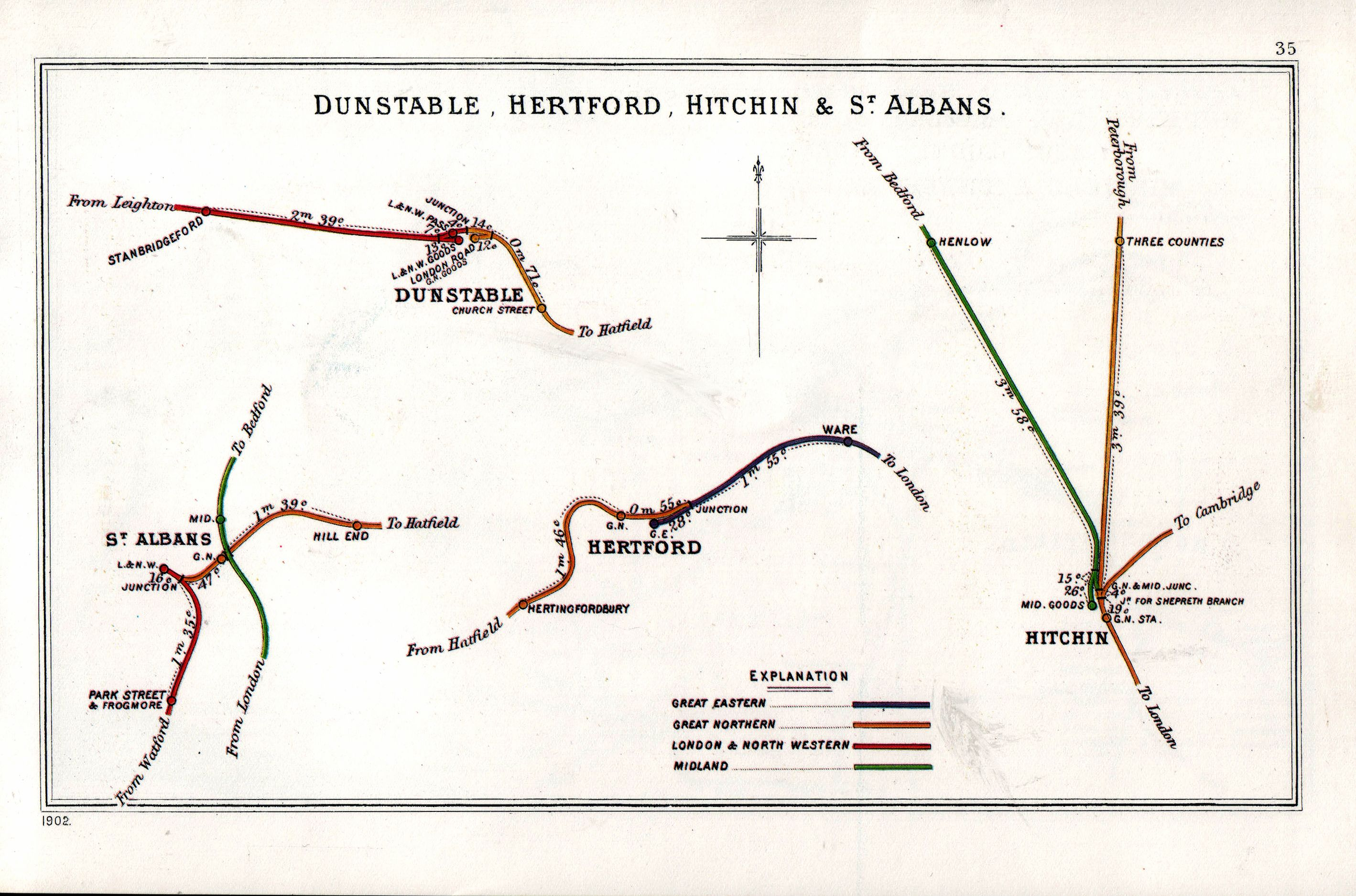
A 1902 Railway Clearing House map of railways in the vicinity of Hitchin (right)

Hitchin railway station serves the market town of Hitchin in Hertfordshire. It is located approximately 1 mile (1.6 km) north east of the town centre and 31 miles 74 chains (51.4 km) north of London King's Cross on the East Coast Main Line.

Until the current Stevenage station opened in 1973, many InterCity services stopped at Hitchin.

In August 2007, Hitchin was awarded Secure Station status after improvements to station security were made by First Capital Connect, including new lighting, extra CCTV and the installation of automatic ticket gates.

== History ==
The first section of the Great Northern Railway (GNR) – that from Louth to a junction with the Manchester, Sheffield and Lincolnshire Railway at Grimsby – opened on 1 March 1848, but the southern section of the main line, between Maiden Lane and Peterborough, was not opened until August 1850. Hitchin was one of the original stations, opening with the line on 7 August 1850.

On 21 October 1850 Hitchin became a junction station with the opening of the first section of the Royston and Hitchin Railway, between Hitchin and Royston (it was extended to Shepreth on 3 August 1851). The Midland Railway (MR) opened a route from Leicester via Bedford to Hitchin on 1 February 1858, by which MR trains used the GNR to reach London.

After the opening of the Midland Railway's own line from Bedford via Luton to London, and the line's terminus at St. Pancras in 1868, their line between Bedford and Hitchin was reduced to branch status. It lost its passenger service in 1961 and was closed completely in 1964, with the exception of a stub from Bedford to Cardington which itself was closed in 1969. In May 1964 part of the line was used for the railway scene in the film Those Magnificent Men in their Flying Machines. The embankment for the line could, until early 2012, still be walked from just north of the station, through the fields to Ickleford, but this section is now closed off. Opened in June 2013 a new embankment now carries a single-track line onto a viaduct for Letchworth-bound trains over the East Coast Main Line as part of the Hitchin Flyover project.

== Accidents and incidents ==
- On 14 April 1949, the solicitor and historian Reginald Hine committed rail suicide when he jumped in front of a train.
- On 19 November 1958, a freight train hauled by BR Standard Class 9F 2-10-0 No. 92187 overran signals and collided with another. A third freight train, hauled by ex-LNER Class V2 2-6-2 No. 60885, ran into the wreckage.

== Facilities ==
There are platforms on only the two Slow lines; they are long enough for 12-car trains.

Following a refurbishment of the station by First Capital Connect in 2007, the station's subway was refurbished at a cost of £300k. The refurbishment also involved general cosmetic work throughout the station and a new high quality waiting room in the existing station buildings on Platform 2. This waiting room is fully accessible at all times through automatic doors.

The station has a large booking office with touch-screen ticket machines. The station has help points throughout. A small shop is located by the stairs on Platform 2 and there are vending machines throughout the station. Automatic ticket gates at the station entrance were installed by First Capital Connect during 2007.

The station's bicycle facilities were completely upgraded in 2007 and now include sheltered spaces for 68 bicycles next to the station buildings.

In 2013, Network Rail proposed plans for new lifts, one on each platform, to improve access via the existing subway for those with pushchairs or disabilities, funded through the Department for Transport's Access for All scheme. The new lifts opened in September 2014 after a two-month delay, giving step-free access to the southbound number 1 platform.

=== Hitchin Up Yard ===
Hitchin Up Yard is a small stabling point and freight terminal situated next to the East Coast Main Line just north of the station. A Great Northern train driver depot is located near the station on the down (northbound) side of the ECML.

== Services ==
Services at Hitchin are operated by Great Northern and Thameslink using Class 387 and 700 EMUs.

The typical off-peak service in trains per hour is:

- 2 tph to London King's Cross (stopping at most stations to Potters Bar, then Alexandra Palace and Finsbury Park)
- 2 tph to Brighton via Central London and Gatwick Airport (express from Stevenage)
- 2 tph to Horsham via Central London, Redhill and Gatwick Airport (express as above)
- 2 tph to Peterborough
- 1 tph to Letchworth Garden City
- 3 tph to Cambridge (2 of these run semi-fast and 1 calls at all stations)

Additional services call at the station during peak hours.

Preceding station	National Rail	Following station
Stevenage	Great Northern Cambridge Line	Letchworth Garden City
Stevenage	Thameslink Cambridge Line	Letchworth Garden City
Stevenage	Thameslink Great Northern Route	Arlesey
Historical railways
Stevenage Line open, station relocated	Great Northern Railway East Coast Main Line	Three Counties Line open, station closed
Disused railways
Henlow Camp Line and station closed	London, Midland and Scottish Railway Bedford to Hitchin Line	Terminus

== Hitchin flyover ==
Down trains from London to Cambridge used to use a ladder crossing over the up lines in order to reach the Cambridge Line, which often caused significant delays to trains in both directions. Together with the Digswell Viaduct some 10 miles (16 km) to the south, the flat junction just north of Hitchin was a major bottleneck.

In June 2013 Network Rail completed a flyover to carry Down trains to Cambridge over the main line, built at a final cost of £47 million.
