= Letchworth Garden City railway station =

Railway station in Hertfordshire, England

Letchworth Garden City
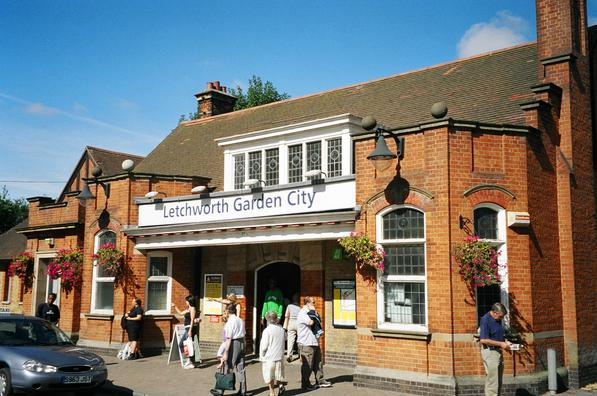
- The entrance to the station

General information
- Location: Letchworth, District of North Hertfordshire; England
- Coordinates: 51°58′49″N 0°13′45″W
- Grid reference: TL217327
- Owner: Network Rail
- Manager: Great Northern
- Platforms: 2

Other information
- Station code: LET
- Classification: DfT category D

Key dates
- 1903: Opened (restricted service)
- 15 April 1905: Opened (full service)
- 18 May 1913: Station relocated
- October 1937: Renamed Letchworth
- 11 June 1999: Renamed Letchworth Garden City

Passengers
- 2020–21: ▼0.458 million
- 2021–22: ▲1.189 million
- 2022–23: ▲1.471 million
- 2023–24: ▲1.598 million
- 2024–25: ▲1.780 million
Location
Notes
- Passenger statistics from the Office of Rail and Road

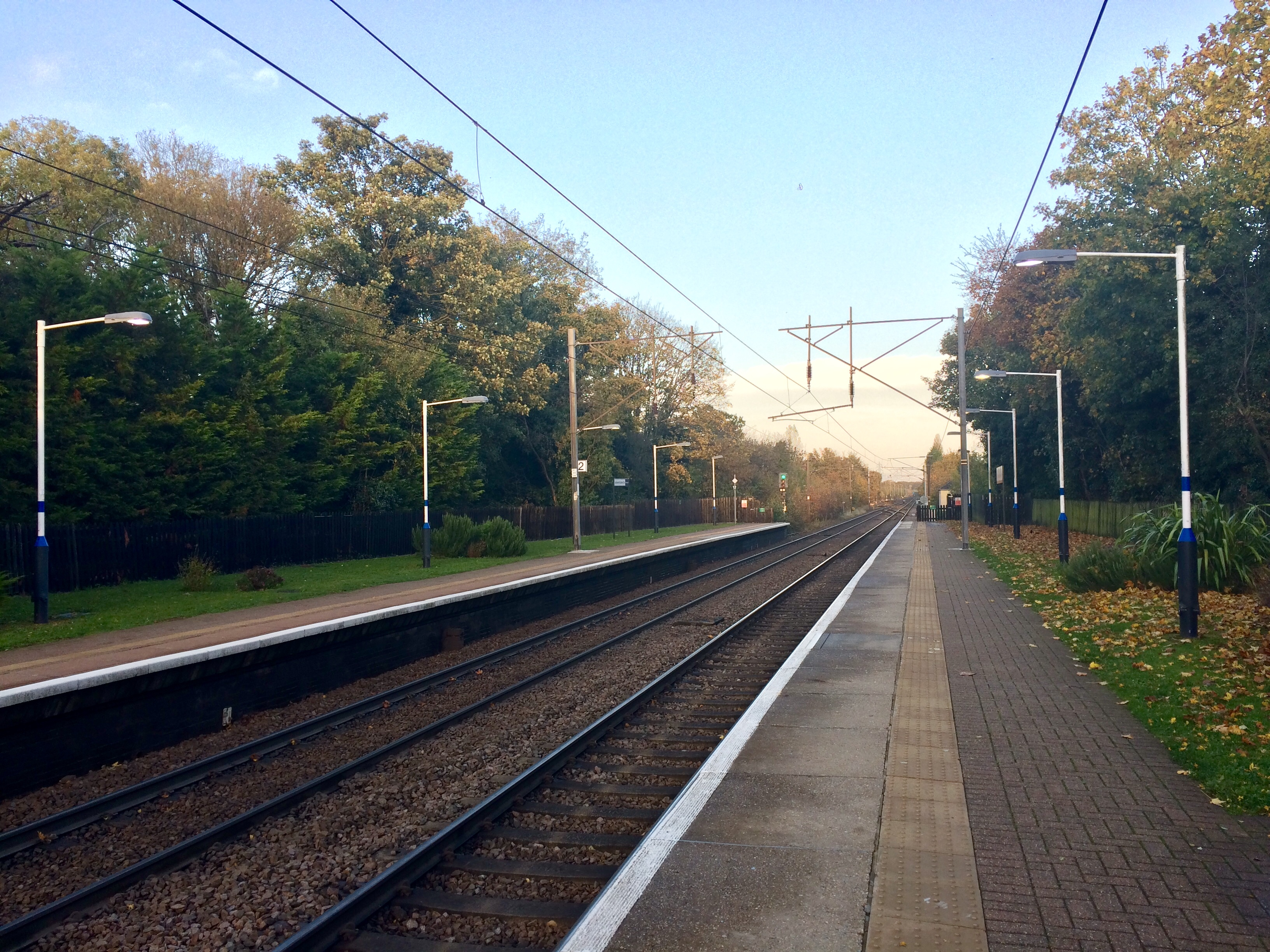
The platforms, with planting to the side of each

Letchworth Garden City station serves the town of Letchworth in Hertfordshire, England. The station is on the Cambridge Line 34 miles 50 chains (55.7 km) north of London King's Cross, and is a stop for services between King's Cross and Cambridge. Trains which serve the station are operated by Great Northern and Thameslink.

== History ==
The first station known as Letchworth Garden City was opened in 1903, with a restricted service; it gained a full passenger service on 15 April 1905. On 18 May 1913, this station was replaced by a new station on a different site. The new station was built in 1912, in the Arts and Crafts style, and has since been Grade II listed.

The station was originally intended to have two island platforms, giving a total of four platforms. However, since its opening only two platforms have been used. It was known from October 1937 as Letchworth, until it regained its current name on 11 June 1999 following a refurbishment scheme. Electric operation at the station was inaugurated in 1978, as part of the Kings Cross Outer Suburban scheme, though the wires initially ended at Royston. Through electric services to Cambridge began in May 1988.

The platforms were extended initially for eight carriages, and further extended in December 2011 for 12-carriage trains.

Passenger lifts were installed in two new towers in March 2014.

To the north of the station are the sidings where trains starting or terminating at Letchworth are cleaned and stabled.

Ticket barriers are in operation.

The station was used as a filming location for the 2013 film The World's End; it was converted into a pub named "The Hole in the Wall".

== Services ==
Services at Letchworth Garden City are operated by Thameslink and Great Northern using Class 379,Class 387 and 700 EMUs.

The typical off-peak service in trains per hour is:

- 2 tph to London King's Cross (stopping)
- 2 tph to Brighton via London Bridge and Gatwick Airport (semi-fast)
- 3 tph to Cambridge (2 of these run semi-fast and 1 calls at all stations)

During the peak hours, the all stations service to Cambridge is increased to 2 tph, and the station is served by an additional half-hourly service between London King's Cross and King's Lynn via Ely which runs non-stop to and from London King's Cross.

On Sundays, the stopping services to and from London King's Cross, and the services between Brighton and Cambridge are reduced to hourly.

Preceding station	National Rail	Following station
Hitchin	Thameslink Hitchin to Cambridge Line	Baldock
Hitchin	Great Northern Hitchin to Cambridge Line	Baldock or Terminus
London King's Cross	Great Northern Fen Line Peak Hours Only	Royston

== In popular culture ==
Letchworth Station by Spencer Gore, 1912

Letchworth Station (Oil on canvas, 1911) by Spencer Gore is notable as an early depiction of rail commuters. From the collection of J. Peter W. Cochrane.
