= Three Counties railway station =

Former railway station in Bedfordshire, England

Coordinates: 52.0060°N 0.2687°W

Three Counties
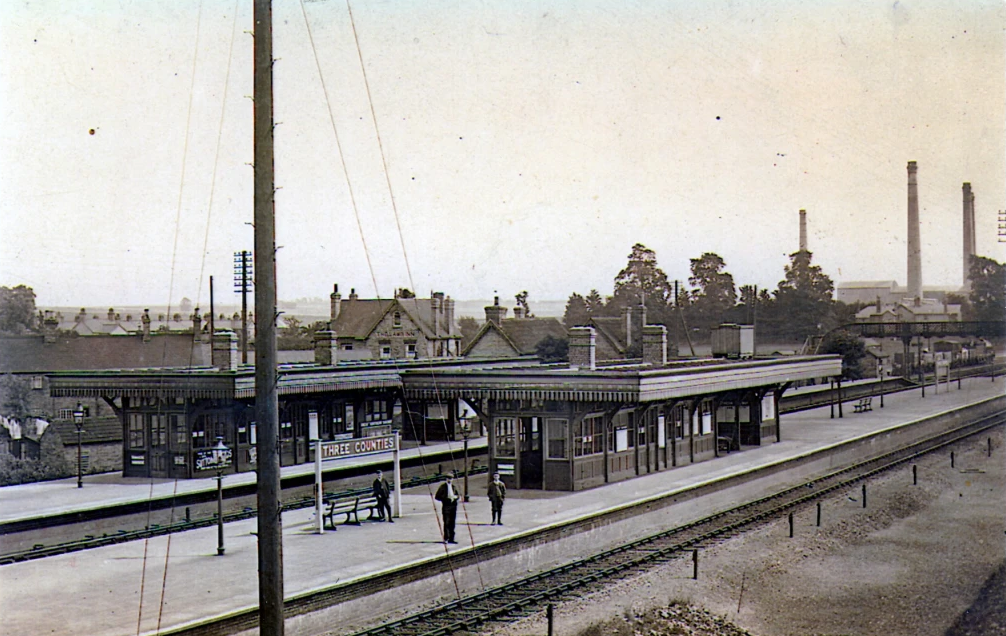
- The station (c. 1911)

General information
- Location: Arlesey, District of Central Bedfordshire; England
- Grid reference: TL189355
- Platforms: 2

Other information
- Status: Disused

History
- Original company: Great Northern Railway
- Post-grouping: London and North Eastern Railway

Key dates
- 1 April 1866: Station opens as Arlesey Siding
- 1 July 1886: Station renamed Three Counties
- 5 January 1959: Station closes
Location

Three Counties railway station is a disused railway station near Arlesey in Bedfordshire, England. It served the southern environs of Arlesey. These included the Three Counties Lunatic Asylum, which was finally subsequently known as the Fairfield Hospital. The station was north of Hitchin on the "London-Peterborough" line. It opened in 1866, and closed to passengers in 1959.

== History ==
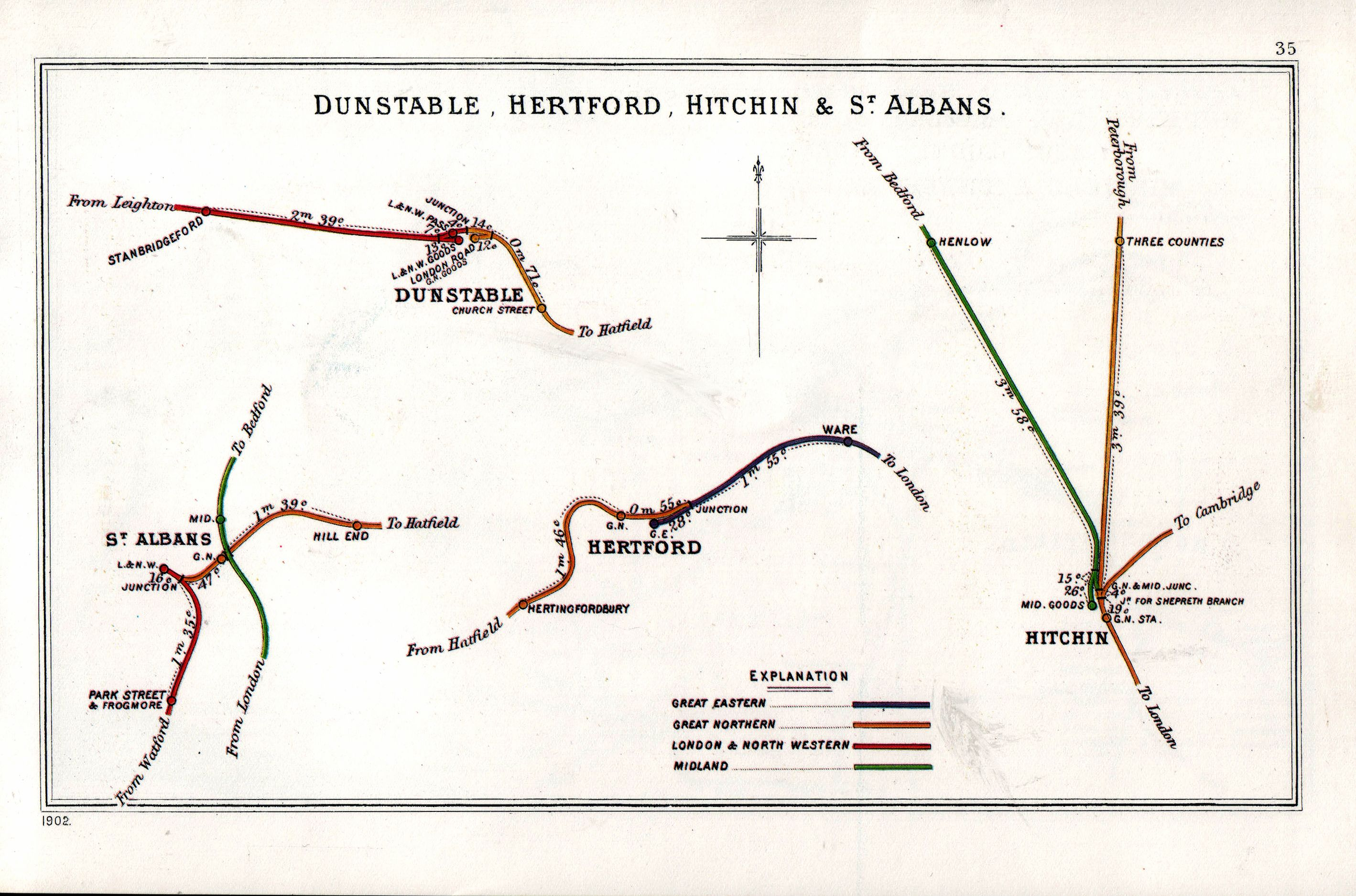
A 1902 Railway Clearing House map of railways in the vicinity of Three Counties (upper right)

The station was opened by the Great Northern Railway (GNR) on 1 April 1866, originally being named Arlesey Siding. On 1 July 1886, the station was renamed Three Counties, taking its new name from the nearby Three Counties Asylum, which itself was so named because it was a joint project of three counties - Hertfordshire, Bedfordshire and Huntingdonshire.

The GNR became part of the London and North Eastern Railway during the Grouping of 1923. The station then passed on to the Eastern Region of British Railways on nationalisation in 1948.

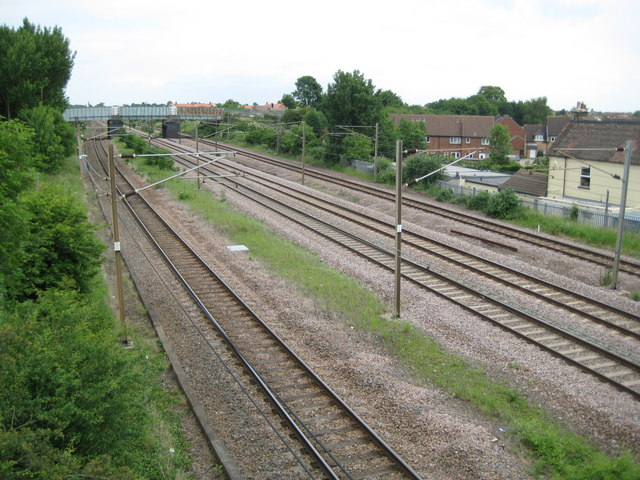
The station site in 2010

The station was closed to passengers, together with the adjacent Arlesey station, on 5 January 1959 and goods on 28 November 1960. This was due to declining receipts. Arlesey, however, later re-opened.

== Notes ==
Preceding station	Historical railways	Following station
Hitchin; Line and station open	Great Northern Railway; East Coast Main Line	Arlesey; Line and station open
