= Arlesey railway station =

Railway station in Bedfordshire, England

Coordinates: 52.026°N 0.266°W

Arlesey
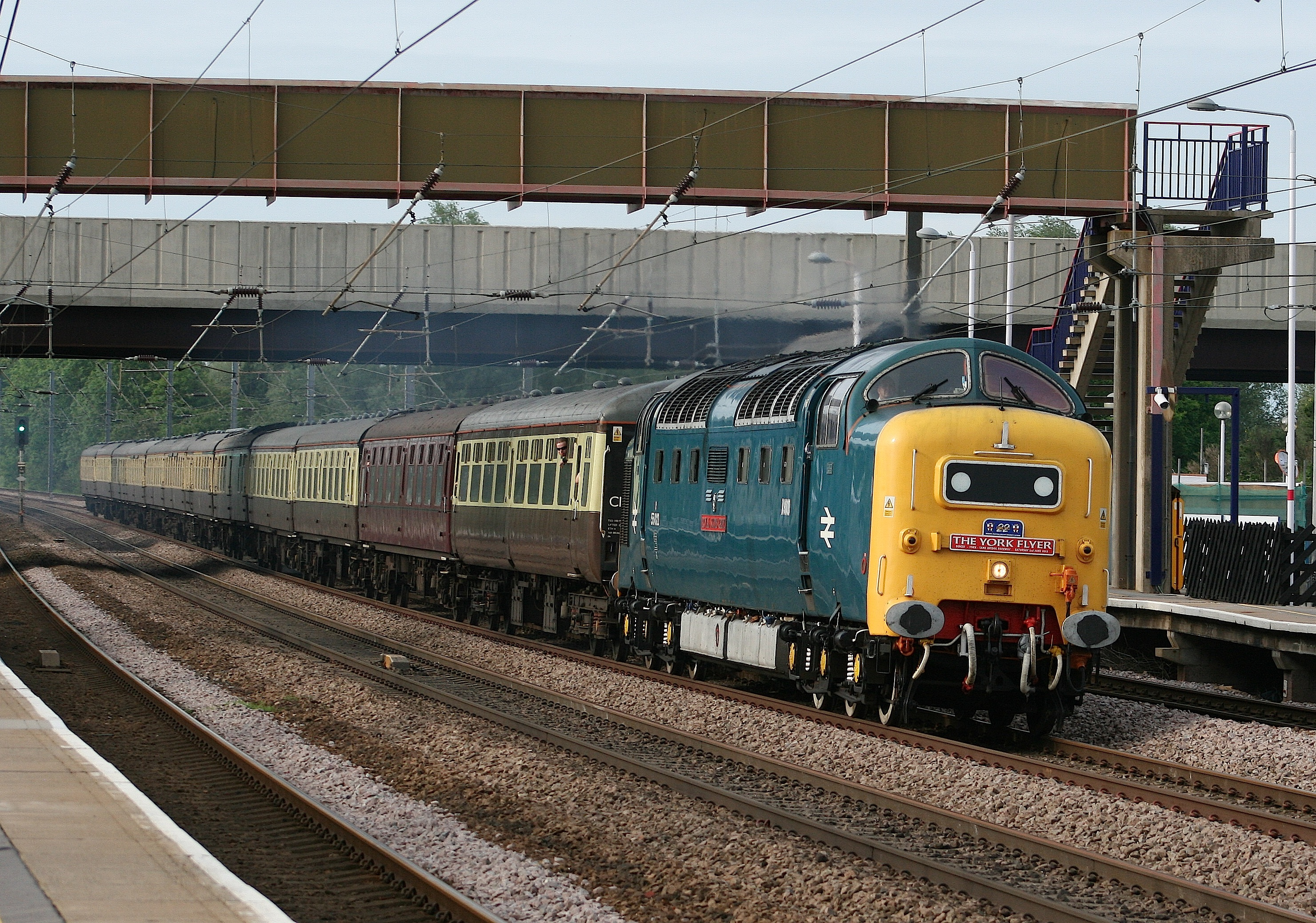

General information
- Local authority: Arlesey, Central Bedfordshire
- Grid reference: TL190378
- Managed by: Great Northern
- Number of platforms: 2
- Tracks: 4

National Rail annual entry and exit
- 2020–21: ▼0.153 million
- 2021–22: ▲0.407 million
- 2022–23: ▲0.552 million
- 2023–24: ▲0.592 million
- 2024–25: ▲0.688 million

Key dates
- 7 August 1850: Opened as Arlsey and Shefford Road
- March 1860: Renamed Arlesey and Shefford Road
- July 1893: Renamed Arlesey
- July 1895: Renamed Arlesey and Shefford Road
- 1 March 1933: Renamed Arlesey and Henlow
- 5 January 1959: Closed
- 3 October 1988: Reopened as Arlesey

Other information

Arlesey railway station serves the town of Arlesey in Bedfordshire, England. It is 37 miles 3 chains (37.04 miles, 59.61 km) from London King's Cross on the East Coast Main Line. Arlesey is managed by Great Northern, but from December 2019 all services to the station have been operated by Thameslink, due to significant rebranding across their network.

Arlesey is the nearest station to the towns of Stotfold and Shefford, and to the villages of Langford, Clifton and Henlow.

== History ==
=== Original station ===
The first section of the Great Northern Railway (GNR) (from Louth to a junction with the Manchester, Sheffield and Lincolnshire Railway at Grimsby) opened on 1 March 1848; but the southern section of the main line (from Maiden Lane to Peterborough) was not opened until 7 August 1850. One of the 1850 stations was Arlsey and Shefford Road. It was renamed Arlesey and Shefford Road in March 1860, but the shorter name of Arlesey was used between July 1893 and July 1895. The GNR became part of the London and North Eastern Railway (LNER) during the grouping of 1923. On 1 March 1933 the LNER renamed the station Arlesey and Henlow. The station passed to the Eastern Region of British Railways on nationalisation in 1948.

Due to declining receipts, both Arlesey and nearby Three Counties stations were closed to passengers on 5 January 1959, with goods services being withdrawn on 28 November 1960. The buildings were demolished shortly thereafter.

==== Accidents ====
Two goods trains collided north of Arlesey on 5 July 1890, when the front of one train ran into the rear portion of another, which had come to a standstill after the coupling between two wagons broke.

On 30 October 1927, the station building and goods shed received significant damage when they were hit by around 50 goods wagons and a guard's van, these having run away down the steep incline to Arlesey whilst being shunted near Hitchin, some four miles distant. Only prompt action by the signalman at Arlesey averted a major disaster, as he was able to stop a Cleethorpes – London King's Cross express passenger train in time to prevent it crashing headlong into the wagons, when the latter were still moving.

A similar incident occurred in July 1954, when a King's Cross – Aberdeen service was halted by the signalman at Three Counties before it could plough into the wreckage of a goods train, which had become derailed to the south of the station.

=== Present station ===
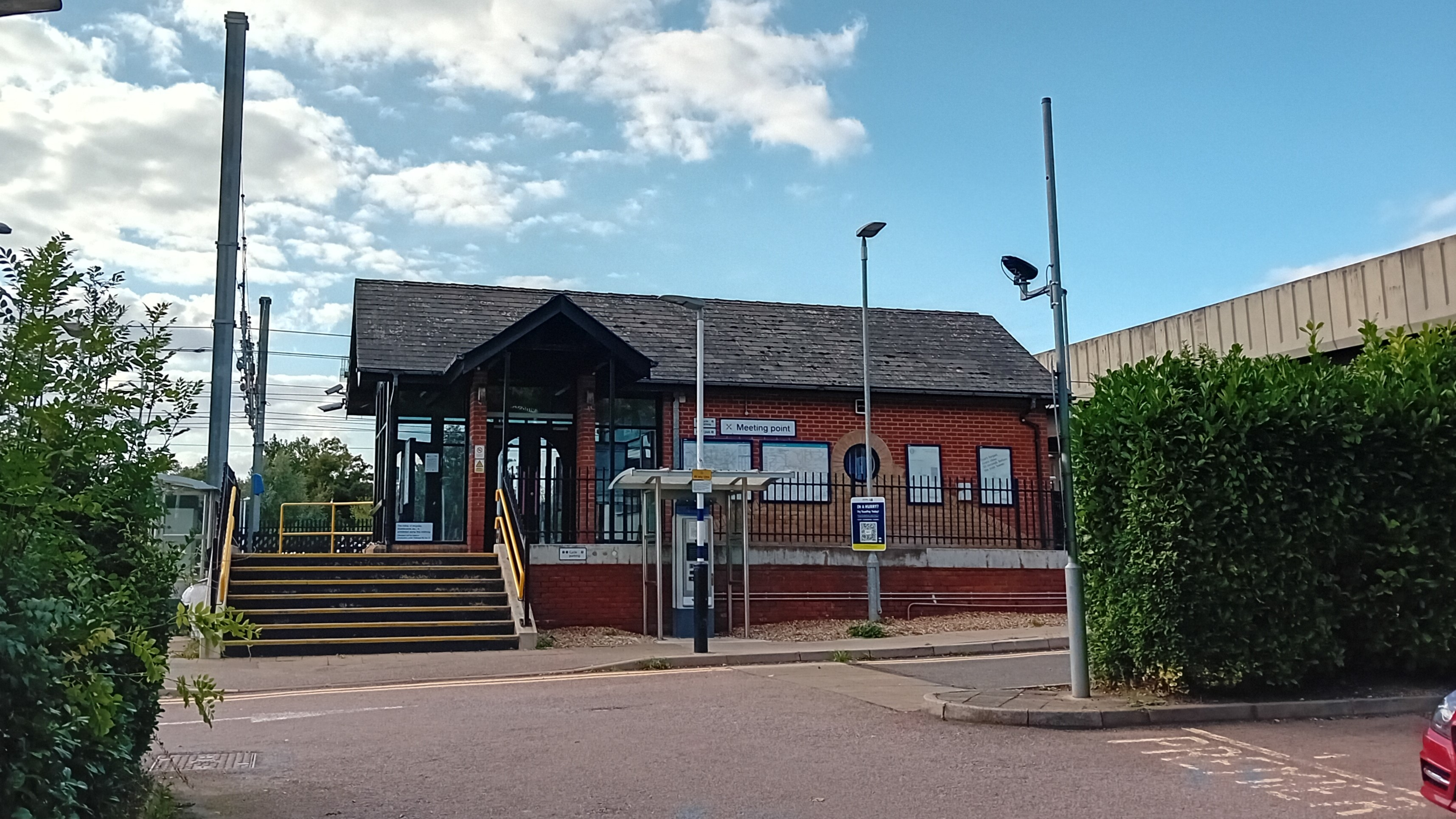
Modern station building

The line, however, remained open; and the present station built by Network SouthEast opened on 3 October 1988 on the site of the original station in the Church End area of Arlesey. The rebuilt station was designed to be fully accessible to wheelchairs but was initially unusable by those who could not leave their chair as there were no facilities for 'loading and unloading'. First Capital Connect provided the station with ramps in 2006, and users now simply have to ring 24 hours in advance for assistance.

Queen Elizabeth II, accompanied by Prince Philip, Duke of Edinburgh, visited the station on 17 November 2006, after arriving on the Royal Train.

The station's platforms are currently being lengthened to accommodate 12 car trains scheduled to serve the station upon completion of the Thameslink Programme.

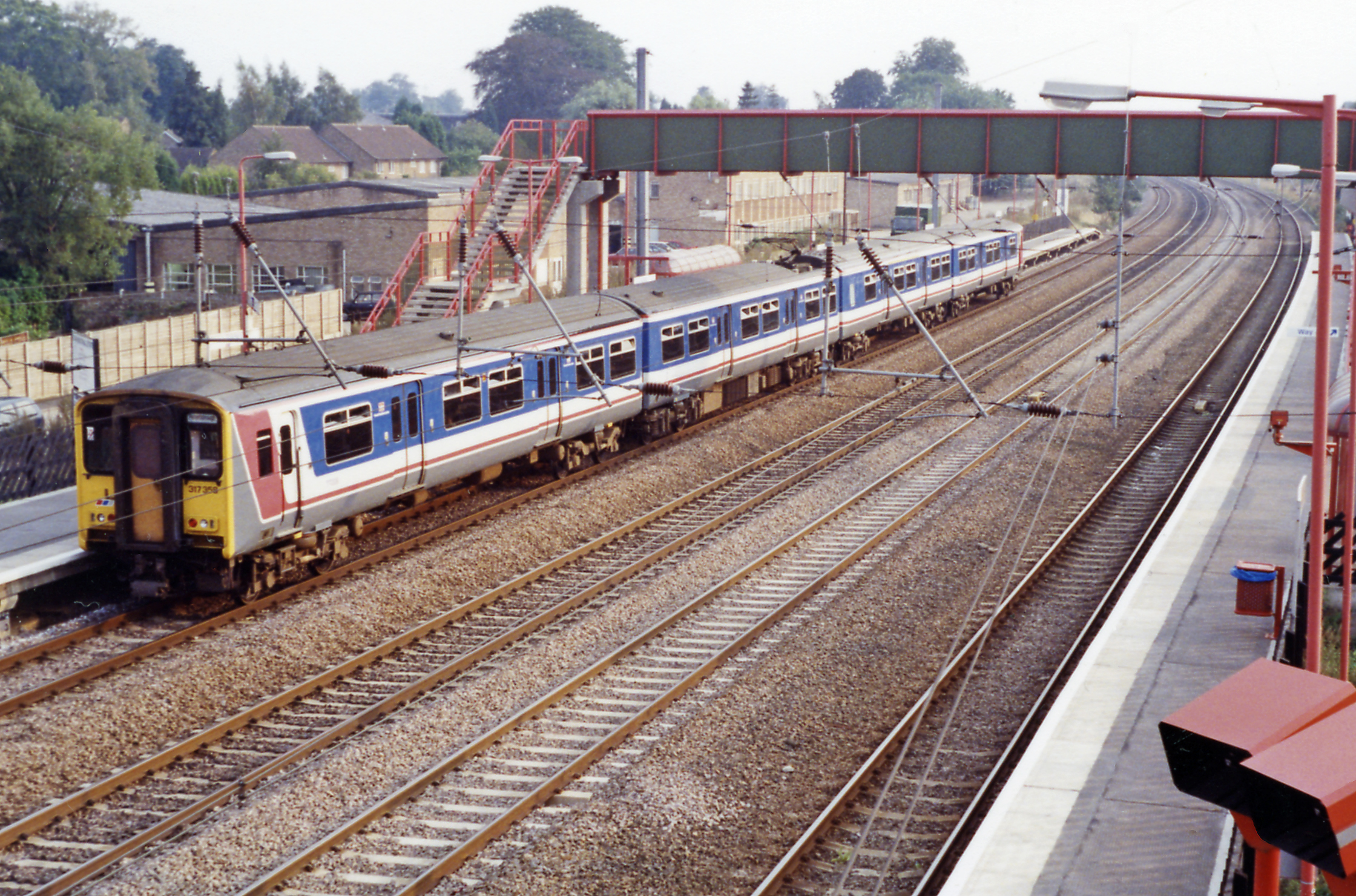
Platform view 1991

== Facilities ==
The station is fully accessible to wheelchair users, but is not accessible platform to platform. There is no access to ticket machines or help point on the down (Peterborough) platform. FCC installed modern LED lights on both platforms in 2009.

The station has two small shelters on both platforms.

There is a ticket office on the southbound platform and 2 modern Touch Screen ticket machines located adjacent to the booking office. Cycle storage is provided on both sides of the station; although only the southbound side has secure storage. First Capital Connect installed a help point on Platform 1. Arlesey station does not currently have automatic ticket gates. Train running information is provided via digital CIS displays, automated announcements and a customer help point on platform 1.

== Services ==
All services at Arlesey are operated by Thameslink using Class 700 EMUs.

The typical off-peak service in trains per hour is:

- 2 tph to Horsham via London Bridge, Redhill and Gatwick Airport
- 2 tph to Peterborough (all stations)

On Sundays, the service is reduced to hourly and southbound services run to London King's Cross instead of Horsham.

Preceding station	National Rail	Following station
Hitchin	Thameslink Great Northern Route	Biggleswade
	Historical railways	
Three Counties Line open, station closed	Great Northern Railway East Coast Main Line	Biggleswade Line and station open

== Ticket office opening times and station staffing hours ==
Below are the current opening and staffing times for Arlesey, as of 2017.

Ticket Office Hours
Day	Opens	Closes
Monday to Friday	06:45	12:10
Saturday	07:45	13:10
Sunday	—	—

Station Staffing Hours
Day	From	Until
Monday to Friday	06:30	12:30
Saturday	07:30	13:30
Sunday	—	—
