= Thameslink =

Main line railway route in south-east England

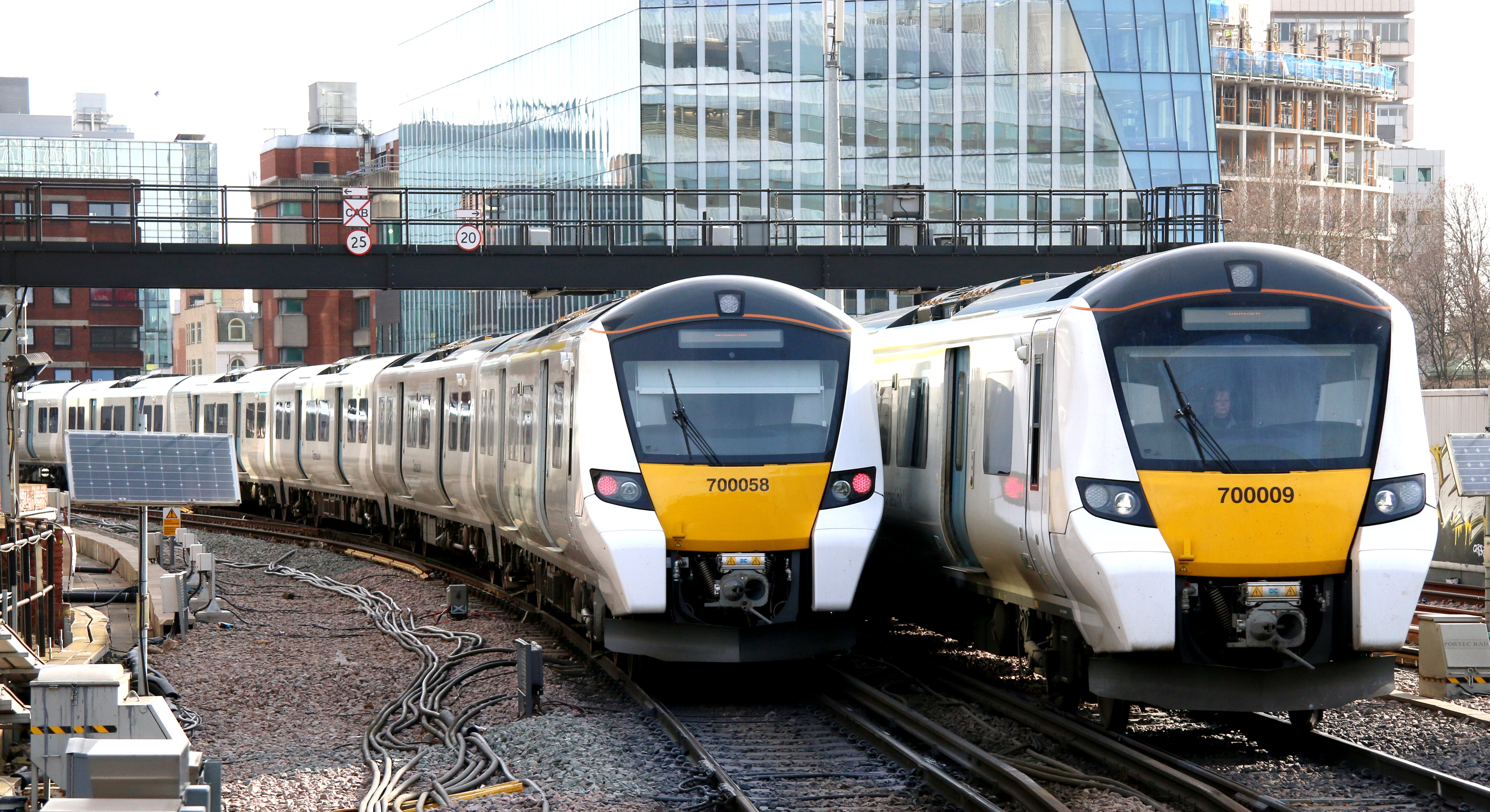
- Two Govia Thameslink Railway Class 700 Desiro City trains at Blackfriars.

Overview
- Locale: South East England, Greater London, East of England
- Predecessor: Thameslink 2 Mar 1997 – 31 Mar 2006; First Capital Connect 1 Apr 2006 – 13 Sep 2014; Govia Thameslink Railway 14 Sep 2014 – 31 May 2026
- Current operator: Greater Thameslink Railway
- Website: www.thameslinkrailway.com

Route
- Termini: Bedford; Blackfriars; Peterborough; Cambridge, Sutton; Orpington; Sevenoaks; Rainham; Horsham; Three Bridges; Brighton; East Grinstead
- Train number: TL
- Lines used: Brighton Main Line, Chatham Main Line, East Coast Main Line, Midland Main Line, Snow Hill tunnel, South Eastern Main Line, North Kent Line, Sutton Loop Line

Technical
- Rolling stock: Class 700 Desiro City
- Track gauge: 1,435 mm (4 ft 8 1/2 in) standard gauge
- Electrification: Overhead line, 25 kV 50 Hz AC; Third rail, 750 V DC
- Track owner: Network Rail
Route map

Thameslink is a main line route on the British railway network which connects destinations north and south of London via tunnels under Central London. It runs from Bedford, Luton, St Albans City, Peterborough, Welwyn Garden City, London Blackfriars and Cambridge to Sutton, Orpington, Sevenoaks, Rainham, Horsham, Three Bridges, Brighton and East Grinstead. The initial network opened as a through service in 1988 and, as of 2025, calls at 135 stations in regular service. A part of the route, from Bedford to Three Bridges, runs 24 hours a day, except on early Sunday mornings and during maintenance periods.

The Thameslink Programme was a major £7 billion scheme to increase capacity on the central London section by accommodating more frequent and longer trains, and providing additional routes and destinations. The programme was divided into three key phases, with the final Key Output 2 introducing world-first Automatic Train Operation (ATO) technology over European Train Control System (ETCS) Level 2, enabling 24 trains per hour through the core section. The new services began operating in 2018, though the full projected timetable of 24 trains per hour has never been achieved. Passenger service on the route use purpose-built Class 700 trains, which were introduced in 2016.

Passenger services on the Thameslink route, along with all others operated by Govia Thameslink Railway, transferred to the state-owned Greater Thameslink Railway on 31 May 2026.

== Route ==
Much of the original route is over the Brighton Main Line (via London Bridge) and the southern part of the Midland Main Line, plus a suburban true loop (circuit) serving Sutton. A branch via the Catford Loop Line to Sevenoaks was added in 2012. Sections to Peterborough on the East Coast Main Line, Cambridge via the Cambridge Line, Horsham on the Arun Valley line and Rainham via Greenwich were added in 2018. East Grinstead and Orpington are also served during peak hours.

The route through central London (today known as Thameslink core) is via St Pancras International for connections to Eurostar and the East Midlands; Farringdon, for London Underground Circle, Metropolitan and Hammersmith & City lines, and the Elizabeth line; City Thameslink, which replaced the demolished Holborn Viaduct station and has a southern entrance serving Ludgate Circus; Blackfriars, for main-line rail services and the Underground District and Circle lines; and London Bridge for main-line links into Kent and Sussex and the Underground Northern and Jubilee lines. King's Cross Thameslink on Pentonville Road closed on 8 December 2007.

Trains operating the "main line" service (Bedford and Cambridge to Brighton, Peterborough to Horsham) include first-class accommodation; those operating from Luton, St Albans and Kentish Town to Sutton, Sevenoaks and Orpington are usually standard class only. When Govia operated the original Thameslink franchise these services were designated "Thameslink CityFlier" and "Thameslink CityMetro" respectively, but First Capital Connect dropped this branding. Govia Thameslink Railway referred to these services as Route TL1 (formerly Route 6) and Route TL2/TL3 (formerly Route 7/8) respectively.

== Services ==
Logo used by the service operator

=== Off-peak ===
The Monday–Friday off-peak service pattern, with frequencies in trains per hour (tph), includes:

Thameslink Monday–Friday off-peak service pattern
Route	tph	Calling at
Bedford to Brighton	2	Flitwick; Harlington; Leagrave; Luton; Luton Airport Parkway; Harpenden; St Albans City; West Hampstead Thameslink; London St Pancras International; Farringdon; City Thameslink; London Blackfriars; London Bridge; East Croydon; Gatwick Airport; Three Bridges; Balcombe; Haywards Heath; Wivelsfield; Burgess Hill; Hassocks; Preston Park
Bedford to Three Bridges via Redhill	2	Flitwick; Harlington; Leagrave; Luton; Luton Airport Parkway; Harpenden; St Albans City; London St Pancras International; Farringdon; City Thameslink; London Blackfriars; London Bridge; Norwood Junction; East Croydon; South Croydon; Purley; Redhill; Earlswood; Salfords; Horley; Gatwick Airport; In the evening, this service only runs between Luton and Three Bridges
Peterborough to Horsham via Redhill	2	Huntingdon; St Neots; Sandy; Biggleswade; Arlesey; Hitchin; Stevenage; Finsbury Park; London St Pancras International; Farringdon; City Thameslink; London Blackfriars; London Bridge; East Croydon; Coulsdon South; Merstham; Redhill; Horley; Gatwick Airport; Three Bridges; Crawley; Ifield; Littlehaven
Cambridge to Brighton	2	Cambridge South; Royston; Ashwell & Morden; Baldock; Letchworth Garden City; Hitchin; Stevenage; Finsbury Park; London St Pancras International; Farringdon; City Thameslink; London Blackfriars; London Bridge; East Croydon; Gatwick Airport; Three Bridges; Haywards Heath; Burgess Hill
London Blackfriars to Sevenoaks via Catford and Otford	2	Elephant & Castle; Denmark Hill; Peckham Rye; Nunhead; Crofton Park; Catford; Bellingham; Beckenham Hill; Ravensbourne; Shortlands; Bromley South; Bickley; St Mary Cray; Swanley; Eynsford; Shoreham; Otford; Bat & Ball
Luton to Rainham via Greenwich	2	Luton Airport Parkway; Harpenden; St Albans City; Radlett; Elstree & Borehamwood; Mill Hill Broadway; Brent Cross West; West Hampstead Thameslink; London St Pancras International; Farringdon; City Thameslink; London Blackfriars; London Bridge; Deptford; Greenwich; Maze Hill; Westcombe Park; Charlton; Woolwich Arsenal; Plumstead; Abbey Wood; Slade Green; Dartford; Stone Crossing; Greenhithe; Swanscombe; Northfleet; Gravesend; Higham; Strood; Rochester; Chatham; Gillingham; In the evening, this service only runs between Kentish Town and Rainham
St Albans City to Sutton via Wimbledon (loop)	2	Radlett; Elstree & Borehamwood; Mill Hill Broadway; Hendon; Brent Cross West; Cricklewood; West Hampstead Thameslink; Kentish Town; London St Pancras International; Farringdon; City Thameslink; London Blackfriars; Elephant & Castle; Loughborough Junction; Herne Hill; Tulse Hill; Streatham; Tooting; Haydons Road; Wimbledon; Wimbledon Chase; South Merton; Morden South; St Helier; Sutton Common; West Sutton; Services then continue to/from St Albans City via Mitcham Junction (see below)
St Albans City to Sutton via Mitcham Junction (loop)	2	Radlett; Elstree & Borehamwood; Mill Hill Broadway; Hendon; Brent Cross West; Cricklewood; West Hampstead Thameslink; Kentish Town; London St Pancras International; Farringdon; City Thameslink; London Blackfriars; Elephant & Castle; Loughborough Junction; Herne Hill; Tulse Hill; Streatham; Mitcham Eastfields; Mitcham Junction; Hackbridge; Carshalton; Services then continue to/from St Albans City via Wimbledon (see above)

=== Peak hours ===
During peak hours, the two trains per hour London Blackfriars to Sevenoaks service (from the table above) is extended through the 'core section' to/from Welwyn Garden City (though a few services originate at Finsbury Park), with extra calls at City Thameslink, Farringdon, St Pancras International, Finsbury Park, New Southgate, Oakleigh Park, New Barnet, Potters Bar and Hatfield.

During peak hours, several extra trains in each direction (approximately two trains per hour) run to/from Orpington (originating/terminating at either London Blackfriars, Luton, West Hampstead Thameslink or Kentish Town), all calling at Petts Wood in lieu of stations from St Mary Cray to Bat & Ball.

Seven trains per day in each direction operate to/from East Grinstead (originating/terminating at either Bedford, West Hampstead Thameslink, St Pancras International or London Bridge), which, after calling at South Croydon, call at Sanderstead, Riddlesdown, Upper Warlingham, Woldingham, Oxted, Hurst Green, Lingfield and Dormans.

During peak hours, Peterborough to Horsham services call at Faygate between Ifield and Littlehaven, providing the primary service to this station.

During the morning peak hours only, southbound Peterborough to Horsham services call at Knebworth.

Three extra trains throughout the evening peak hours operate from Gatwick Airport to Bedford in that direction only, calling at various stations.

== History ==
=== Conceptual origins and post-war planning (1941–1970s) ===
The strategic concept for a north–south through-running railway in London has deep historical roots, predating the Thameslink name by decades. Passenger services operated across London through the Snow Hill tunnel from mid-Victorian times until World War I, when services were withdrawn as inner-London traffic shifted to buses and trams.

On 14 June 1941, railway manager George Dow proposed in an article in The Star a series of electrified, underground main-line routes to interconnect London's termini, arguing that "London suburban lines cannot play their full part... until they have been interconnected across London and electrified". This vision was further developed in the post-war County of London Plan (1943) and Greater London Plan (1944). A 1949 working party identified a high-priority "Route A" that closely resembled the future Thameslink, designed to integrate suburban services and relieve Underground congestion. These ambitious plans were shelved due to post-war austerity, and the Snow Hill Tunnel route remained open only for cross-London freight trains until 1970.

Overhead electrification, completed in 1982, allowed the northern section to run as the Midland City Line from Bedford via the Midland Main Line to St Pancras, and via the City Widened Lines to Moorgate. (Note: This service was colloquially known as the Bedpan Line from the contracted names of the terminal stations, as had happened with the Bakerloo line. In general limited-stop trains served St Pancras, and all-stations trains Moorgate.)

=== "Snow Hill Link": a pragmatic revival (1980s) ===
The concept was revived in the early 1980s as a pragmatic, low-cost project, driven by the new Network SouthEast (NSE) sector of British Rail. Established in 1986 under director Chris Green, NSE moved away from a geographically based management structure towards a business-led approach focused on customer markets and reducing public subsidy. The reactivation of the disused Snow Hill Tunnel was identified by NSE as a key project that could better utilise existing assets and create new travel opportunities. A 1984 feasibility study commissioned by the Greater London Council (GLC) had found that the tunnel could be reopened for as little as £7–12 million.

The project faced significant institutional resistance. London Transport initially blocked the Parliamentary legislation required for the project, officially due to a dispute over land at Farringdon, but with the "suspicion... that it fears extra competition." An editorial at the time called for the Transport Secretary to "bang BR and LT heads together to get this scheme on the rails as fast as possible." Ultimately, the project received government approval with the passage of the British Rail Bill in 1986, which provided for the reopening and electrification of the tunnel to link the Midland and Southern Regions.

=== 1988 launch and initial impact ===
The Snow Hill tunnel was re-opened by British Rail to passenger trains after 72 years, with the first Thameslink services beginning in May 1988. Marketed as a solution to the "dodge-the-chaos" strain of changing trains in central London, the service was an immediate success. Passenger demand quickly quadrupled initial projections, leading to severe overcrowding by 1998. The new link also had a significant economic impact, with one contemporary report noting it led to a "home price boom" in areas north of London like St Albans.

On 29 January 1990, the section between Blackfriars and Farringdon was temporarily closed to permit the construction of a new alignment. The route through the site of the long-closed Ludgate Hill station, over Ludgate Hill to Holborn Viaduct was abandoned and demolished. The replacement route under Ludgate Hill was opened on 29 May 1990 by the Network SouthEast (sector of British Rail) concurrently with City Thameslink station, which was initially called St Paul's Thameslink but was renamed in 1991 to avoid confusion with St. Paul's Underground station, about 500 m (550 yd) away.

King's Cross Thameslink on Pentonville Road closed on 8 December 2007, when the Thameslink platforms at nearby St Pancras opened.

=== Service evolution ===
In the south the services divide: many main-line trains run almost due south through London Bridge to East Croydon and many continue to Brighton, but the other routes and branches evolved, as follows:

- From 1988 to 1991 such trains went variously
  - via Bromley: to Orpington or to Sevenoaks, (both since resumed) or;
  - via Herne Hill and East Croydon to Purley (off peak only).
- From 1991 to 1994, such trains went only via Elephant & Castle and Streatham to West Croydon, Wallington, Sutton, Epsom, Leatherhead and Effingham Junction, to Guildford.
- From 1994 to 1995 such trains terminated at West Croydon (cutting franchise zone-crossing due to rail privatisation).
  - From the latter year such trains have run "to and from" a nominal furthest point of a true circular loop, Sutton, the Sutton loop calling at stations including Mitcham Junction, Streatham and Wimbledon.
- From 2018 the service was greatly recast and expanded following the completion of the Thameslink programme:
  - A regular service to Rainham has been added.
  - A regular service to Horsham has been added.
  - In the north the present termini of the trains are Luton, Bedford, Cambridge, Peterborough, St Albans and in peak hours, Welwyn Garden City.

=== Franchise operators ===
As of the early 1990s privatisation of British Rail, Thameslink was franchised to Thameslink, a subsidiary of Govia.

By late 1998, more than 28,000 passengers were carried at morning peak times.

From 1 April 2006, the franchise was taken over by First Capital Connect along with some services that had been operated by WAGN. The branding of most trains, stations, and signs was changed to match the name of the new company, but City Thameslink and West Hampstead Thameslink were not renamed as Thameslink referred to the route. (Note: King's Cross Thameslink kept the Thameslink suffix until it closed on 8 December 2007.) After criticism of the loss of the apt name for this group of routes, First Capital Connect's publicity began calling this set of services its "Thameslink route" to distinguish it from the former WAGN services.

On 14 September 2014, Govia Thameslink Railway took over operations from First Capital Connect.

== Thameslink Programme ==
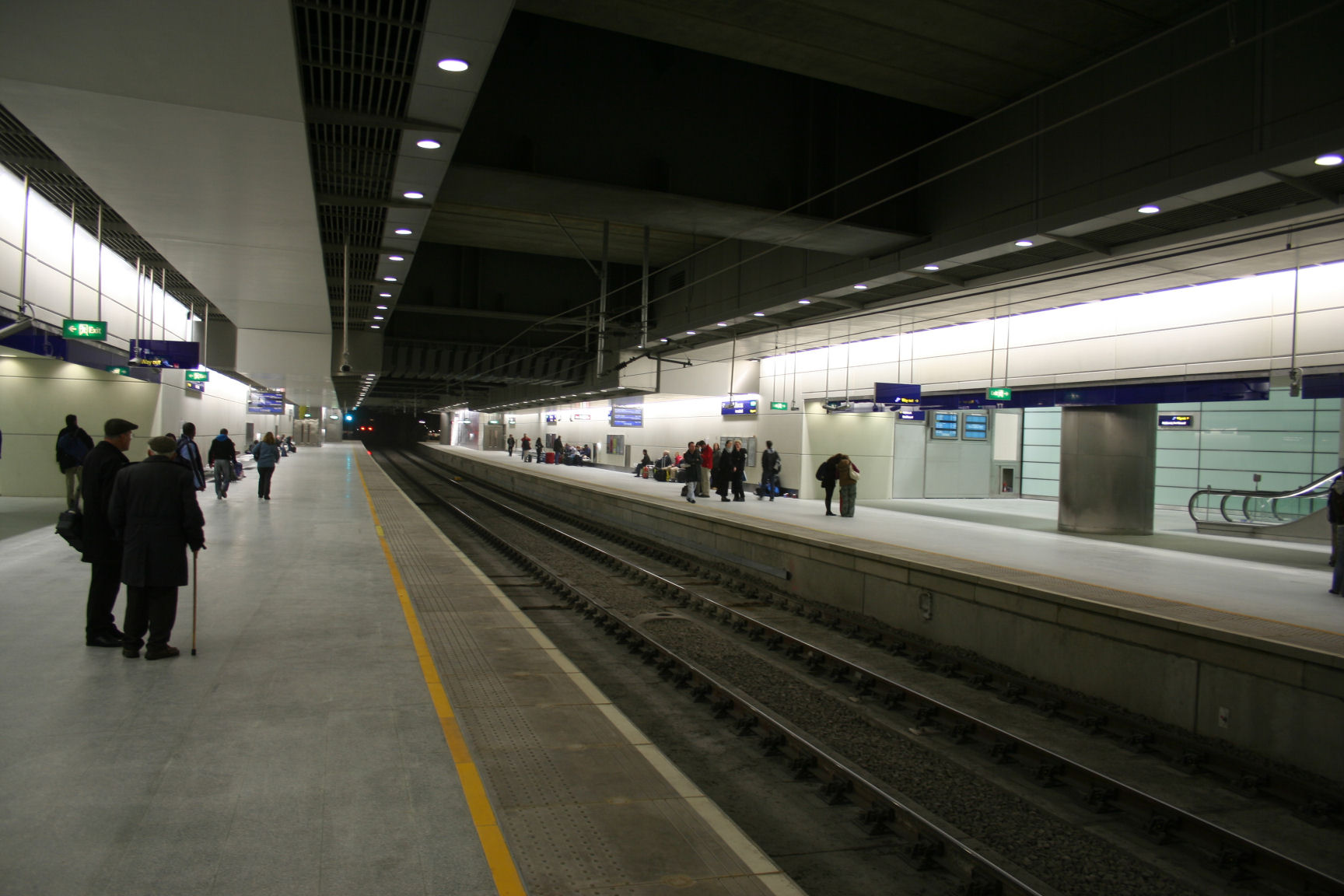
St Pancras International Thameslink platforms opened in 2007

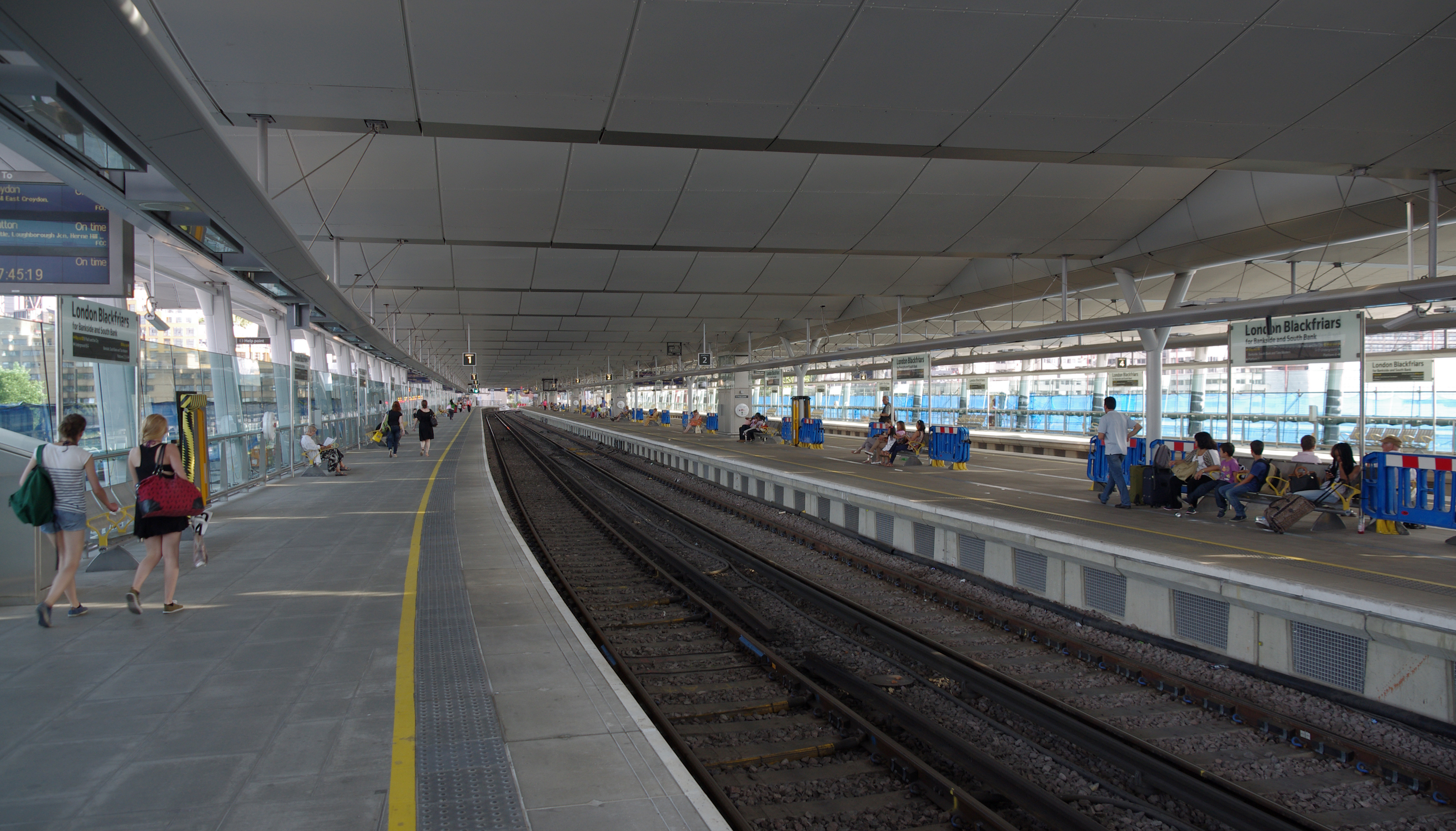
Blackfriars new cross-river platforms

The Thameslink Programme was a major £7 billion infrastructure project designed to address the severe overcrowding that had developed on the original 1988 route. The programme comprised infrastructure works totalling £5.5 billion (2017 prices) and new rolling stock with lease costs of £1.7 billion.

Network Rail obtained planning permission and legal powers in 2006, funding was secured in July 2007 and construction began in October 2007.

The infrastructure budget increased by £474 million (9.4%) from the original 2012 budget, primarily due to unforeseen complexities at London Bridge station. London Bridge station's long history of development and bomb damage during World War Two meant that much of the site was inadequately documented, requiring design changes and accelerated works to maintain the project schedule.

Plans included rebuilding the station buildings at Farringdon (in conjunction with the Crossrail project) and West Hampstead Thameslink, total rebuild of London Bridge and Blackfriars stations, two new underground platforms at St Pancras International, a new tunnel north of St Pancras International to the East Coast Main Line to allow through services to Peterborough and Cambridge, and platform lengthening. A new 8- and 12-carriage fleet of Class 700 trains began in 2016. The new services on to the Great Northern route began initially on 8 March 2018, with the full timetable introduced in December 2019, one year later than originally planned to manage risks associated with introducing the complex service changes.

The programme also identified the need for an additional £900 million of maintenance and renewals work to ensure the wider rail network could reliably support the new high-frequency services, though initial funding covered only £300 million of this work.

The London and South East Route Utilisation Strategy published in July 2011 laid out a provisional 24 trains per hour timetable. South of London it would provide four trains to Brighton (one semi-fast, one stopping) and two each to Three Bridges, Horsham, East Grinstead, Caterham, Tattenham Corner, Tunbridge Wells, Ashford International, Maidstone East, Sevenoaks and Bellingham. North of London there would be eight semi-fast trains to Bedford, four stopping trains to St Albans, two stopping and two semi-fast trains to Luton, two semi-fast trains to Peterborough, two semi-fast trains to Cambridge and four stopping trains to Welwyn Garden City.

Below is a provisional timetable solely for services running through the 'Thameslink core' tunnel. This 'provisional timetable' was proposed before the upgrade and has not yet been achieved. See Services section above for the current service pattern.

Regional Routes
No.	Northern terminus		Central London	Southern terminus		Length	Times (core)
1	Bedford	semi-fast	via London Bridge	Brighton	fast	12-car	All day
2	Bedford	semi-fast	via London Bridge	Brighton	fast	12-car	All day
3	Bedford	semi-fast	via London Bridge	Gatwick Airport (via Redhill)	semi-fast	12-car	All day
4	Bedford	semi-fast	via London Bridge	Gatwick Airport (via Redhill)	semi-fast	12-car	All day
5	Peterborough	semi-fast	via London Bridge	Horsham (via Redhill)	semi-fast	12-car	All day (Note: Hourly on Sundays.)
6	Peterborough	semi-fast	via London Bridge	Horsham (via Redhill)	semi-fast	12-car	All day
7	Cambridge	semi-fast	via London Bridge	Brighton	fast	12-car	All day
8	Cambridge	semi-fast	via London Bridge	Brighton	fast	12-car	All day
9	Cambridge	stopping	via London Bridge	Ashford International (peak only); Maidstone East (off-peak)	semi-fast	8-car	All day (Note: On Sundays, service will run hourly between Cambridge and Kings Cross only; it will not run through the core section or on to Maidstone.)
10	Cambridge	stopping	via London Bridge	Ashford International (peak only); Maidstone East (off-peak)	semi-fast	8-car	All day
11	Bedford	fast	via London Bridge	East Grinstead	stopping	12-car	Peak only
12	Bedford	fast	via London Bridge	East Grinstead	stopping	12-car	Peak only
13	Bedford	fast	via London Bridge	Littlehampton (via Hove)	fast	12-car	Peak only
14	Bedford	fast	via London Bridge	Littlehampton (via Hove)	fast	12-car	Peak only
Commuter Routes
No.	Northern terminus		Central London	Southern terminus		Length	Times
15	Luton	all stations (Note: Except for Kentish Town, Cricklewood and Hendon.)	via London Bridge	Rainham (via Greenwich)	all stations (Note: Except for Woolwich Dockyard, Belvedere and Erith.)	8-car	All day
16	Luton	all stations	via London Bridge	Rainham (via Greenwich)	all stations	8-car	All day
17	St Albans City	all stations	via Elephant & Castle	Sutton (via Mitcham Junction)	all stations	8-car	All day
18	St Albans City	all stations	via Elephant & Castle	Sutton (via Mitcham Junction)	all stations	8-car	All day
19	St Albans City	all stations	via Elephant & Castle	Sutton (via Wimbledon)	all stations	8-car	All day
20	St Albans City	all stations	via Elephant & Castle	Sutton (via Wimbledon)	all stations	8-car	All day
21	Luton (peak only); Kentish Town (off-peak)	all stations	via Elephant & Castle	Orpington (via Catford)	all stations	8-car	All day (Note: No service on Sundays.)
22	Luton (peak only); Kentish Town (off-peak)	all stations	via Elephant & Castle	Orpington (via Catford)	all stations	8-car	All day
23	Welwyn Garden City (peak only); London Blackfriars (off-peak)	stopping	via Elephant & Castle	Sevenoaks (via Catford and Otford)	all stations	8-car	All day (Note: An all-day service will operate between London Blackfriars and Sevenoaks only, with no service through the core outside of peak hours.)
24	Welwyn Garden City (peak only); London Blackfriars (off-peak)	stopping	via Elephant & Castle	Sevenoaks (via Catford and Otford)	all stations	8-car	All day

== Rolling stock ==
All rolling stock used on Thameslink is electrically powered dual-voltage units using 25 kV AC overhead power north of Farringdon and 750 V DC third rail to the south.

=== Current fleet ===
==== Class 700 ====
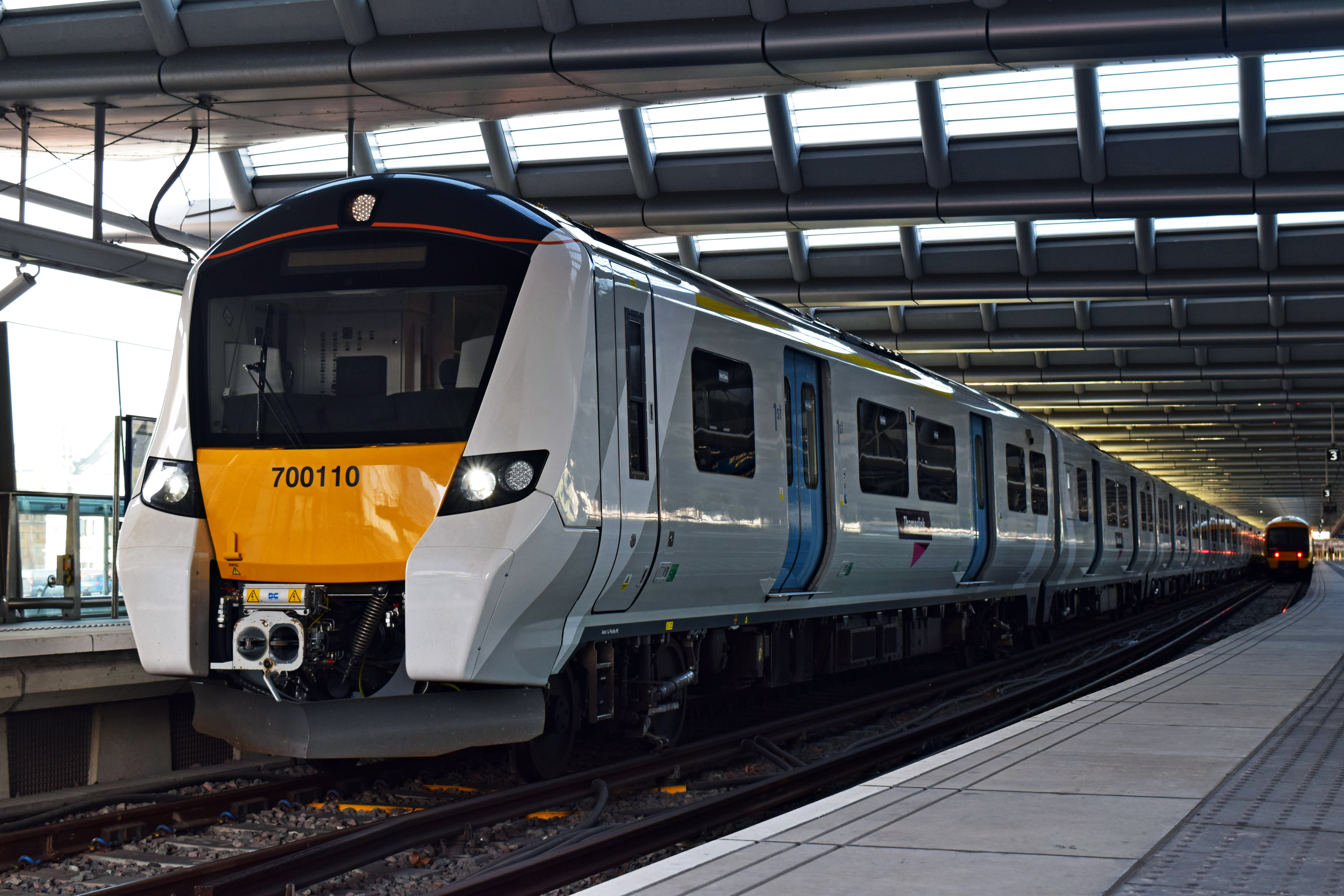
Class 700 at Blackfriars

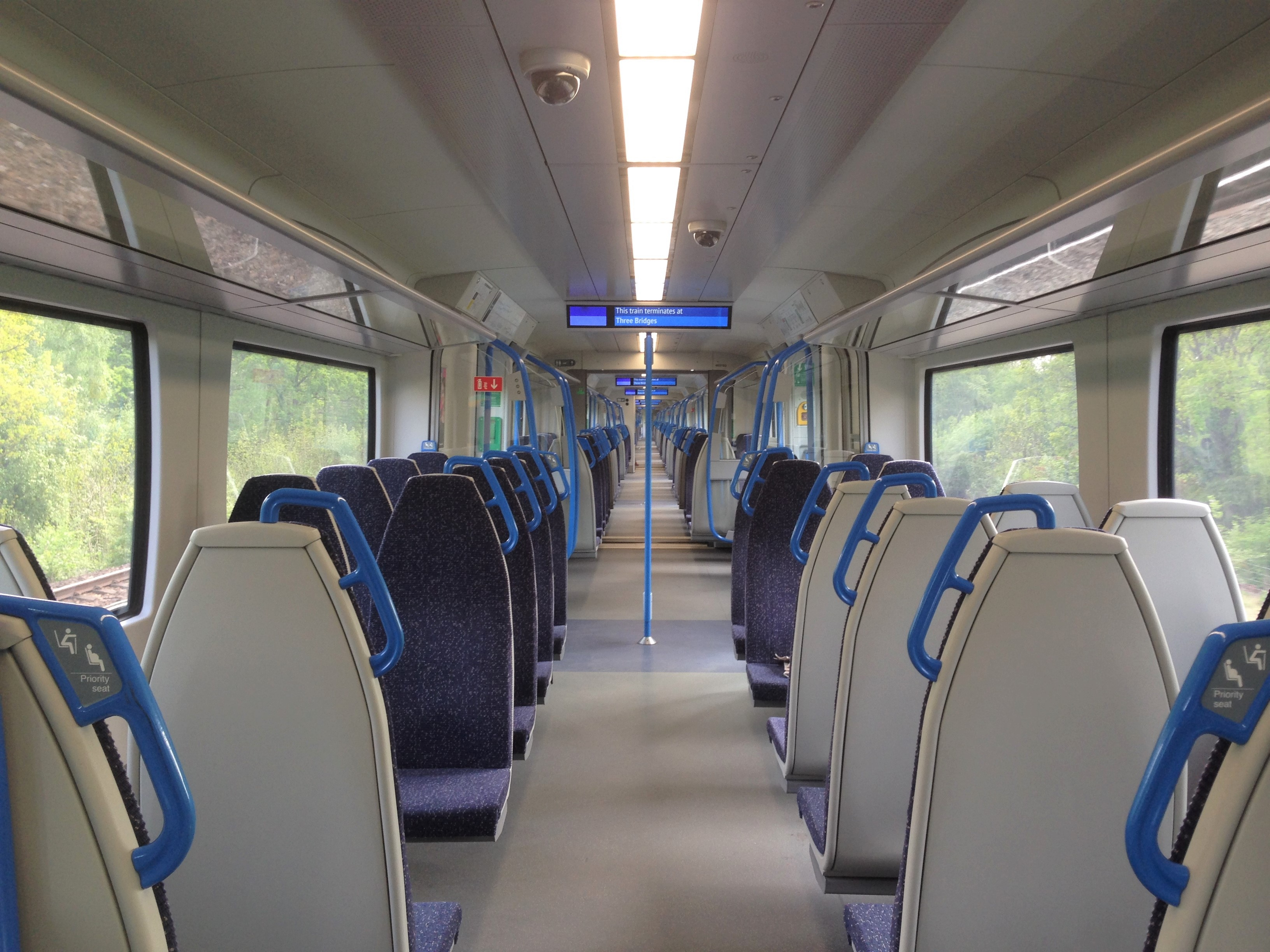
Interior of the Thameslink Class 700 trains

Class 700 trains were delivered between 2015 and 2018, providing an additional 14,500 seats. Siemens Mobility was named preferred bidder on 16 June 2011, with the Desiro City train family. The contract was signed in June 2013 for 1,140 carriages, with 55 twelve-car and 60 eight-car trains. The depots are at Hornsey and Three Bridges. The Three Bridges depot opened in October 2015 and the first trains entered service in spring 2016. All units are now in service, having replaced the Class 319 and Class 387 fleets.

Family	Class	Image	Type	Top speed		Number	Carriages	Routes operated	Built
Family	Class	Image	Type	mph	km/h	Number	Carriages	Routes operated	Built
Siemens Desiro	700 Desiro City		EMU	100	161	60	8	Entire Thameslink network	2015–2018
Siemens Desiro	700 Desiro City		EMU	100	161	55	12	Entire Thameslink network	2015–2018

=== Past fleet ===
==== Class 319 ====
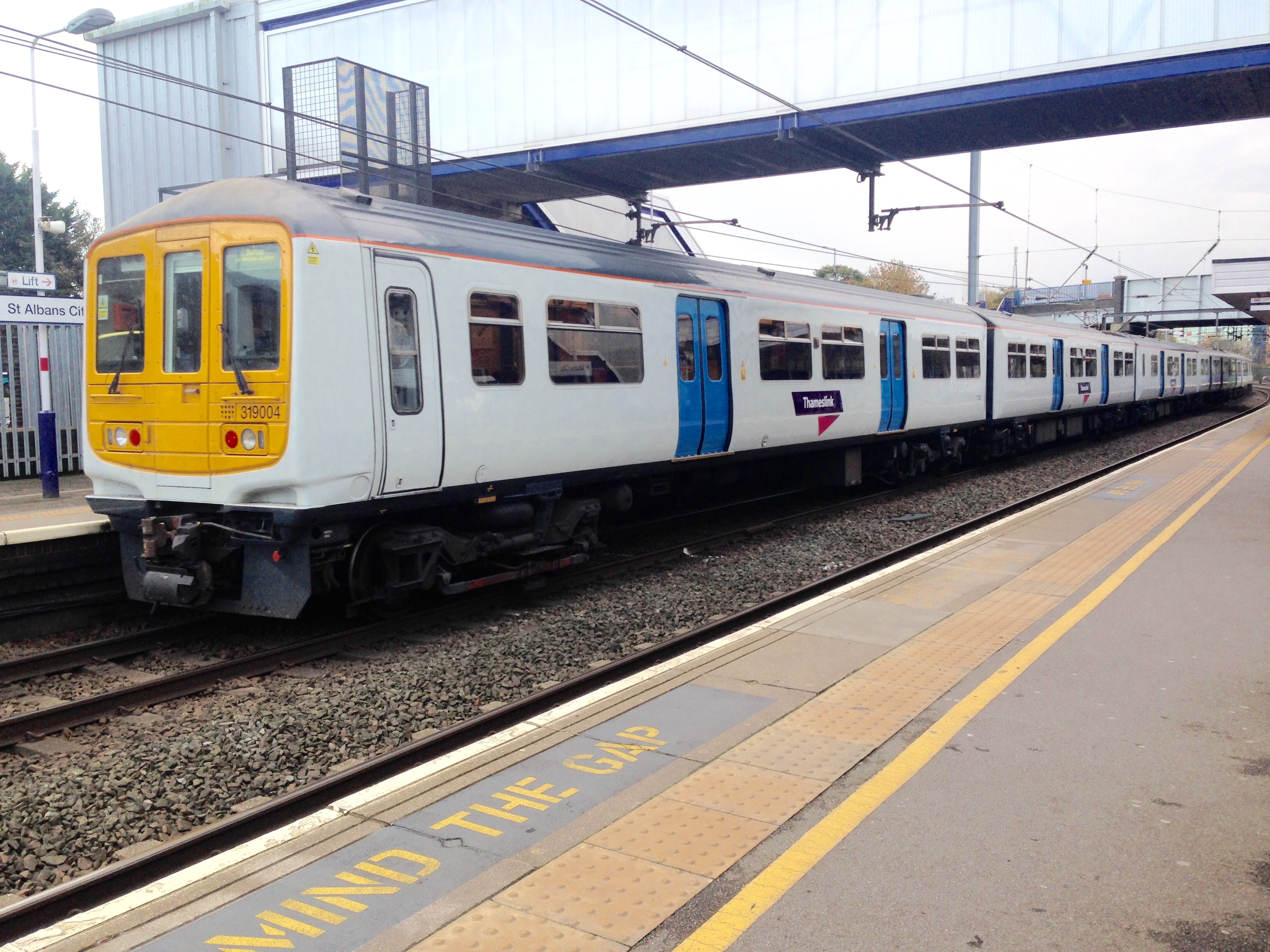
Class 319 at St Albans

The first rolling stock used on Thameslink were the 86 Class 319 trains built between 1987 and 1990. These are electrically powered dual-voltage four-car units rated to carry 289, 308 or 319 passengers. Four Class 319 trains had been transferred from Southern in December 2008 and the last four followed in March 2009, from which point they were all on Thameslink. The last was withdrawn in August 2017.

==== Class 377 ====
First Capital Connect acquired 23 four-coach Class 377 sets during 2009 on sublease from Southern, for the Thameslink route for additional capacity and to allow some of the Class 319 trains to be released for the Catford Loop service to Sevenoaks, now jointly operated with Southeastern under Key Output 0 of the Thameslink Programme.

==== Class 317 ====
Class 317 units built in the early 1980s were still in use when services into Moorgate ceased in March 2009: the last timetabled service ran from Farringdon to Bedford on 9 October 2009.

==== Class 387 ====
Due to delays in the new Class 700 fleet, the DfT and Southern ordered 116 electric dual-voltage 110 mph (180 km/h) carriages (29 trains) with the option for another 140 carriages (35 trains). The tender for the new Class 387 trains was won by Bombardier and the first set entered service in December 2014, with all in service by May 2015. By 2018, all units were replaced by the new Class 700 fleet with the Class 387 fleet moving over to the Great Northern brand.

== 2014 franchise ==
The invitation to tender for the Thameslink, Southern and Great Northern franchise was expected to be issued in October 2012, with the contract commencing in September 2013. In March 2012, the Department for Transport announced Abellio, FirstGroup, Govia, MTR Corporation and Stagecoach Group had pre-qualified to bid for the franchise.

Due to problems with the InterCity West Coast tendering process, the process was delayed, with the new franchise delayed until September 2014. The new franchise includes the South Central franchise currently operated by Southern and certain routes from the Integrated Kent Franchise currently operated by Southeastern.

In May 2014, it was announced that the franchise has been awarded to Govia Thameslink Railway. The new Thameslink Southern & Great Northern franchise will include both the Thameslink Great Northern and South Central franchises.

Govia Thameslink Railway began operations on 14 September 2014, with the former First Capital Connect routes Thameslink and Great Northern.

== Thameslink 2 ==
Railfuture, an organisation campaigning for better rail services for passengers and freight, has proposed an additional north–south route, connecting the Brighton Main Line to routes north of London, via East Croydon, Lewisham, Canary Wharf, and Stratford.

== See also ==
- Crossrail – project to build the east–west Elizabeth line route through London
- West London line – the north west–south route carrying the London Overground's Mildmay line
- Réseau Express Régional (RER) – the similar cross city rail network in Paris
- Cross-City Line – a similar north–south route across Birmingham
- Rail transport in Great Britain
