= Southend, London =

Coordinates: 51.4311°N 0.0245°W

Southend
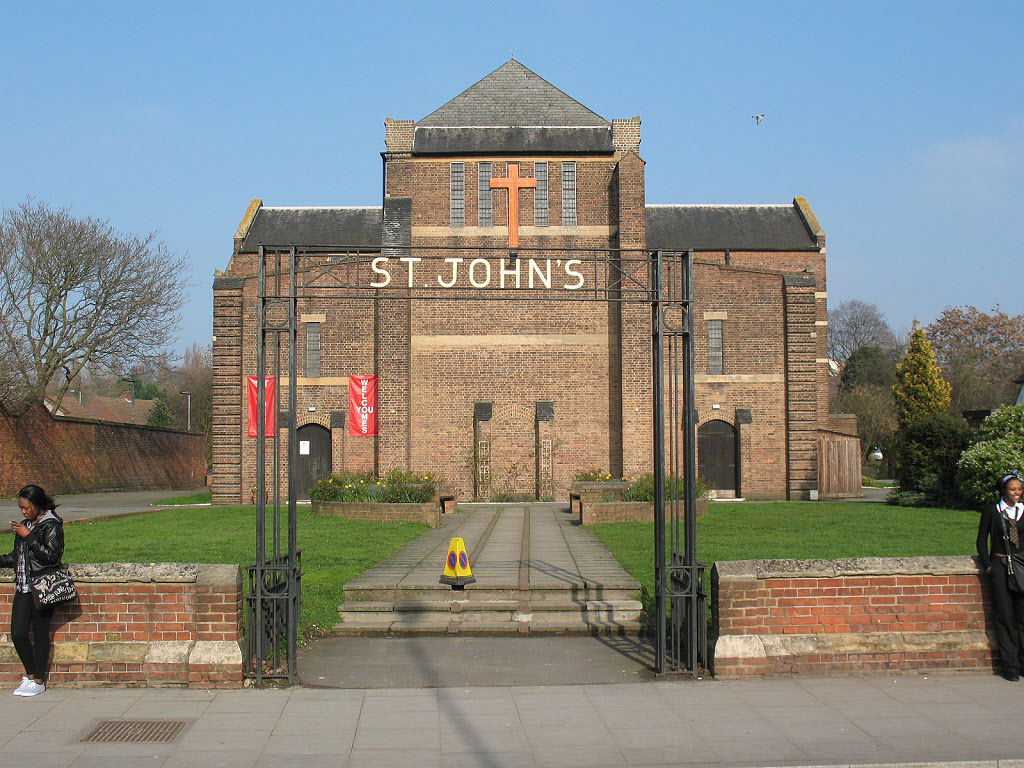
- St John the Baptist Church, Bromley Road, Southend

- Location within Greater London
- OS grid reference: TQ373721
- London borough: Lewisham
- Ceremonial county: Greater London
- Region: London
- Country: England
- Sovereign state: United Kingdom
- Post town: LONDON
- Postcode district: SE6
- Dialling code: 020
- Police: Metropolitan
- Fire: London
- Ambulance: London
- UK Parliament: Lewisham East
- London Assembly: Greenwich and Lewisham

Southend is a small residential locality in the London Borough of Lewisham in southeast London, England. It was historically a rural village at the south of the parish of Lewisham, Kent that remained undeveloped until after the First World War. It is now a residential suburb, with some large retail stores, within the built-up area of London.

== History ==
The name is derived from 'the south end of the parish of Lewisham'.

Southend, Lewisham became part of the Lewisham District in the metropolitan area of London in 1855. However, the village of Southend was separated from the urban development in the north by a swathe of farmland.

Local gentry previously inhabited large houses in Southend, including Flower House, Park House and Southend Hall. Southend was also once home to two corn mills, one of which was later used to manufacture cutlery in the 18th century. A Homebase store now stands behind the old mill pond on Bromley Road. From the 17th century Southend was home to at least three pubs, two of which survived into the 21st century: The Tiger's Head and The Green Man. The former site of the Tiger's Head has since been redeveloped as flats, and The Green Man site is now home to an events centre by the same name. A pub called the Kings Arms had also existed in Southend until 1858.

The railway arrived in the late 19th century with the opening of stations at nearby Bellingham and Beckenham Hill in 1892. From 1914 a tramway connected Catford to Southend, terminating at The Green Man pub. The area grew rapidly after the First World War and farmland was sold off for the development of housing, bringing Southend into the orbit of suburban London. In 1949 the Flower House Estate, built by the London County Council, was opened by Herbert Morrison. Other notable post-war developments include the eight-storey Nayland House on Bromley Road. In recent years the area has seen a decline in activity with the closure of both pubs, and the demolition of the former Splendid Cinema at the corner of Bromley Road and Whitefoot Lane.

Little remains of the former hamlet of Southend, which was mostly cleared away by urban development in the 20th century. A notable survivor of the 20th century redevelopment is St John's Church Hall, built in 1824 as a Chapel of Ease to St Mary's Church in Lewisham. The hall, along with St John's Church which dates to 1926–7, are Grade II listed buildings. A parish building to the east of the Church dates to the late 18th century.

== Geography ==
Bordering Bellingham, Downham, Sydenham and Beckenham, the area isn't often called Southend, more commonly being known as a part of Bellingham. The area is also part of the SE6 postcode district associated with Catford.

== Transport ==
Two railway stations: Beckenham Hill and Lower Sydenham are nearby. Both stations are served by Southeastern. For London Buses, routes 181 and 352 serve the area.

== Gallery ==
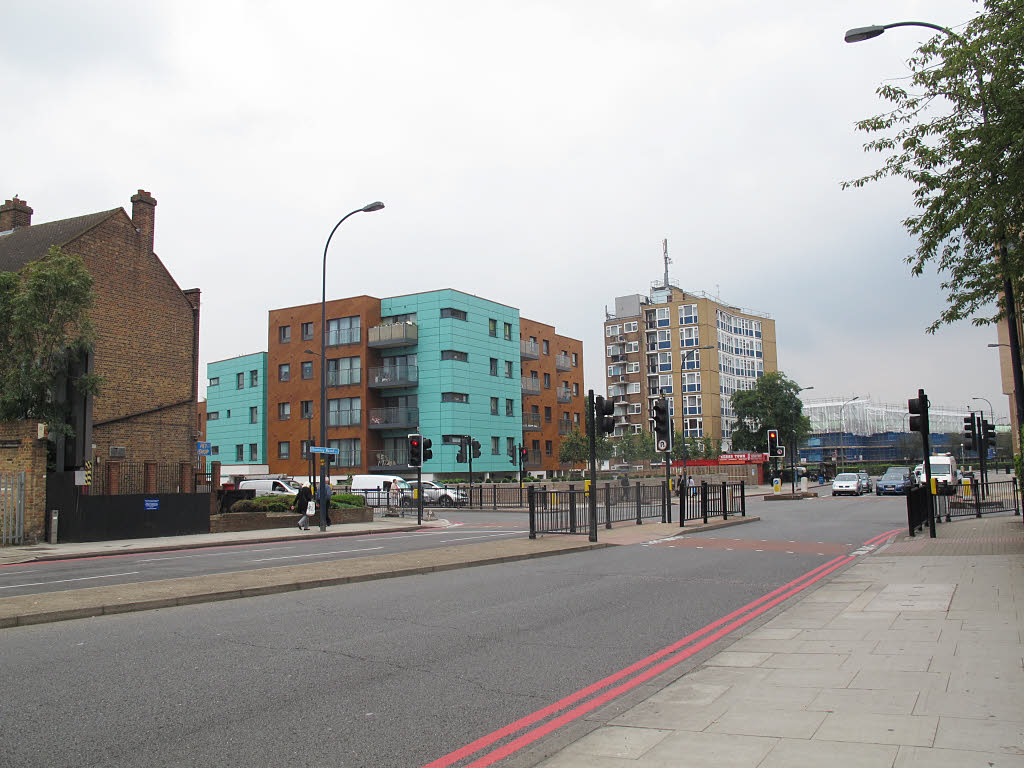
Junction of Southend Lane and Bromley Road. The flats in the foreground are on the former site of The Tiger's Head pub

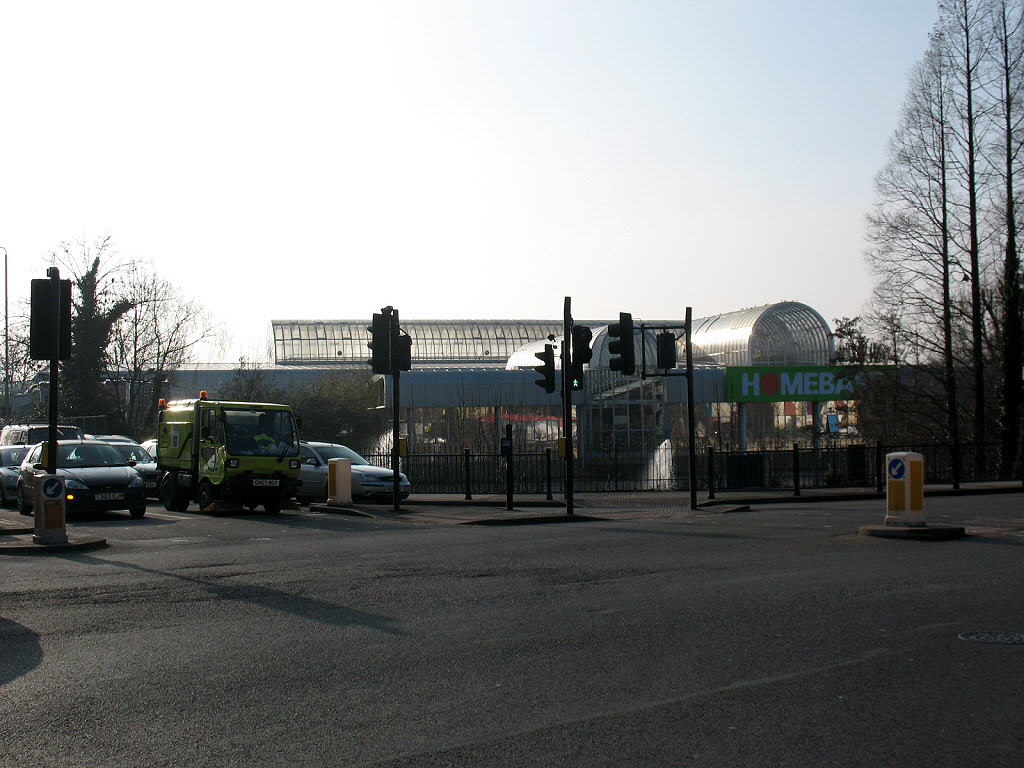
Homebase store behind the old mill pond

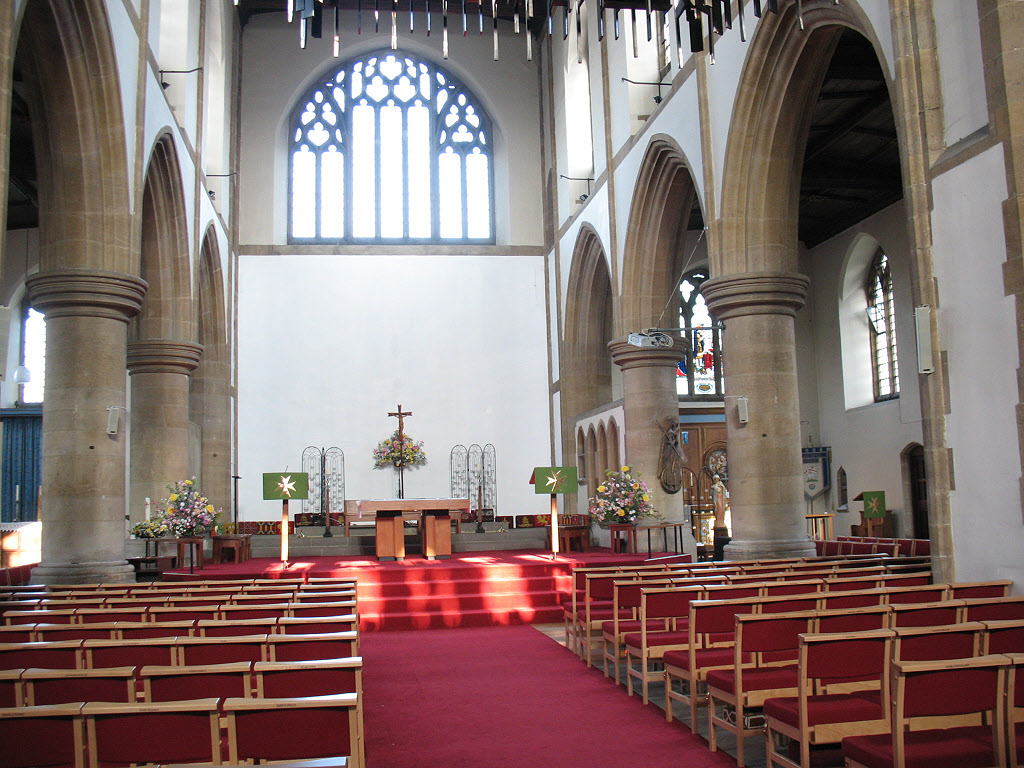
Interior of St John's Church

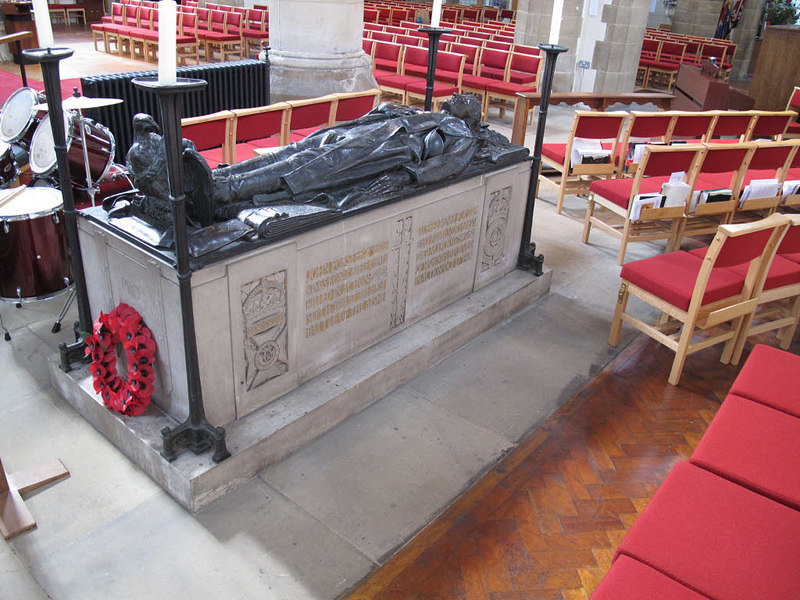
Forster Monument inside St John's Church

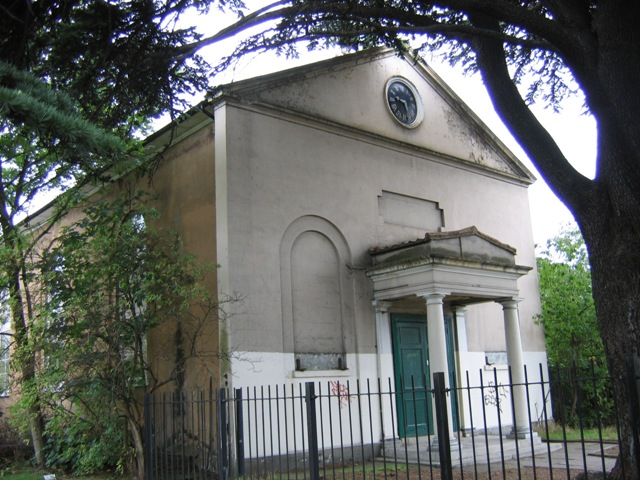
St John's Hall, Bromley Road
