= Bromley South railway station =

National Rail station in London, England

Bromley South
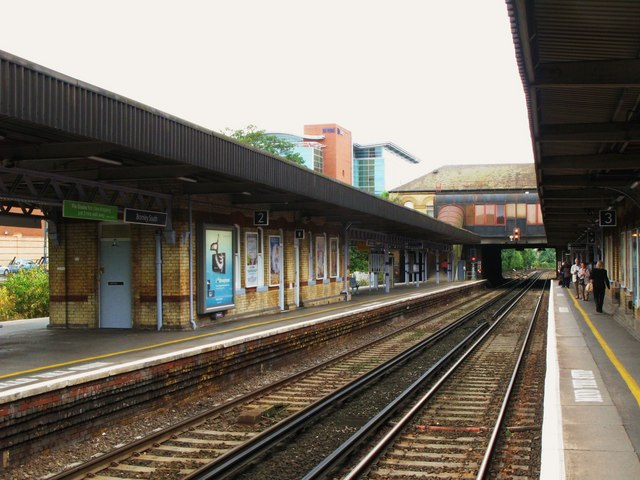
- Interactive map of Bromley South

General information
- Location: Bromley
- Local authority: London Borough of Bromley
- Managed by: Southeastern
- Station code: BMS
- DfT category: B
- Number of platforms: 4
- Accessible: Yes
- Fare zone: 5
- OSI: Bromley North

National Rail annual entry and exit
- 2020–21: ▼2.025 million
- Interchange: ▼0.246 million
- 2021–22: ▲4.599 million
- Interchange: ▲0.570 million
- 2022–23: ▲5.543 million
- Interchange: ▲0.764 million
- 2023–24: ▲5.985 million
- Interchange: ▲0.853 million
- 2024–25: ▲6.194 million
- Interchange: ▲0.976 million

Key dates
- 5 July 1858: Opened as Bromley
- 1 June 1899: Renamed Bromley South

Other information
- External links: Departures; Facilities
- Coordinates: 51.4°N 0.017°E

Bromley South railway station is on the Chatham Main Line, serving the town centre and high street of Bromley, south-east London, England. It is 10 miles 71 chains (17.5 km) down the line from London Victoria and is situated between Shortlands and Bickley. The station and most trains that serve it are operated by Southeastern, with some services also operated by Thameslink. It is in London fare zone 5. It is one of two stations in the town, the other being Bromley North.

== History ==
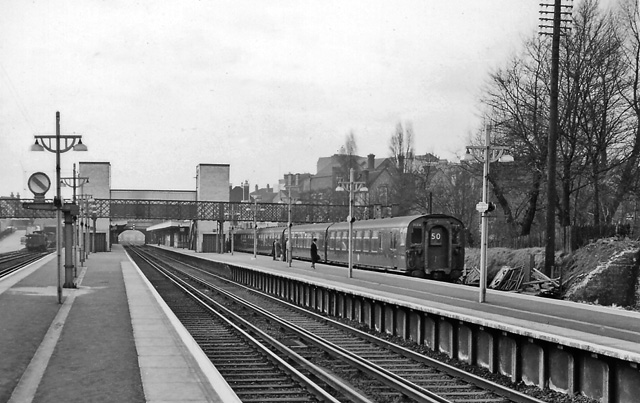
Bromley South in 1961

The station, initially consisting of two platforms, was opened on 5 July 1858 by the London, Chatham and Dover Railway. It was originally opened as just 'Bromley', with the 'South' suffix added from 1 June 1899 to distinguish it from Bromley North.

The line through the station was quadrupled in 1893, and the overbridge was constructed in the same year.

Lifts were installed at the station in 2012, funded by the Department for Transport's Access for All scheme. Work started in 2011 and also included refurbishing the toilets and entrance hall.

== Facilities ==
The station is well equipped to serve its large number of passengers, with a ticket office and ticket machines, telephones, accessible toilets, shops and vending machines, help points and cycle storage.

== Passenger volume ==
Passenger volume at Bromley South
	2004–05	2005–06	2006–07	2007–08	2008–09	2009–10	2010–11	2011–12	2012–13	2013–14	2014–15	2015–16	2016–17	2017–18	2018–19	2019–20	2020–21	2021–22	2022–23	2023–24	2024–25
Entries and exits	4,573,542	4,474,726	5,735,906	6,048,342	5,796,166	5,537,642	5,763,662	5,867,108	6,013,790	6,869,016	7,381,458	8,317,456	8,532,022	8,551,676	8,368,348	7,973,572	2,024,926	4,599,346	5,543,296	5,984,728	6,193,798
Interchanges	445,115	473,735	579,545	885,192	830,504	704,493	604,130	706,866	730,651	783,436	866,877	1,032,525	1,001,461	1,050,008	1,144,938	1,116,048	246,302	570,103	764,420	852,825	975,612

The statistics cover twelve month periods that start in April.

== Services ==
Services at Bromley South are operated by Southeastern and Thameslink using Class 375, 377, 465, 466 and 700 EMUs.

The typical off-peak service in trains per hour is:

- 8 tph to London Victoria (3 of these run non-stop, 1 calls at Denmark Hill only and 4 call at all stations via Herne Hill)
- 2 tph to London Blackfriars via Catford
- 4 tph to Orpington
- 2 tph to Sevenoaks
- 1 tph to Gillingham
- 1 tph to Ashford International via Maidstone East
- 1 tph to Ramsgate
- 1 tph to Dover Priory via Canterbury East

During the peak hours, additional services including trains between Orpington, Kentish Town and Luton call at the station. In addition, the service to London Blackfriars is extended to and from Welwyn Garden City via Finsbury Park.

Preceding station	National Rail	Following station
Denmark Hill or London Victoria	Southeastern Chatham Main Line	St Mary Cray or Longfield or Rochester
Denmark Hill or London Victoria	Southeastern Kent Downs line	St Mary Cray or Longfield or Rochester
Shortlands	Southeastern Bromley South Line	Bickley
Shortlands	Thameslink Catford loop line	Bickley

== Connections ==
London Buses routes 61, 119, 138, 146, 162, 208, 246, 261, 314, 320, 336, 352, 358, 367, SL5 and night routes N3 and N199 serve the station.

== See also ==
- Bromley North railway station, a smaller station a short walk away.

== Bibliography ==
- Quick, Michael (2023). Railway Passenger Stations in Great Britain: A Chronology (PDF) (5th ed.). London: Railway and Canal Historical Society.
