= Shortlands railway station =

National Rail station in London, England

Shortlands
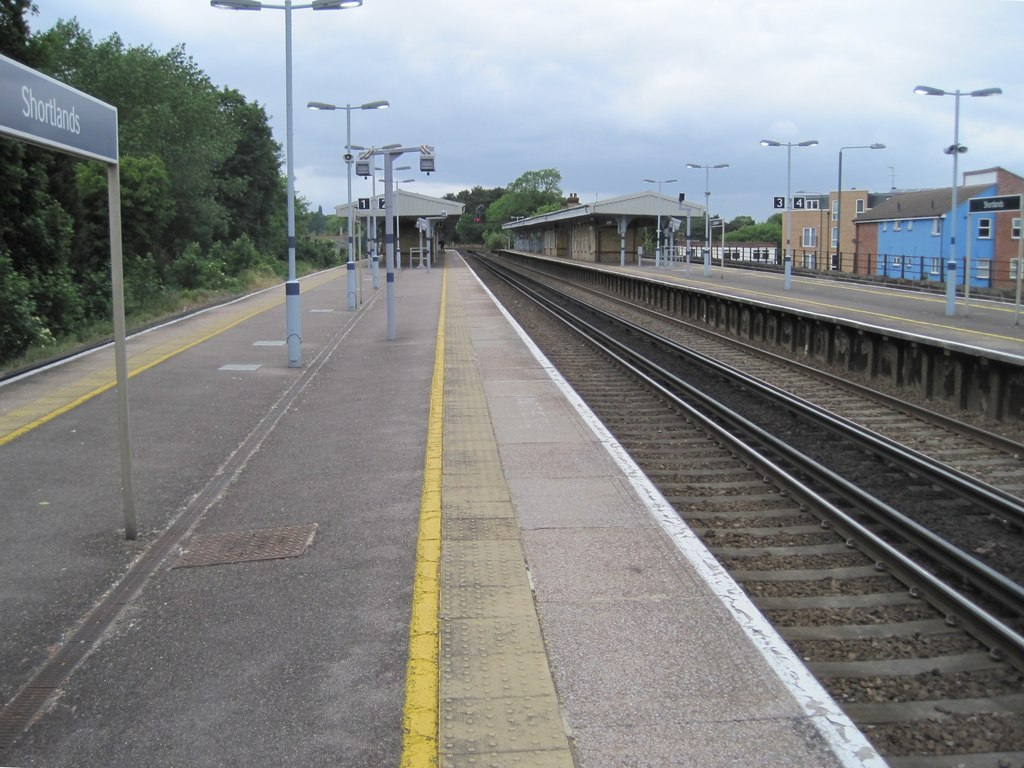
- Interactive map of Shortlands

General information
- Location: Shortlands
- Local authority: London Borough of Bromley
- Managed by: Southeastern
- Station code: SRT
- DfT category: D
- Number of platforms: 4
- Fare zone: 4

National Rail annual entry and exit
- 2020–21: ▼0.338 million
- Interchange: ▼5,315
- 2021–22: ▲0.761 million
- Interchange: ▲11,101
- 2022–23: ▲0.935 million
- Interchange: ▼9,925
- 2023–24: ▲1.073 million
- Interchange: ▲11,856
- 2024–25: ▲1.129 million
- Interchange: ▼7,369

Key dates
- 3 May 1858: Opened as Bromley
- 1 July 1858: renamed Shortlands
- 1892–1894: Quadrupled

Other information
- External links: Departures; Facilities
- Coordinates: 51.4064°N 0.0013°E

Shortlands railway station is in Shortlands, in the London Borough of Bromley in south London. It serves the southwest part of Bromley, and is 10 miles 3 chains (16.2 km) down the line from London Victoria. The station is located on the A222 road. Shortlands Junction, just west of the station, is where the Catford Loop Line joins the Chatham Main Line: the two lines are split into slow and fast pairs through the station, which consists of two island platforms on an embankment. The station is in London fare zone 4, and the station is managed by Southeastern and trains are operated by Southeastern and Thameslink.

== History ==
It was originally opened by the West End of London and Crystal Palace Railway on 3 May 1858. The station was enlarged and rebuilt to its present form in 1892–94.

Shortlands Junction was remodelled in the 1950s to allow line speeds to be increased, and was remodelled again with the construction of Ravensbourne chord (a dive-under pair of lines) in 2002 to increase the capacity of the junction, as part of the work to enhance the existing network in conjunction with the opening of the first section of High Speed 1, the high-speed link to the Channel Tunnel.

== Services ==
Services at Shortlands are operated by Southeastern and Thameslink using Class 465, 466 and 700 EMUs.

The typical off-peak service in trains per hour is:

- 4 tph to London Victoria via Herne Hill
- 2 tph to London Blackfriars via Catford
- 4 tph to Orpington
- 2 tph to Sevenoaks via Swanley

During the peak hours, additional services between Orpington, Kentish Town and Luton call at the station. In addition, the service to London Blackfriars is extended to and from Welwyn Garden City via Finsbury Park.

On weekends, the services between London Victoria and Orpington are reduced to two trains per hour.

Preceding station	National Rail	Following station
Ravensbourne	Thameslink Catford Loop Line	Bromley South
Beckenham Junction	Southeastern Bromley South Line	Bromley South

== Connections ==
London Buses routes 227, 358 and 367 serve the station.
