= Catford loop line =

Railway line in southeast London

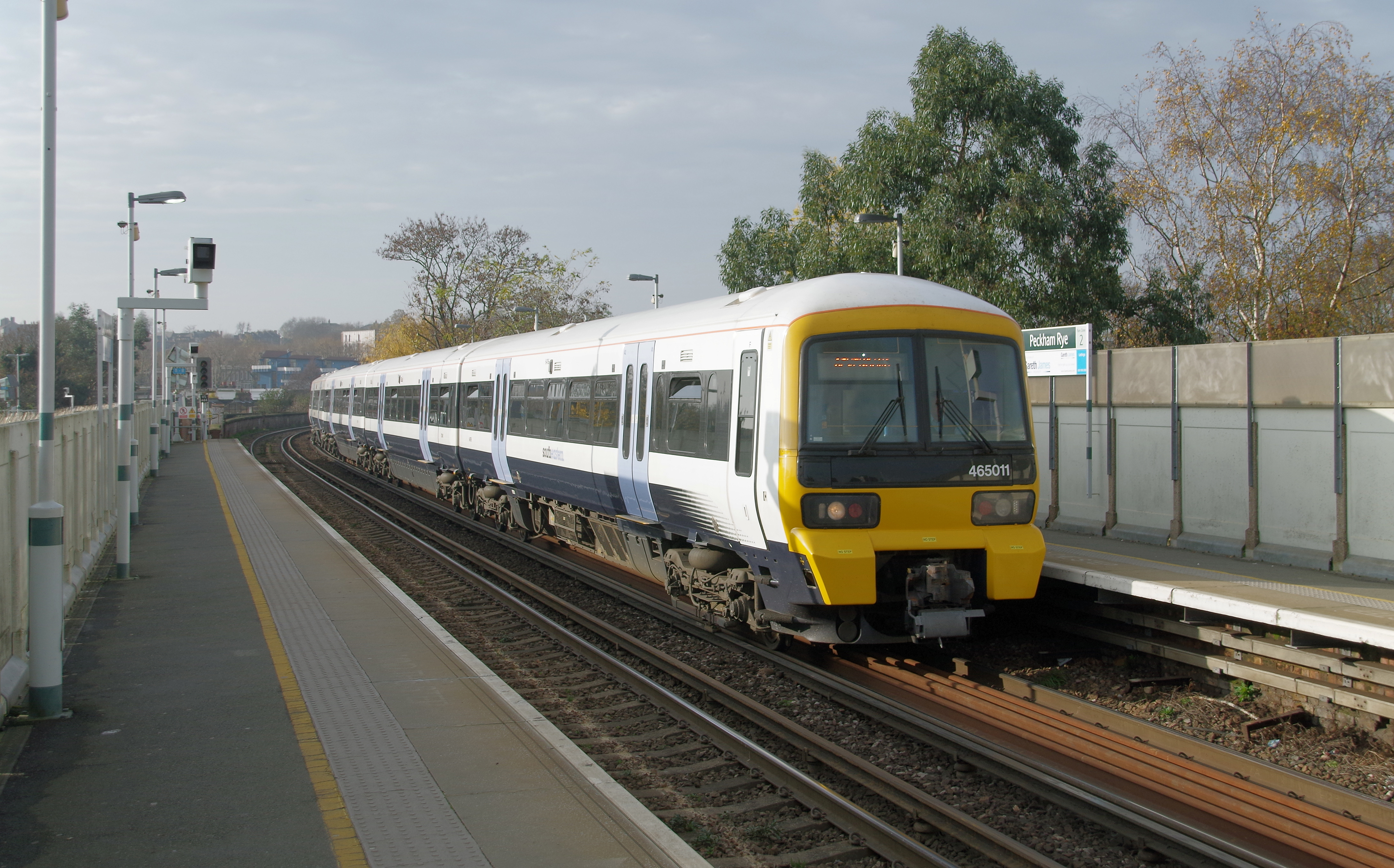
- Southeastern Class 465 at Peckham Rye in 2014

Overview
- Status: Operational
- Owner: Network Rail
- Locale: Greater London
- Termini: Nunhead; Ravensbourne
- Stations: 8

Service
- Type: Suburban rail, Freight rail
- System: National Rail
- Services: 1
- Operator(s): Southeastern; Thameslink
- Depot(s): Grove Park
- Rolling stock: Class 700; Class 375 "Electrostar"; Class 465 "Networker"; Class 466 "Networker"

History
- Opened: 1 July 1892

Technical
- Number of tracks: 2
- Track gauge: 4 ft 8 1/2 in (1,435 mm) standard gauge
- Electrification: 750 V DC third rail
- Operating speed: Maximum 60 mph (97 km/h)
Route map
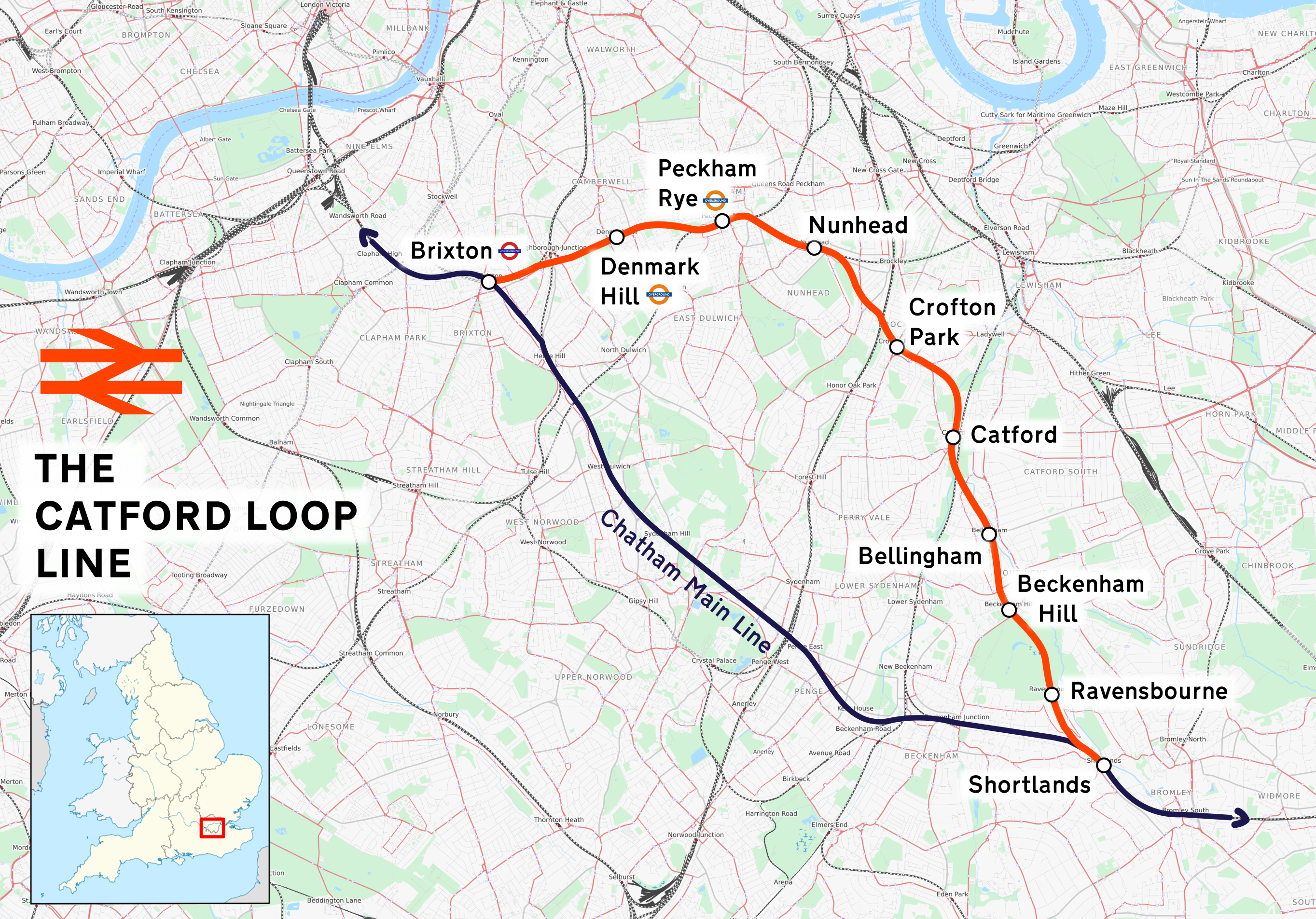
(Click to expand)

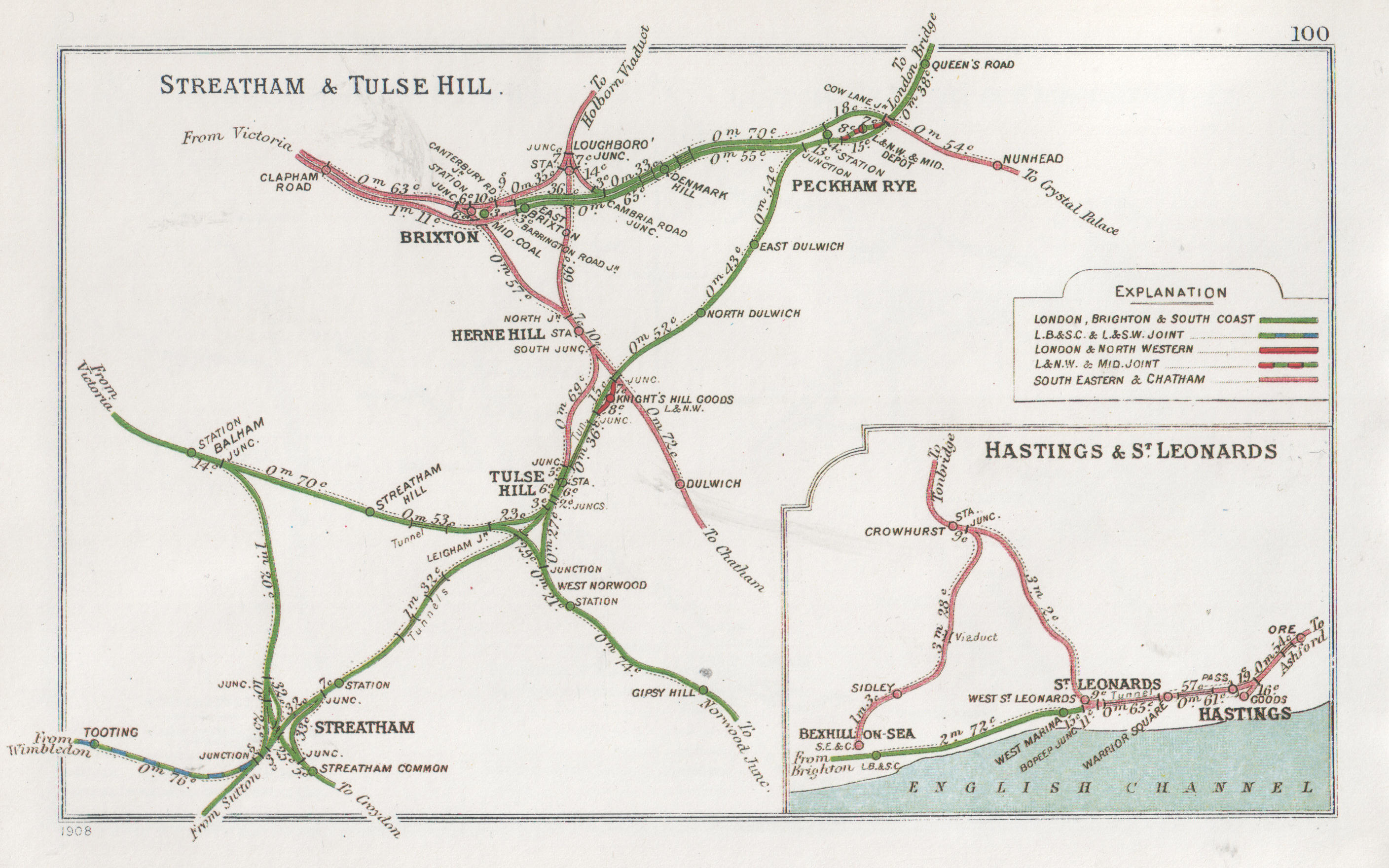
A 1908 Railway Clearing House map of the western end of the Catford loop line, showing how it connects with the South London line to rejoin the Chatham Main Line, thus creating the loop. Also note Loughboro Jct to access the City extension (now Thameslink).

The Catford loop line is a railway line in southeast London. It carries a suburban stopping passenger service from central London to Sevenoaks, and is also a relief route for the Chatham Main Line carrying passenger trains from London Victoria to the Kent coast. There is also much freight activity as this is the main route to Willesden and the north via Latchmere Junction. Freight traffic includes aggregates trains to and from locations along the Thames estuary, and Kent, aviation fuel running between Colnbrook (for Heathrow) and the Isle of Grain, and a small number of international workings from the Channel Tunnel via the yard at Dollands Moor. Until around 2013, a significant quantity of intermodal traffic from Thamesport used the line - however, the opening of London Gateway meant that the larger container ships stopped serving Thamesport and this traffic then ceased.

The line begins at Brixton Junction, where it diverges from the Chatham Main Line, and ends when it rejoins the Chatham Main Line (now extended to pairs of fast and slow lines) at Shortlands Junction, west of Shortlands station.

== Stations ==
- Brixton (platforms closed 1916)
- Denmark Hill
- Peckham Rye
- Nunhead
- Crofton Park
- Catford
- Bellingham
- Beckenham Hill
- Ravensbourne

== History ==
Shortlands and Nunhead Railway Act 1889
- Act of Parliament
- Parliament of the United Kingdom
- Long title: An Act for incorporating the Shortlands and Nunhead Railway Company and for authorising the Construction of a Railway in the Counties of Kent and Surrey and for other purposes.
- Citation: 52 & 53 Vict. c. cxxvi

Dates
- Royal assent: 12 August 1889

Incorporated as the Shortlands and Nunhead Railway by the Shortlands and Nunhead Railway Act 1889 (52 & 53 Vict. c. cxxvi) it was opened by the London, Chatham and Dover Railway on 1 July 1892. The line was vested in the London, Chatham and Dover Railway by the London, Chatham and Dover Railway (Further Powers) Act 1896 (59 & 60 Vict. c. cc).

The line left the former Crystal Palace High Level branch and the Nunhead to Lewisham link (the former Greenwich Park branch) at a junction east of Nunhead.

The five stations on the original route were:

- Crofton Park
- Catford
- Bellingham
- Beckenham Hill
- Ravensbourne

The length of the Catford Loop is nearly eight miles (13 km).

The line was electrified with the other SECR urban routes on 12 July 1925 by the Southern Railway on its 660 DC third-rail system.

As of 12 January 2015, Southeastern operates an hourly service from London Victoria to Dover Priory over the line; Denmark Hill is the only station on the line called at by this service (apart from a small number of peak hour trains which also call at Crofton Park and Bellingham). All other services originate from London Blackfriars and Thameslink Core and call at all stations.

== Services ==
The service in June 2022 is:

Off-peak / weekends:

- 2tph London Blackfriars via Elephant and Castle
- 2tph Sevenoaks via Swanley
- 1tph London Victoria (calling only at Denmark Hill)
- 1tph Gillingham via Chatham (calling only at Denmark Hill)

Peak hours:

- 2tph Welwyn Garden City via Elephant and Castle
- 2tph Sevenoaks via Swanley
- 2tph Luton/Kentish Town via London Blackfriars
- 2tph Orpington
- 2tph London Victoria (calling only at Denmark Hill)
- 2tph Gillingham via Chatham (calling only at Denmark Hill + a small number calling at Crofton Park and Bellingham)
