= Swanscombe railway station =

Railway station in Kent, England

Coordinates: 51.4491°N 0.3099°E

Swanscombe
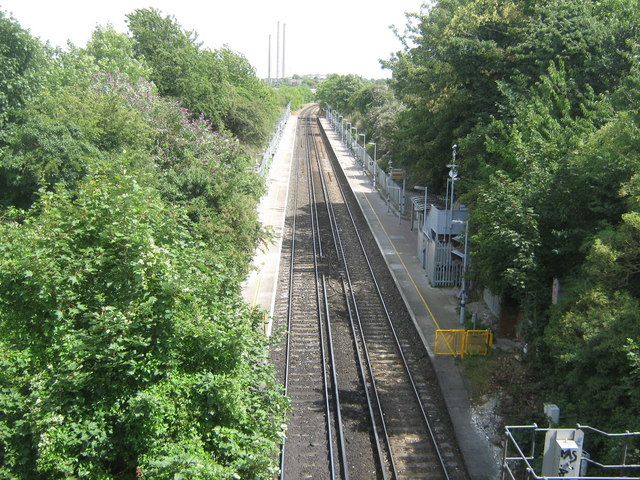

General information
- Location: Swanscombe, Borough of Dartford; England
- Grid reference: TQ606747
- Manager: Southeastern
- Platforms: 2

Other information
- Station code: SWM
- Classification: DfT category E

Key dates
- 2 November 1908: opened
- 6 July 1930: resited

Passengers
- 2020/21: ▼94,476
- 2021/22: ▲0.210 million
- 2022/23: ▲0.259 million
- 2023/24: ▲0.315 million
- 2024/25: ▲0.340 million
Location
Notes
- Passenger statistics from the Office of Rail and Road

Swanscombe railway station is a railway station that serves the village of Swanscombe in north Kent, England. It is 21 miles 14 chains (34.1 km) down the line from London Charing Cross.

== History ==
The first station, a small wooden halt, was opened in 1908. In 1930 the present station was opened 840 yards (770 m) east of the original.

The station is awkwardly located in a very deep chalk cutting, with a long staircase from the booking office leading to the up platform. The down platform is reached across a road overbridge and down another long flight of stairs. There is no step-free access to either platform. Passengers requiring step-free access are advised to use Greenhithe railway station.

The ticket office, on the 'up' side at road level, is located in a recent building. This is staffed only during part of the day; at other times a ticket machine is available and is located outside the ticket office. Until the 1980s, separate staffed ticket offices were located in buildings on each platform, suitably equipped with ticketing machinery. It was named and signed as Swanscombe Halt until the 1980s.

== Services ==
Services at Swanscombe are operated by Southeastern and Thameslink using Class 376, 465, 466, 700 and 707 EMUs.

The typical off-peak service in trains per hour is:

- 2 tph to London Charing Cross via Sidcup
- 2 tph to Luton via Woolwich Arsenal and Greenwich
- 2 tph to Gravesend
- 2 tph to Rainham via Chatham

Additional services, including trains to and from London Cannon Street via Woolwich Arsenal and Lewisham call at the station during the peak hours.

Preceding station	National Rail	Following station
Greenhithe	Southeastern North Kent Line	Northfleet
Greenhithe	Thameslink North Kent Line	Northfleet
