= Bellingham railway station =

National Rail station in London, England

Bellingham
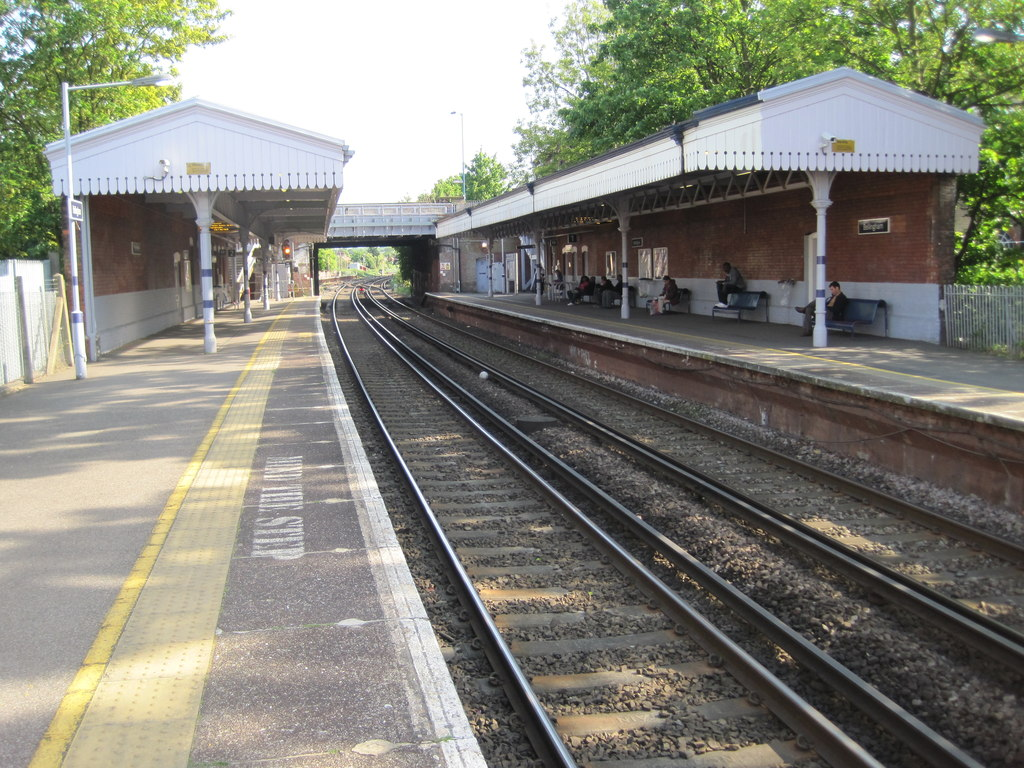
- Southbound view of the station in May 2011
- Interactive map of Bellingham

General information
- Location: Bellingham
- Local authority: London Borough of Lewisham
- Managed by: Thameslink
- Station code: BGM
- DfT category: E
- Number of platforms: 2
- Fare zone: 3

National Rail annual entry and exit
- 2020–21: ▼0.242 million
- 2021–22: ▲0.462 million
- 2022–23: ▲0.552 million
- 2023–24: ▲0.604 million
- 2024–25: ▲0.623 million

Key dates
- 1 July 1892: Opened

Other information
- External links: Departures; Facilities
- Coordinates: 51.43278°N 0.01944°W

Bellingham railway station is in the London Borough of Lewisham in south London. It is in London fare zone 3, and the station and all trains are operated by Thameslink. The station buildings lie on Randlesdown Road in Bellingham; the platforms are below street level. It is 8 miles 73 chains (14.3 km) measured from London Victoria.

== History ==
The station, which lies on what today is known as the Catford Loop, was opened on 1 July 1892.

On 5 July 2026, the station was temporarily renamed by Thameslink to Jude Bellingham railway station after footballer Jude Bellingham to celebrate and support the England national football team at the 2026 FIFA World Cup. The station reverted back to its original name on 13 July.

== Services ==
Off-peak, all services at Bellingham are operated by Thameslink using Class 700 EMUs.

The typical off-peak service in trains per hour is:

- 2 tph to London Blackfriars
- 2 tph to Sevenoaks via Swanley

During the peak hours, additional services between Orpington, Kentish Town and Luton call at the station. In addition, the service to London Blackfriars is extended to and from Welwyn Garden City via Finsbury Park.

The station is also served by a number of peak hour Southeastern services between London Victoria, Rochester and Gillingham. The station is served by four trains to London Victoria in the morning peak and two trains to Rochester, one of which continues to Gillingham, in the evening peak.

== Connections ==
The station is served by London Buses route 336 from Brookehowse Road towards both Catford and Locksbottom.

Preceding station	National Rail	Following station
Catford	Thameslink Catford Loop Line	Beckenham Hill
Crofton Park	Southeastern Chatham Main Line Peak Hours Only	Bromley South
