= Greater Thameslink Railway =

British state-owned train operating company

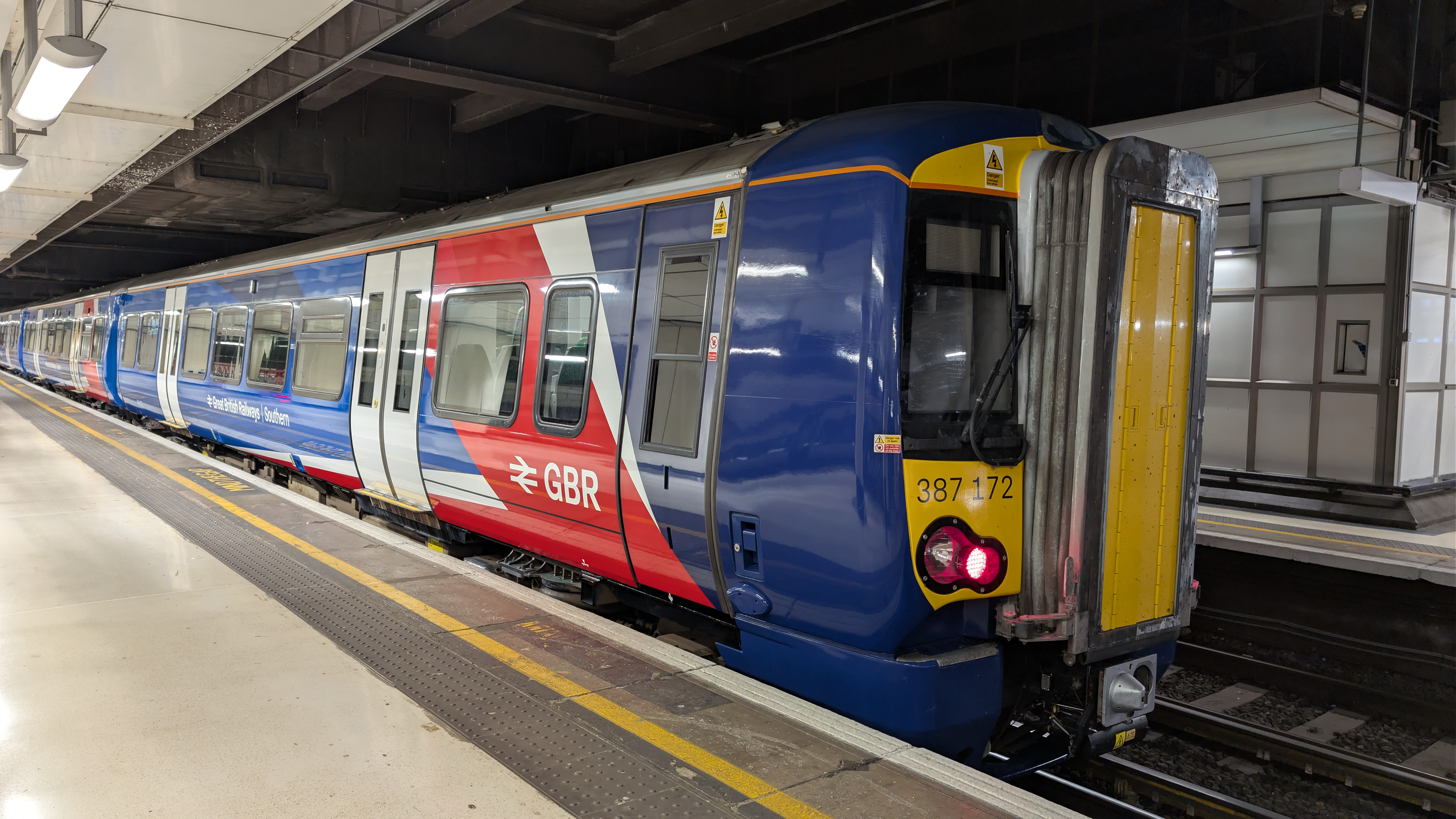
- A Class 387 in Great British Railways livery at London Victoria

Overview
- Main regions: East of England; Greater London; South East England
- Fleet: Class 171 Turbostar; Class 377 Electrostar; Class 379 Electrostar; Class 387 Electrostar; Class 700 Desiro City; Class 717 Desiro City
- Stations operated: 238
- Parent company: DfT Operator
- Reporting mark: GN, GX, SN, TL
- Predecessor: Govia Thameslink Railway

Other
- Website: gtrailway.com

Thameslink Southern Great Northern Limited, trading as Greater Thameslink Railway (GTR), is a state-owned British train operating company that took over the services of privately-owned operator Govia Thameslink Railway on 31 May 2026. It is owned by DfT Operator for the Department for Transport. The company runs trains under the sub-brands Gatwick Express, Great Northern, Southern and Thameslink.

== History ==
In the lead-up to the 2024 United Kingdom general election, the Labour Party of Keir Starmer committed itself to bring the passenger operations of the British rail network back under state ownership. Following its election win, the government introduced the Passenger Railway Services (Public Ownership) Act 2024 that received the royal assent in November 2024.

In September 2025, it was announced that the passenger rail services provided by Govia Thameslink Railway would transfer to state ownership on 31 May 2026.

== Services ==
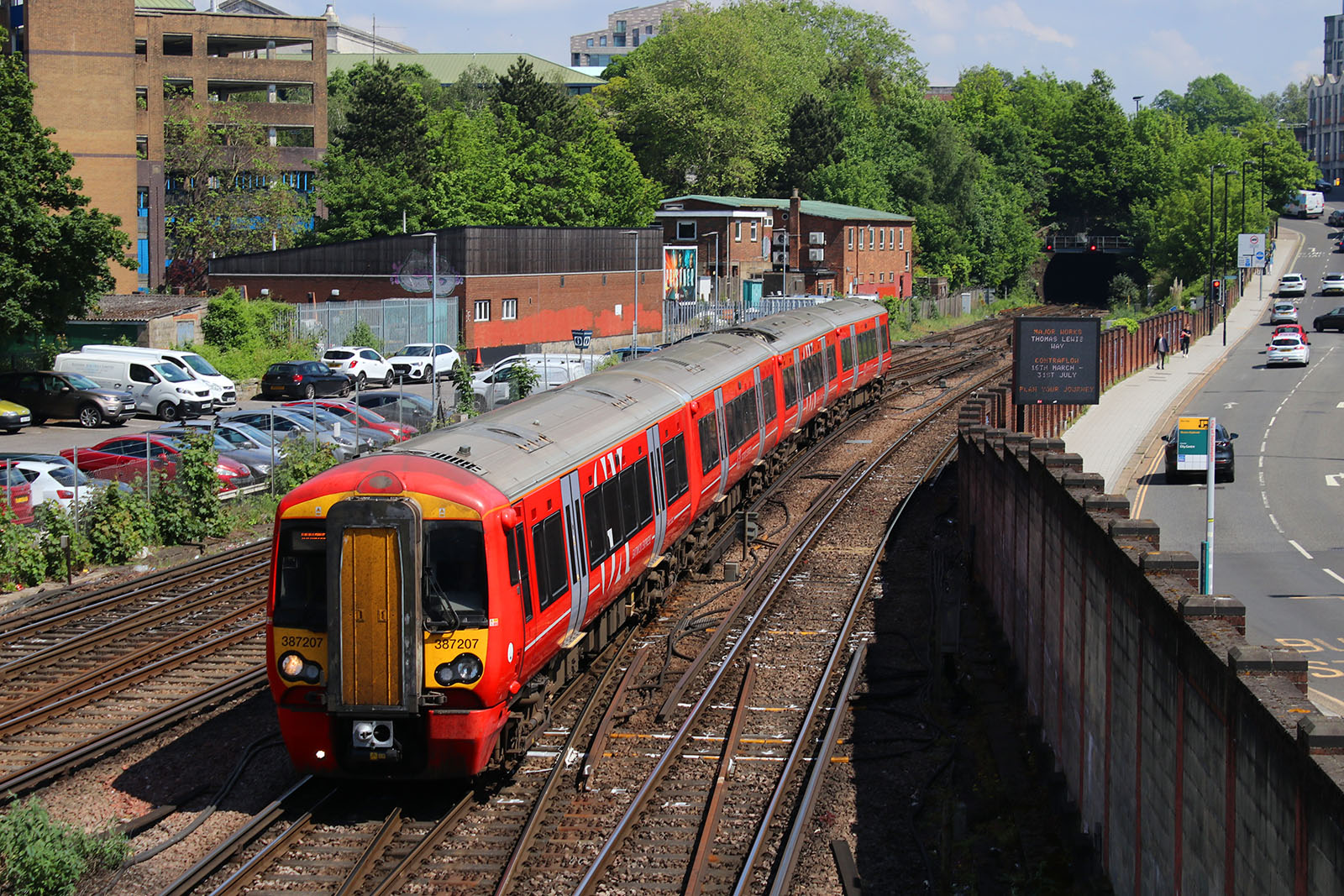
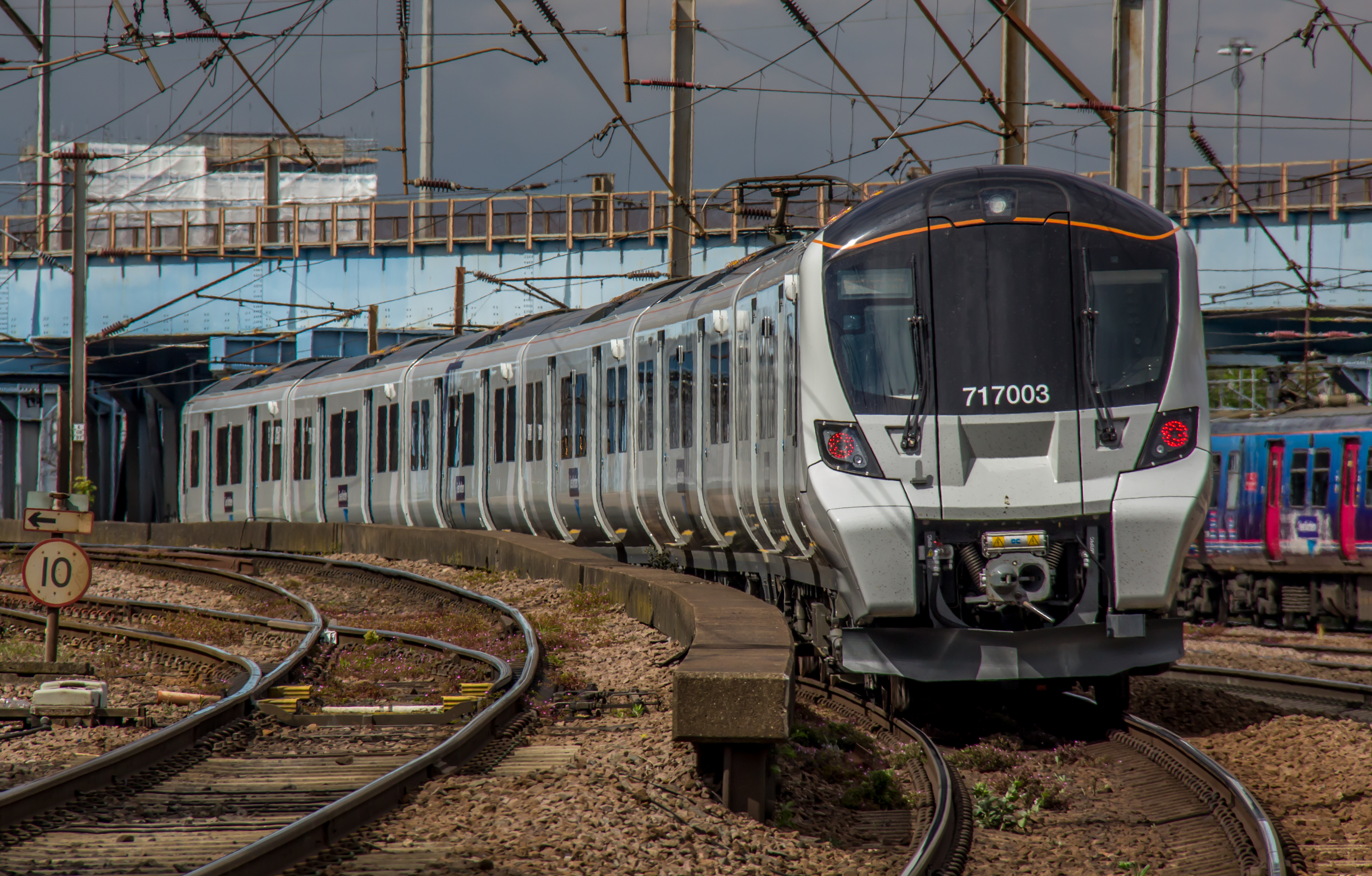
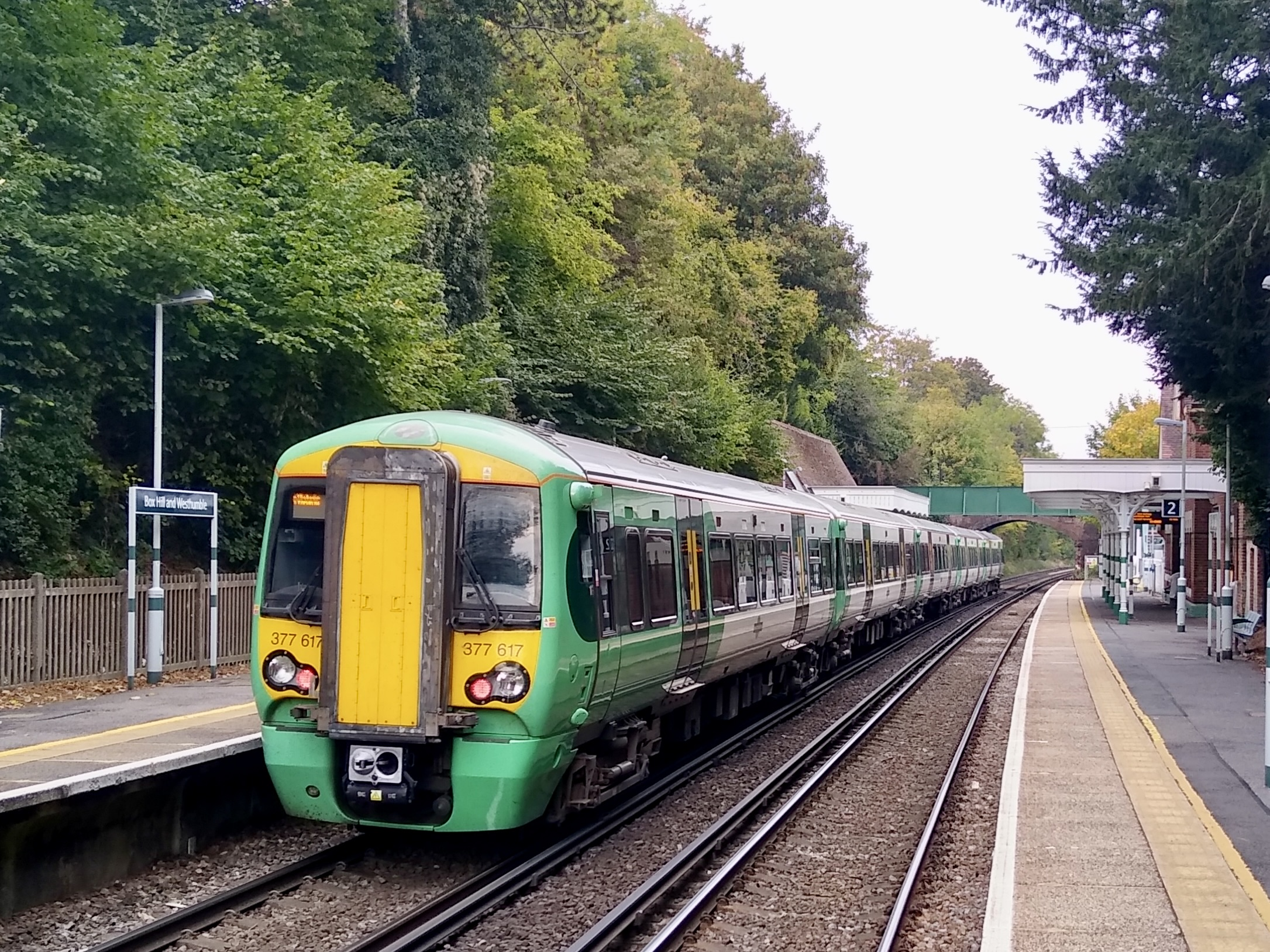
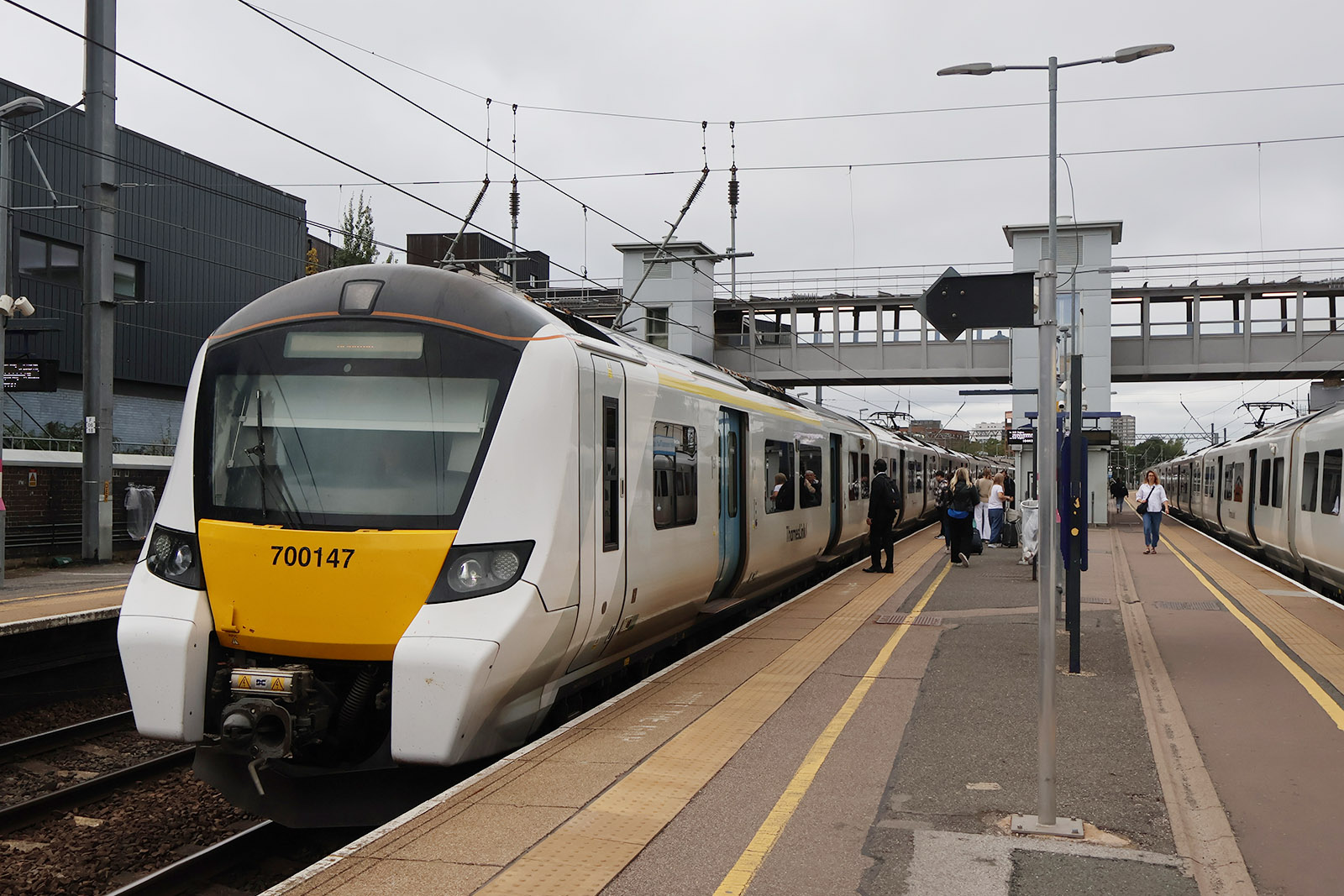
Gatwick Express, Great Northern, Southern, and Thameslink are the four sub-brands that make up Greater Thameslink Railway.

=== Gatwick Express ===
Gatwick Express operates an express commuter and airport transfer service between London Victoria, Gatwick Airport, Haywards Heath and Brighton. Between 6:00 am and 9:00 am on weekdays, northbound services call additionally at Preston Park, Hassocks and Burgess Hill. Services stop additionally at the same stations in the southbound direction between 5:00 pm and 8:00 pm.

As of May 2025, the off-peak Monday–Saturday, with frequencies in 'trains per hour' (tph), consists of:

| Route | tph | Calling at |
|---|---|---|
| London Victoria – Brighton | 2 | Gatwick Airport; Haywards Heath |

On Sundays, Gatwick Express operates a half-hourly shuttle service between London Victoria and Gatwick Airport only.

=== Great Northern ===
Great Northern is the name of the suburban rail services run on the southern end of Britain's East Coast Main Line and associated branches. Services operate both to and from London King's Cross and Moorgate. Destinations include Hertford North, Welwyn Garden City, Stevenage, Peterborough, Cambridge and King's Lynn. The Great Northern service pattern, as of June 2026, with frequencies in trains per hour (tph), consists of the following:

| Route | tph | Calling at |
|---|---|---|
| Moorgate – Welwyn Garden City | 2 | Old Street; Essex Road; Highbury & Islington; Drayton Park; Finsbury Park; Harringay; Hornsey; Alexandra Palace; New Southgate; Oakleigh Park; New Barnet; Hadley Wood; Potters Bar; Brookmans Park, Welham Green; Hatfield |
| Moorgate – Stevenage via Hertford North | 2 | Old Street; Essex Road; Highbury & Islington; Drayton Park; Finsbury Park; Harringay; Hornsey; Alexandra Palace; Bowes Park; Palmers Green; Winchmore Hill; Grange Park; Enfield Chase; Gordon Hill; Crews Hill; Cuffley; Bayford; Hertford North; Watton-at-Stone |
| London King's Cross – Letchworth Garden City | 1 | Finsbury Park; Alexandra Palace; Potters Bar; Hatfield; Welwyn Garden City; Welwyn North; Knebworth; Stevenage; Hitchin |
| London King's Cross – Cambridge | 1 | Finsbury Park; Alexandra Palace; Potters Bar; Hatfield; Welwyn Garden City; Welwyn North; Knebworth; Stevenage; Hitchin; Letchworth Garden City; Baldock; Royston; Meldreth; Shepreth; Foxton; Cambridge South |
| London King's Cross – Ely | 1 | Cambridge South; Cambridge; Cambridge North; Waterbeach |
| London King's Cross – King's Lynn | 1 | Cambridge South; Cambridge; Cambridge North; Waterbeach; Ely; Littleport; Downham Market; Watlington |

=== Southern ===
Southern routes run from London Victoria and London Bridge through the South London suburbs of Battersea, Norbury, Peckham, Sydenham, Crystal Palace, Norwood, Croydon, Streatham, Purley and Sutton to towns surrounding London including Caterham, Epsom and Tadworth.

Further afield, Southern also serve Redhill, Tonbridge, Uckfield, East Grinstead, Gatwick Airport, Brighton, Ashford International, Worthing, Hastings, Portsmouth Harbour, Eastbourne, Horsham, Southampton Central, Littlehampton and Bognor Regis. Additionally, Southern run West London route services from Watford Junction to East Croydon via Clapham Junction. The standard off-peak service as of May 2026 is:

Brighton Main Line
| Route | tph | Calling at |
|---|---|---|
| London Victoria – Littlehampton | 2 | Clapham Junction; East Croydon; Gatwick Airport; Haywards Heath; Burgess Hill; Hassocks; Preston Park; Hove; Portslade; Shoreham-by-Sea; Lancing; Worthing; West Worthing; Durrington-on-Sea; Goring-by-Sea; Angmering |
| London Victoria – Eastbourne | 1 | Clapham Junction; East Croydon; Gatwick Airport; Haywards Heath; Wivelsfield; Cooksbridge; Lewes; Polegate; Hampden Park |
| London Victoria – Ore | 1 | Clapham Junction; East Croydon; Gatwick Airport; Haywards Heath; Wivelsfield; Plumpton; Lewes; Polegate; Eastbourne (Note: Trains reverse here); Hampden Park; Pevensey & Westham; Normans Bay; Cooden Beach; Collington; Bexhill; St Leonards Warrior Square; Hastings |
Arun Valley line
| Route | tph | Calling at |
| London Victoria – Portsmouth Harbour | 2 | Clapham Junction; East Croydon; Gatwick Airport; Three Bridges; Crawley; Horsham; Barnham; Chichester; Fishbourne (1 tph); Bosham (1 tph); Nutbourne (1 tph); Southbourne; Emsworth; Warblington (1 tph); Havant; Hilsea; Fratton; Portsmouth & Southsea; This route splits/merges at Horsham with the route to Bognor Regis (see below). Fishbourne, Bosham, Nutbourne and Warblington are served by the same train |
| London Victoria – Bognor Regis | 2 | Clapham Junction; East Croydon; Gatwick Airport; Three Bridges; Crawley; Horsham; Christ's Hospital; Billingshurst; Pulborough; Amberley; Arundel; Ford; Barnham; This route splits/merges at Horsham with the route to Portsmouth Harbour, see above. |
Seaford branch line
| Route | tph | Calling at |
| Brighton – Seaford | 2 | London Road (Brighton); Moulsecoomb; Falmer; Lewes; Southease (1 tph); Newhaven Town; Newhaven Harbour (1 tph); Bishopstone; Services alternate between serving Southease and Newhaven Harbour |
East Coastway and Marshlink lines
| Route | tph | Calling at |
| Brighton – Eastbourne | 1 | London Road (Brighton); Moulsecoomb; Falmer; Lewes; Glynde; Berwick; Polegate; Hampden Park |
| Brighton – Ore | 1 | Falmer; Lewes; Polegate; Hampden Park (Ore-bound only); Eastbourne; Hampden Park (Brighton-bound only); Bexhill; St Leonards Warrior Square; Hastings |
| Eastbourne – Ashford International | 1 | Hampden Park; Pevensey & Westham; Cooden Beach; Collington; Bexhill; St Leonards Warrior Square; Hastings; Ore; Three Oaks; Winchelsea; Rye; Appledore; Ham Street |
West Coastway line
| Route | tph | Calling at |
| Brighton – Southampton Central | 2 | Hove; Portslade; Southwick; Shoreham-by-Sea; Lancing; Worthing; Angmering; Ford; Barnham; Chichester; Southbourne; Emsworth; Havant; Cosham; Portchester (1 tph); Fareham; Swanwick; Woolston |
| Brighton – Portsmouth & Southsea | 1 | Hove; Portslade; Southwick; Shoreham-by-Sea; Lancing; East Worthing; Worthing; West Worthing; Durrington-on-Sea; Goring-by-Sea; Angmering; Barnham; Chichester; Havant; Fratton |
| Brighton to Chichester via Littlehampton | 1 | Hove; Aldrington; Portslade; Fishersgate; Southwick; Shoreham-by-Sea; Lancing; East Worthing; Worthing; West Worthing; Durrington-on-Sea; Goring-by-Sea; Angmering; Littlehampton; Ford; Barnham |
| Barnham – Bognor Regis | 2 | Shuttle service |
Oxted line
| Route | tph | Calling at |
| London Victoria – East Grinstead | 2 | Clapham Junction; East Croydon; Sanderstead, Riddlesdown; Upper Warlingham; Woldingham; Oxted; Hurst Green; Lingfield; Dormans |
| London Bridge – Uckfield | 1 | East Croydon; Oxted; Hurst Green; Edenbridge Town; Hever; Cowden; Ashurst; Eridge; Crowborough; Buxted |
Reigate and Redhill–Tonbridge line
| Route | tph | Calling at |
| London Victoria – Reigate | 2 | Clapham Junction; East Croydon; Purley; Coulsdon South; Merstham; Redhill |
| Redhill – Tonbridge | 1 | Nutfield; Godstone; Edenbridge; Penshurst; Leigh |
West London Route
| Route | tph | Calling at |
| Watford Junction – East Croydon | 1 | Harrow & Wealdstone; Wembley Central; Shepherd's Bush; Kensington (Olympia); West Brompton; Imperial Wharf; Clapham Junction; Balham; Streatham Common; Norbury; Thornton Heath; Selhurst |
Mole Valley Line
| Route | tph | Calling at |
| London Victoria – Dorking | 1 | Clapham Junction; Balham; Mitcham Eastfields; Mitcham Junction; Hackbridge; Carshalton; Sutton; Cheam; Epsom; Ashtead; Leatherhead |
| London Victoria – Horsham | 1 | Clapham Junction; Balham; Mitcham Eastfields; Mitcham Junction; Hackbridge; Carshalton; Sutton; Cheam; Ewell East; Epsom; Ashtead; Leatherhead; Box Hill & Westhumble; Dorking; Holmwood; Ockley; Warnham |
| London Bridge – Epsom | 2 | Norwood Junction; West Croydon; Waddon; Wallington; Carshalton Beeches; Sutton; Cheam; Ewell East |
Caterham and Tattenham Corner lines
| Route | tph | Calling at |
| London Bridge – Caterham | 2 | Norwood Junction; East Croydon; South Croydon; Purley Oaks; Purley; Kenley; Whyteleafe; Whyteleafe South; This route splits/merges at Purley with the route to Tattenham Corner, see below. |
| London Bridge – Tattenham Corner | 2 | Norwood Junction; East Croydon; South Croydon; Purley Oaks; Purley; Reedham; Coulsdon Town; Woodmansterne; Chipstead; Kingswood; Tadworth; This route splits/merges at Purley with the route to Caterham, see above. |
London Metro
| Route | tph | Calling at |
| London Victoria – Epsom Downs | 2 | Battersea Park; Clapham Junction; Wandsworth Common; Balham; Streatham Common; Norbury; Thornton Heath; Selhurst; West Croydon; Waddon; Wallington; Carshalton Beeches; Sutton; Belmont; Banstead |
| London Victoria – West Croydon | 2 | Battersea Park; Clapham Junction; Balham; Streatham Hill; West Norwood; Gipsy Hill; Crystal Palace; Norwood Junction |
| London Victoria – London Bridge | 2 | Battersea Park; Clapham Junction; Wandsworth Common; Balham; Streatham Hill; West Norwood; Gipsy Hill; Crystal Palace; Sydenham; Forest Hill; Honor Oak Park; Brockley; New Cross Gate |
| London Bridge – East Croydon | 2 | South Bermondsey; Queens Road Peckham; Peckham Rye; East Dulwich; North Dulwich; Tulse Hill; Streatham; Streatham Common; Norbury; Thornton Heath; Selhurst |
| London Bridge – Beckenham Junction | 2 | South Bermondsey; Queens Road Peckham; Peckham Rye; East Dulwich; North Dulwich; Tulse Hill; West Norwood; Gipsy Hill; Crystal Palace; Birkbeck |

=== Thameslink ===
Thameslink is a 68-station main-line route running 225 km (140 miles) through London from Bedford to Brighton, serving both Gatwick Airport and Luton Airport, with a suburban loop serving Sutton, Mitcham and Wimbledon and a suburban line via Catford and Bromley South to Sevenoaks. As of June 2026: The Monday–Friday off-peak service pattern, with frequencies in trains per hour (tph), includes:

Thameslink Monday–Friday off-peak service pattern
| Route | tph | Calling at |
|---|---|---|
| Bedford to Brighton | 2 | Flitwick; Harlington; Leagrave; Luton; Luton Airport Parkway; Harpenden; St Albans City; West Hampstead Thameslink; London St Pancras International; Farringdon; City Thameslink; London Blackfriars; London Bridge; East Croydon; Gatwick Airport; Three Bridges; Balcombe; Haywards Heath; Wivelsfield; Burgess Hill; Hassocks; Preston Park |
| Bedford to Three Bridges via Redhill | 2 | Flitwick; Harlington; Leagrave; Luton; Luton Airport Parkway; Harpenden; St Albans City; London St Pancras International; Farringdon; City Thameslink; London Blackfriars; London Bridge; Norwood Junction; East Croydon; South Croydon; Purley; Redhill; Earlswood; Salfords; Horley; Gatwick Airport; In the evening, this service only runs between Luton and Three Bridges |
| Peterborough to Horsham via Redhill | 2 | Huntingdon; St Neots; Sandy; Biggleswade; Arlesey; Hitchin; Stevenage; Finsbury Park; London St Pancras International; Farringdon; City Thameslink; London Blackfriars; London Bridge; East Croydon; Coulsdon South; Merstham; Redhill; Horley; Gatwick Airport; Three Bridges; Crawley; Ifield; Littlehaven |
| Cambridge to Brighton | 2 | Cambridge South; Royston; Ashwell & Morden; Baldock; Letchworth Garden City; Hitchin; Stevenage; Finsbury Park; London St Pancras International; Farringdon; City Thameslink; London Blackfriars; London Bridge; East Croydon; Gatwick Airport; Three Bridges; Haywards Heath; Burgess Hill |
| London Blackfriars to Sevenoaks via Catford and Otford | 2 | Elephant & Castle; Denmark Hill; Peckham Rye; Nunhead; Crofton Park; Catford; Bellingham; Beckenham Hill; Ravensbourne; Shortlands; Bromley South; Bickley; St Mary Cray; Swanley; Eynsford; Shoreham; Otford; Bat & Ball |
| Luton to Rainham via Greenwich | 2 | Luton Airport Parkway; Harpenden; St Albans City; Radlett; Elstree & Borehamwood; Mill Hill Broadway; Brent Cross West; West Hampstead Thameslink; London St Pancras International; Farringdon; City Thameslink; London Blackfriars; London Bridge; Deptford; Greenwich; Maze Hill; Westcombe Park; Charlton; Woolwich Arsenal; Plumstead; Abbey Wood; Slade Green; Dartford; Stone Crossing; Greenhithe; Swanscombe; Northfleet; Gravesend; Higham; Strood; Rochester; Chatham; Gillingham; In the evening, this service only runs between Kentish Town and Rainham |
| St Albans City to Sutton via Wimbledon (loop) | 2 | Radlett; Elstree & Borehamwood; Mill Hill Broadway; Hendon; Brent Cross West; Cricklewood; West Hampstead Thameslink; Kentish Town; London St Pancras International; Farringdon; City Thameslink; London Blackfriars; Elephant & Castle; Loughborough Junction; Herne Hill; Tulse Hill; Streatham; Tooting; Haydons Road; Wimbledon; Wimbledon Chase; South Merton; Morden South; St Helier; Sutton Common; West Sutton; Services then continue to/from St Albans City via Mitcham Junction (see below) |
| St Albans City to Sutton via Mitcham Junction (loop) | 2 | Radlett; Elstree & Borehamwood; Mill Hill Broadway; Hendon; Brent Cross West; Cricklewood; West Hampstead Thameslink; Kentish Town; London St Pancras International; Farringdon; City Thameslink; London Blackfriars; Elephant & Castle; Loughborough Junction; Herne Hill; Tulse Hill; Streatham; Mitcham Eastfields; Mitcham Junction; Hackbridge; Carshalton; Services then continue to/from St Albans City via Wimbledon (see above) |

== Rolling stock ==
Greater Thameslink Railway inherited the following trains from its predecessor:

| Family | Class | Image | Type | Top speed | | Number | Carriages | Routes operated | Built |
| Family | Class | Image | Type | mph | km/h | Number | Carriages | Routes operated | Built |
Gatwick Express
| Bombardier Electrostar | 387 | | EMU | 110 | 177 | 18 | 4 | London Victoria to Brighton | 2015–2016 |
Great Northern
| Bombardier Electrostar | 379 | | EMU | 100 | 160 | 30 | 4 | London King's Cross to Ely/King's Lynn; London King's Cross to Letchworth Garden City/Cambridge | 2010–2011 |
| Bombardier Electrostar | 387 | | EMU | 110 | 177 | 12 | 4 | London King's Cross to Ely/King's Lynn; London King's Cross to Letchworth Garden City/Cambridge | 2014–2017 |
| Siemens Desiro | 717 Desiro City | | EMU | 85 | 137 | 25 | 6 | Moorgate to Welwyn Garden City; Moorgate to Stevenage via Hertford North | 2018 |
Southern
| Bombardier Turbostar | 171 | | DMU | 100 | 160 | 13 | 3 | London Bridge to Uckfield; Eastbourne to Ashford International | 2003–04 |
| Bombardier Turbostar | 171 | | DMU | 100 | 160 | 4 | 2 | London Bridge to Uckfield; Eastbourne to Ashford International | 2003–04 |
| Bombardier Electrostar | 377/1 | | EMU | 100 | 160 | 55 | 4 | Entire Southern network apart from sections between Hurst Green and Uckfield & between Ore and Ashford International | 2001–14 |
| Bombardier Electrostar | 377/2 | | EMU | 100 | 160 | 15 | 4 | Entire Southern network apart from sections between Hurst Green and Uckfield & between Ore and Ashford International | 2001–14 |
| Bombardier Electrostar | 377/3 | | EMU | 100 | 160 | 28 | 3 | Entire Southern network apart from sections between Hurst Green and Uckfield & between Ore and Ashford International | 2001–14 |
| Bombardier Electrostar | 377/4 | | EMU | 100 | 160 | 75 | 4 | Entire Southern network apart from sections between Hurst Green and Uckfield & between Ore and Ashford International | 2001–14 |
| Bombardier Electrostar | 377/6 | | EMU | 100 | 160 | 26 | 5 | Entire Southern network apart from sections between Hurst Green and Uckfield & between Ore and Ashford International | 2001–14 |
| Bombardier Electrostar | 377/7 | | EMU | 100 | 160 | 8 | 5 | Entire Southern network apart from sections between Hurst Green and Uckfield & between Ore and Ashford International | 2001–14 |
| Bombardier Electrostar | 387/1; 387/2; 387/3 | | EMU | 110 | 177 | 46 (Shared with Gatwick Express) | 4 | London Victoria to Eastbourne/Ore; Brighton to Eastbourne/Ore; Brighton to Southampton Central | 2016–17 |
Thameslink
| Siemens Desiro | 700 Desiro City | | EMU | 100 | 161 | 60 (shared with Great Northern) | 8 | Entire Thameslink network | 2015–2018 |
| Siemens Desiro | 700 Desiro City | | EMU | 100 | 161 | 55 | 12 | Entire Thameslink network | 2015–2018 |

== Future ==
=== TfL takeover ===
On 20 September 2025, Transport for London (TfL) submitted an outline business case to take over Great Northern services from Moorgate to Welwyn Garden City, Hertford North, and Stevenage and integrate it into the London Overground network. TfL wants to increase the number of trains from 2 to 4 trains per hour, standardise fares across the route, serve a 21,000 home development at Crews Hill, and boost growth in North London and Hertfordshire. The takeover could occur in Autumn 2027, if approval is given by DfT. However, the Overground services would use the existing Class 717 stock.
