= Ravensbourne railway station =

National Rail station in London, England

Ravensbourne
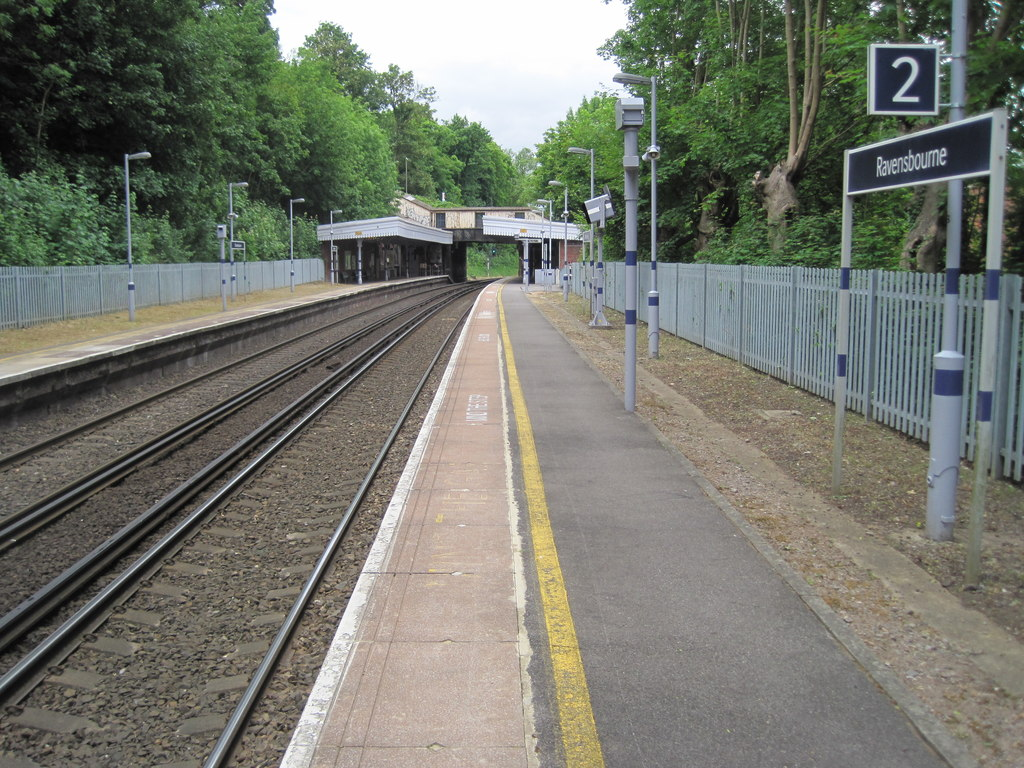
- Interactive map of Ravensbourne

General information
- Location: Beckenham
- Local authority: London Borough of Bromley
- Managed by: Thameslink
- Station code: RVB
- DfT category: E
- Number of platforms: 2
- Fare zone: 4

National Rail annual entry and exit
- 2020–21: ▼63,464
- 2021–22: ▲0.150 million
- 2022–23: ▲0.201 million
- 2023–24: ▲0.225 million
- 2024–25: ▲0.235 million

Key dates
- 1 July 1892: Opened

Other information
- External links: Departures; Facilities
- Coordinates: 51.4141°N 0.0075°W

Ravensbourne railway station is in the London Borough of Bromley in south London. The station adjoins Beckenham Place Park and serves the north edge of Beckenham and Shortlands.

It is 10 miles 34 chains (16.8 km) measured from London Victoria. It is in London fare zone 4, and the station and all trains are operated by Thameslink.

Opened in 1892 by the London, Chatham and Dover Railway as part of their new Catford Loop line, the station retains its Victorian air of a quiet country station although its roadside booking office was rebuilt after a fire in 1988.

== Services ==
All services at Ravensbourne are operated by Thameslink using Class 700 EMUs.

The typical off-peak service in trains per hour is:

- 2 tph to London Blackfriars
- 2 tph to Sevenoaks via Swanley

During the peak hours, additional services between Orpington, Kentish Town and Luton call at the station. In addition, the service to London Blackfriars is extended to and from Welwyn Garden City via Finsbury Park.

| Preceding station | National Rail | Following station |
|---|---|---|
| Beckenham Hill | Thameslink Catford Loop Line | Shortlands |
