= Beckenham Hill railway station =

National Rail station in London, England

Beckenham Hill
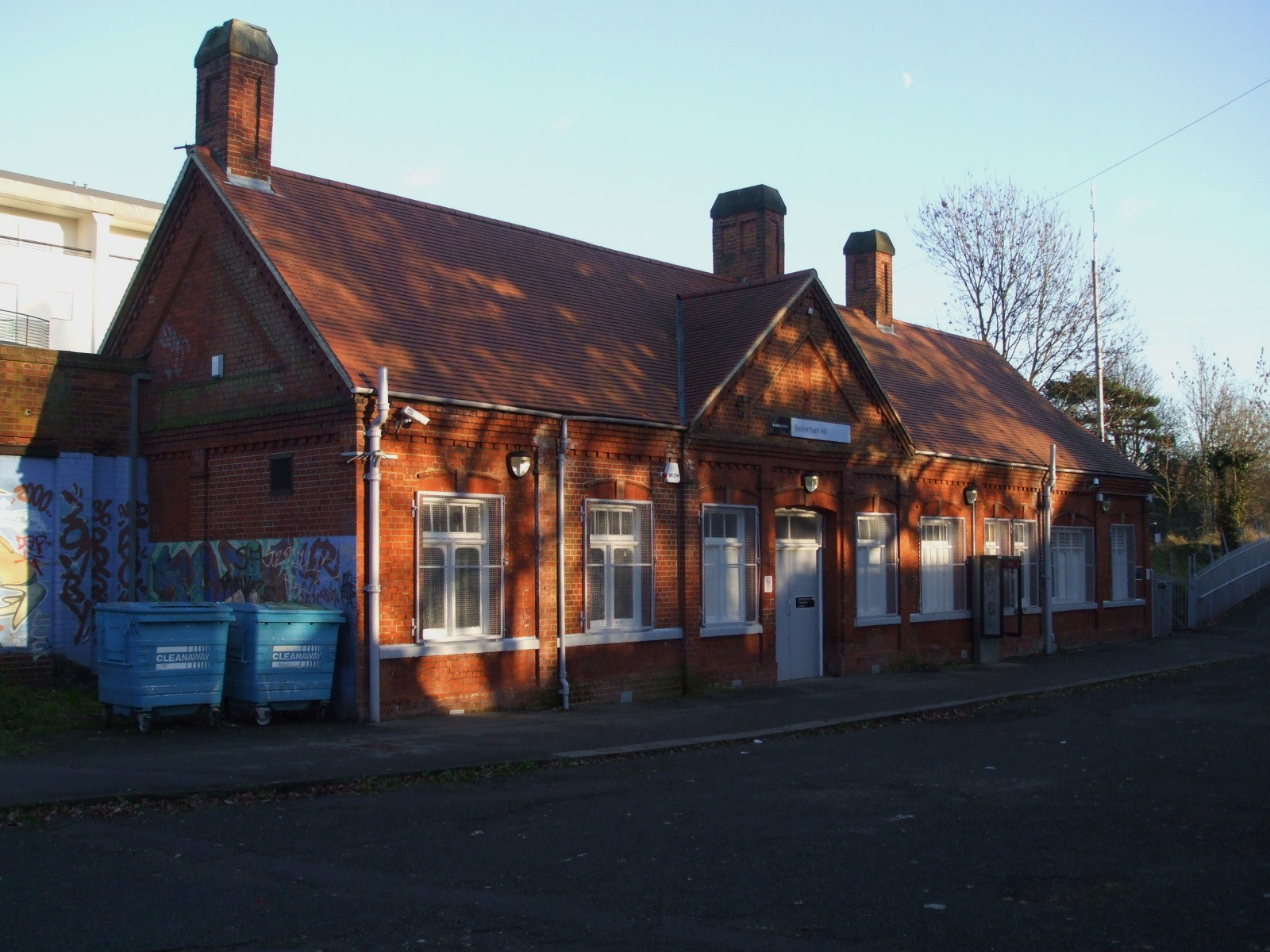
- Main building at Beckenham Hill station, on the up side, in 2008
- Interactive map of Beckenham Hill

General information
- Location: Southend Road/Downham
- Local authority: London Borough of Lewisham
- Managed by: Thameslink
- Station code: BEC
- DfT category: E
- Number of platforms: 2
- Accessible: Yes
- Fare zone: 4

National Rail annual entry and exit
- 2020–21: ▼0.129 million
- 2021–22: ▲0.265 million
- 2022–23: ▲0.312 million
- 2023–24: ▲0.353 million
- 2024–25: ▲0.379 million

Key dates
- 1 July 1892: Opened

Other information
- External links: Departures; Facilities
- Coordinates: 51.4246°N 0.0161°W

Beckenham Hill railway station is in the London Borough of Lewisham in south London, very close to the border with Bromley. It is 9 miles 45 chains (15.4 km) measured from London Victoria.

It is in London fare zone 4, and the station and all trains are operated by Thameslink. It serves the mainly residential areas of Southend Road and Downham as well as parts of Bellingham.

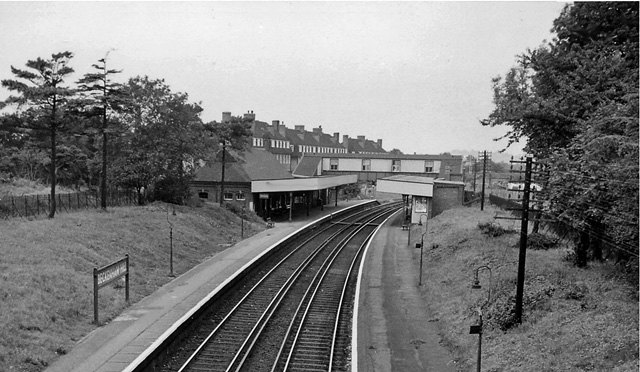
The station in 1962

== Services ==
All services at Beckenham Hill are operated by Thameslink using Class 700 EMUs.

The typical off-peak service in trains per hour is:

- 2 tph to London Blackfriars
- 2 tph to Sevenoaks via Swanley

During the peak hours, additional services between Orpington, Kentish Town and Luton call at the station. In addition, the service to London Blackfriars is extended to and from Welwyn Garden City via Finsbury Park.

Preceding station	National Rail	Following station
Bellingham	Thameslink Catford Loop Line	Ravensbourne

== Connections ==
London Buses route 54 serve the station.
