= Catford railway station =

National Rail station in London, England

Catford
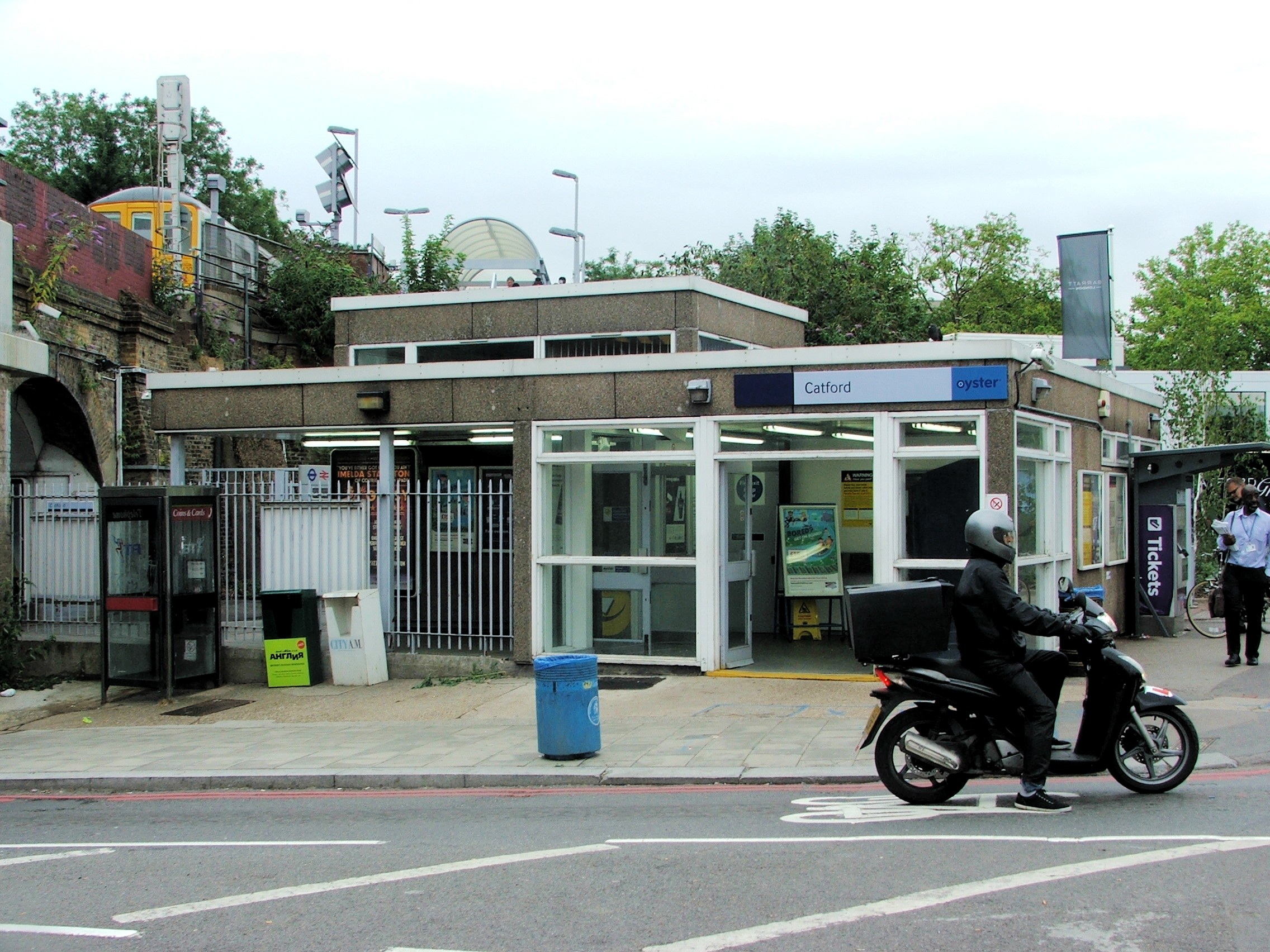
- The station building in August 2015
- Interactive map of Catford

General information
- Location: Catford
- Local authority: London Borough of Lewisham
- Managed by: Thameslink
- Station code: CTF
- DfT category: D
- Number of platforms: 2
- Fare zone: 3
- OSI: Catford Bridge

National Rail annual entry and exit
- 2020–21: ▼0.323 million
- Interchange: ▼33,810
- 2021–22: ▲0.581 million
- Interchange: ▲89,975
- 2022–23: ▲0.687 million
- Interchange: ▲0.142 million
- 2023–24: ▲0.745 million
- Interchange: ▲0.175 million
- 2024–25: ▲0.777 million
- Interchange: ▲0.188 million

Key dates
- 1 July 1892: Opened

Other information
- External links: Departures; Facilities
- Coordinates: 51.4447°N 0.0261°W

Catford railway station is one of two stations in the London suburb of Catford. Mainly used by commuters, it is in London fare zone 3 and on the Catford Loop Line between Crofton Park and Bellingham. It is served mainly by Thameslink trains between West Hampstead Thameslink, London Blackfriars and Sevenoaks. Connections to London Victoria are available at Peckham Rye. Catford is 8 miles 3 chains (12.9 km) measured from Victoria.

It is adjacent to, and on a higher level than, Catford Bridge railway station on the Mid-Kent Line. The two stations are separated by the site of the former Catford Stadium. Interchange on one ticket is allowed between the two stations.

== Services ==
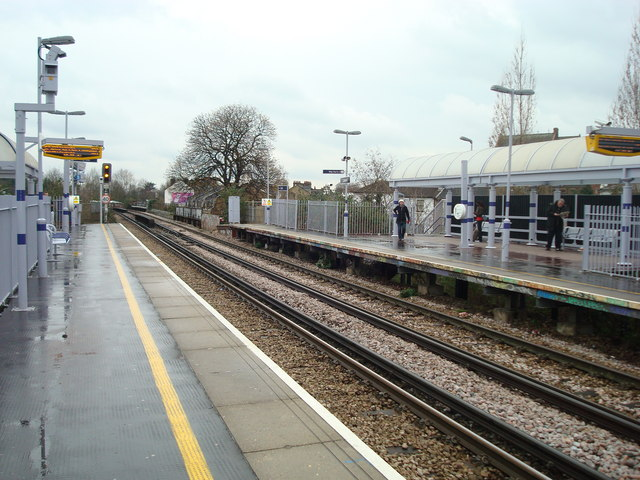
Northbound view of the station in March 2008

All services at Catford are operated by Thameslink using Class 700 EMUs.

The typical off-peak service in trains per hour is:

- 2 tph to London Blackfriars
- 2 tph to Sevenoaks via Swanley

During the peak hours, additional services between Orpington, Kentish Town and Luton call at the station. In addition, the service to London Blackfriars is extended to and from Welwyn Garden City via Finsbury Park.

Preceding station	National Rail	Following station
Crofton Park	Thameslink Catford Loop Line	Bellingham

== 1945 derailment ==
On 23 September 1945, a Victoria to Ramsgate train derailed on its approach to the station, much of it falling down the embankment towards Catford Stadium. One passenger was killed, and many others were injured (the train had been carrying 377 passengers). The enquiry concluded that it was probably caused by an unnoticed track defect that perhaps arose from heavy rainfall in the preceding days.

== In the media ==
The second episode of the 1979 London Weekend Television comedy series End of Part One includes the main characters watching a film called "The Life of Christopher Columbus". In the film, Columbus goes to a tube station and asks for a train to America, but is told he can only go as far as Catford. Part of a modified tube map is shown with the fictitious tube stations Lewisham, Ladywell, Edge of the World and Catford on the East London section of the Metropolitan line south from New Cross tube station. This is based on the main line railway line serving Catford Bridge railway station.

== Connections ==
London Buses routes 75, 124, 171, 181, 185, 202, 284 and night route N171 serve the station.
