= Three Bridges =

Three Bridges may refer to:

== England ==
- Three Bridges, West Sussex, a neighbourhood within the town of Crawley
  - Three Bridges F.C., an association football team
  - Three Bridges railway station
  - Three Bridges depot, a rail depot
- Three Bridges, Lincolnshire
- Three Bridges, London, Isambard Kingdom Brunel’s last major undertaking in 1859
- St Bernard's Hospital, Hanwell, London

== United States ==
- Three Bridges, New Jersey, an unincorporated village of Readington, United States
- Three Bridges School, part of Readington Township Public Schools, New Jersey
- Three Bridges (gospel group), a southern gospel vocal trio

== Elsewhere ==
- Three Bridges, Victoria, Australia
- Triple Bridge, a landmark in Ljubljana, Slovenia
