= Hornsey Depot =

Railway maintenance facility in Borough of Haringey, London

The area around Hornsey railway station in Hornsey (London Borough of Haringey) has been the site of several railway maintenance facilities from the mid-19th century onwards.

Initial developments included two two-road engine sheds, built east of the station (1866) and north of the station. In 1899 a substantial eight-road engine shed was built east of the station.

In c.1973 an electric multiple unit maintenance depot (Note: Variously referred to as Hornsey E.M.U.D. (Hornsey Electric Multiple Unit Depot), Hornsey T&TRSMD, Hornsey EMU Depot, Hornsey Light Maintenance Depot, Hornsey LMD, or just Hornsey depot.) was constructed as part of the electrification of the Great Northern rail route.

A new train-wash and additional maintenance building for Class 700 units has been constructed on the site of the old Coronation sidings, together with an underframe cleaning building alongside the current shed.

== Site history ==
=== 1850 & 1866 GNR engine sheds ===
A two-road dead-ended shed was established by the Great Northern Railway (GNR) in 1850, on the east side of the station. The shed closed in 1866 when the nearby Wood Green shed had been built, and was later demolished; making way for expansion of Hornsey station. (Note: 51.586544°N 0.111438°W, Hornsey 1850-1866 shed.)

In 1866 another two-road dead-ended shed was established ("Wood Green shed"), ~1 km north of the station on the west side of the track adjacent to a new water works, and west of Wood Green common. The shed closed in 1899. (Note: 51.592419°N 0.11636°W, 1866-1899 shed.)

=== 1899 GNR eight-road engine shed ===
In 1899 an eight-track shed was constructed to the east of Hornsey station, together with a 52 ft (16 m) turntable, coal stage and water tank; the shed was connected via the Ferme Park sidings. (Note: 51.586475°N 0.109673°W, Hornsey 1899 shed.) The shed provided locos for shunting in the yard and nearby Ferme Park sidings, as well as goods workings across London to the south via Snow Hill tunnel. Hornsey locos shared suburban duties over the southern end of the GNR with locos from Kings Cross Top Shed.

Under British Railways the facility received the shed code 34B. The depot's initial allocation was primarily GNR Class N1s, GNR Class N2s and GNR Class J13s.

With the passing of steam, in 1961 the shed was converted for use with diesel traction, and continued in use until the early 1970s, closing in May 1971. The shed's duties were passed to nearby Finsbury Park diesel depot.

In 1973 the shed was converted for use as an Overhead Line (OHL) maintenance depot, as part of the works for the Great Northern electrification.

=== 1973 Great Northern electrification EMU depot ===
In the 1970s the site was extensively rebuilt; part of the Ferme Park sidings south of the shed was cleared, and a new Electric multiple unit depot constructed; (Note: 51.58448°N 0.108812°W, Hornsey EMU depot, 1975-) the work was done as part of the Great Northern electrification; a new maintenance shed was constructed with six roads, each capable of holding an eight-car train. At the same time the old loco shed was converted to use as an Overhead Line (OHL) maintenance depot, stabling an OHL repair train.

After 1973 the depot code became HE.

In 2008 First Capital Connect opened a 'Driver Training Academy' at the depot in 2008, equipped with British Rail Class 319 and Class 365 driving simulators. The simulators became operational in 2009.

=== 2016 Thameslink depot ===
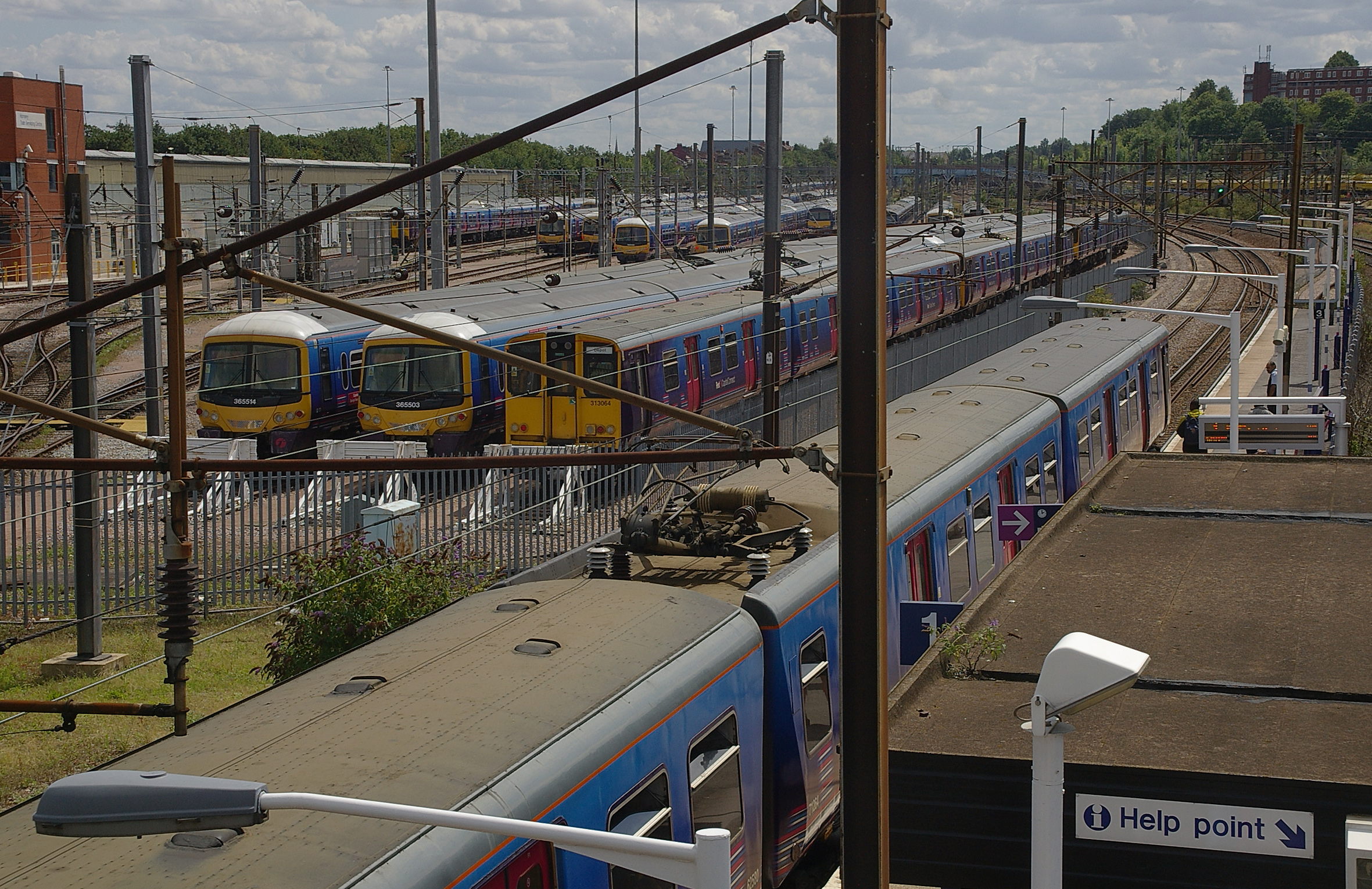
Hornsey EMU depot seen from the station footbridge

As part of the Thameslink Programme, it was decided that a large fleet of new trains, which were later named the Class 700, would be introduced on the Thameslink network.

In 2008, the Department for Transport commissioned a study into the location of depots for the future Thameslink rolling stock: Network Rail preferred two depots based on an expectation that at times the central area of the Thameslink route would be closed for maintenance outside commercial operational hours, with no workable alternative electrified routes available. A single-depot solution was also investigated, but no suitably large sites were identified for such a facility. Sites were considered at: Wellingborough; (Note: Including sidings used by GB Railfreight.) Hornsey; (Note: Adjacent to the existing Hornsey EMU depot then operated by First Capital Connect.) Cricklewood; (Note: On development land associated with the planned Brent Cross Thameslink railway station.) Selhurst; (Note: On the site of the existing Selhurst Depot used by Southern.) Three Bridges; (Note: A split site on either side of the Brighton Main Line.) and Tonbridge. By late 2008, the sites had been narrowed to Hornsey, Three Bridges and Tonbridge; finally Hornsey and Three Bridges were selected as a two-depot solution.

Network Rail submitted a planning application in August 2009.

The development was split across sites east of the main railway line: the main maintenance building was north of Hornsey railway station and the A504 road (High Street/Turnpike Lane); storage sidings were located south-east of Hornsey station, adjacent to the pre-existing depot. The northern site was on rail sidings ('Coronation sidings'/'Hornsey sidings') which had been developed on made embankments from the later 19th century to early 20th century; the southern stabling area was on land that had been extensively developed as railway sidings since the early 20th century. The proposed development required bridge widening of the crossing at Turnpike lane, and additional embankment work and extensions.

The main maintenance building was a six-road 40 by 280 m (130 by 920 ft), 13.4 m (44 ft) high single-ended train shed, with a train wash to the west and a two-storey 12 by 117 m (39 by 384 ft) warehouse adjacent to the east. The southern site included sidings for 11 twelve-car trains and 2 eight-car trains, with cleaning and controlled emission toilet facilities.

In 2009, John Denham, Secretary of State for Communities and Local Government blocked the development of the depot – the development had been subject to local and council objections on grounds including negative impact to a conservation area, as well as a potential negative impact to Haringey Council's "Haringey Heartlands" redevelopment project.

A revised two-depot plan was produced: the southern (Three Bridges) depot was expanded to a five-road shed, while estimates for total maintenance roads required had been reduced from nine to eight. The northern depot was required to be only a three-road depot; the depot was to be suitable for twelve-car trains, with wheel lathe, cleaning, warehousing and stabling facilities. Potential sites for the northern depot were reassessed and possible options reduced to three: a main depot at Coronation Sidings Hornsey; a main depot adjacent to the existing depot at Hornsey; and a site at Chesterton, Cambridge – a depot reduced in size on the site of the original plan was chosen as the best option for Network Rail.

The revised plan was submitted in 2011, with the main depot reduced approximately 2 m (6 ft 7 in) in height, and nearly half the area, and with estimated employment figures reduced from 270 to 120 people. Rail union RMT criticised the loss of employment opportunities due to the reduced scale of the plans, stating "Without anyone trying, Haringey has lost 150 jobs"; the revised scheme continued to produce significant opposition from local residents, with concerns including noise and light pollution during night working, as well as visual impact and traffic.

The main building was a 278 by 21.6 m (912 by 71 ft) three-road 11.3 m (37 ft) high single-ended shed, with a two-storey 182 by 12 m (597 by 39 ft) warehouse adjacent east, and a 50.6 by 6.5 m (166 by 21 ft) train-washing building adjacent west; facilities at the depot were to include equipment for heavy overhaul, with overhead synchronised lift cranes on one road. The southern site, adjacent to the pre-existing First Capital Connect (FCC) EMU depot, would include CET facilities, another 50.6 by 6.5 m (166 by 21 ft) train-washing building, a 260 by 7 m (853 by 23 ft) underfloor cleaning building, and shunter's cabins. Wheel-lathe facilities were to be shared with a pre-existing installation at the FCC depot. Existing sidings adjacent to the FCC depot were to be rebuilt to provide 16 roads – four arrival and departure roads, and 12 storage roads. Civil engineering work included bridge-widening across Turnpike Lane (A51) and a culverted waterway, as well as minor embankment works, and rebuilding of a footbridge at Hornsey station.

The plan was given permission in late 2011.

In mid-2013, VolkerFitzpatrick was awarded the approximately £150 million contract to build the two depots.

The depot officially opened on 13 December 2016.

== Modern facilities ==
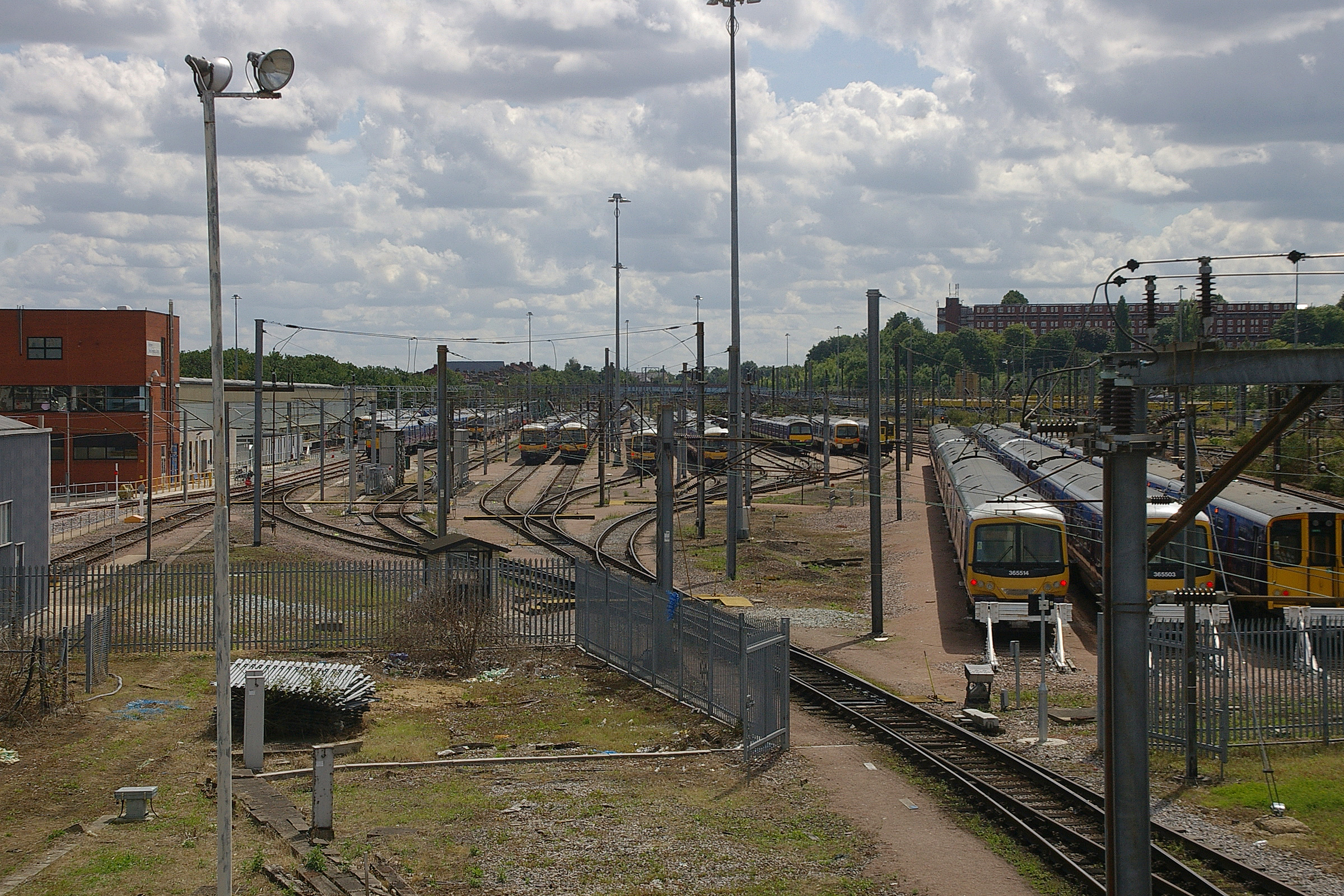
EMU maintenance building (left) and sidings. (2009)

Hornsey depot is currently an Electric Multiple Unit depot for Class 379, Class 387, and Class 717 units. These units are used on the Thameslink and Great Northern Routes, Thameslink units are brought to Hornsey for maintenance tasks such as wheel turning, which Hornsey Depot operated by Siemens on the other side of Hampden Road is unable to do. In 2025 Hornsey won a golden spanner award for the 387 fleet mostly due to its excellent record post AAA and A5 overhaul as completed by the Level 5 Heavy Maintenance team.

Hornsey depot operated by GTR is officially known as Hornsey TSC (Train Servicing Centre) whilst the Siemens facility is officially known as Hornsey Depot, or the MFB.

Facilities include a wheel lathe, large maintenance shed with lifting facilities and a train-washing plant, and extensive stabling sidings for Great Northern's commuter stock.
