= British Rail Class 700 =

Electric multiple unit in use on Thameslink

British Rail Class 700 Desiro City
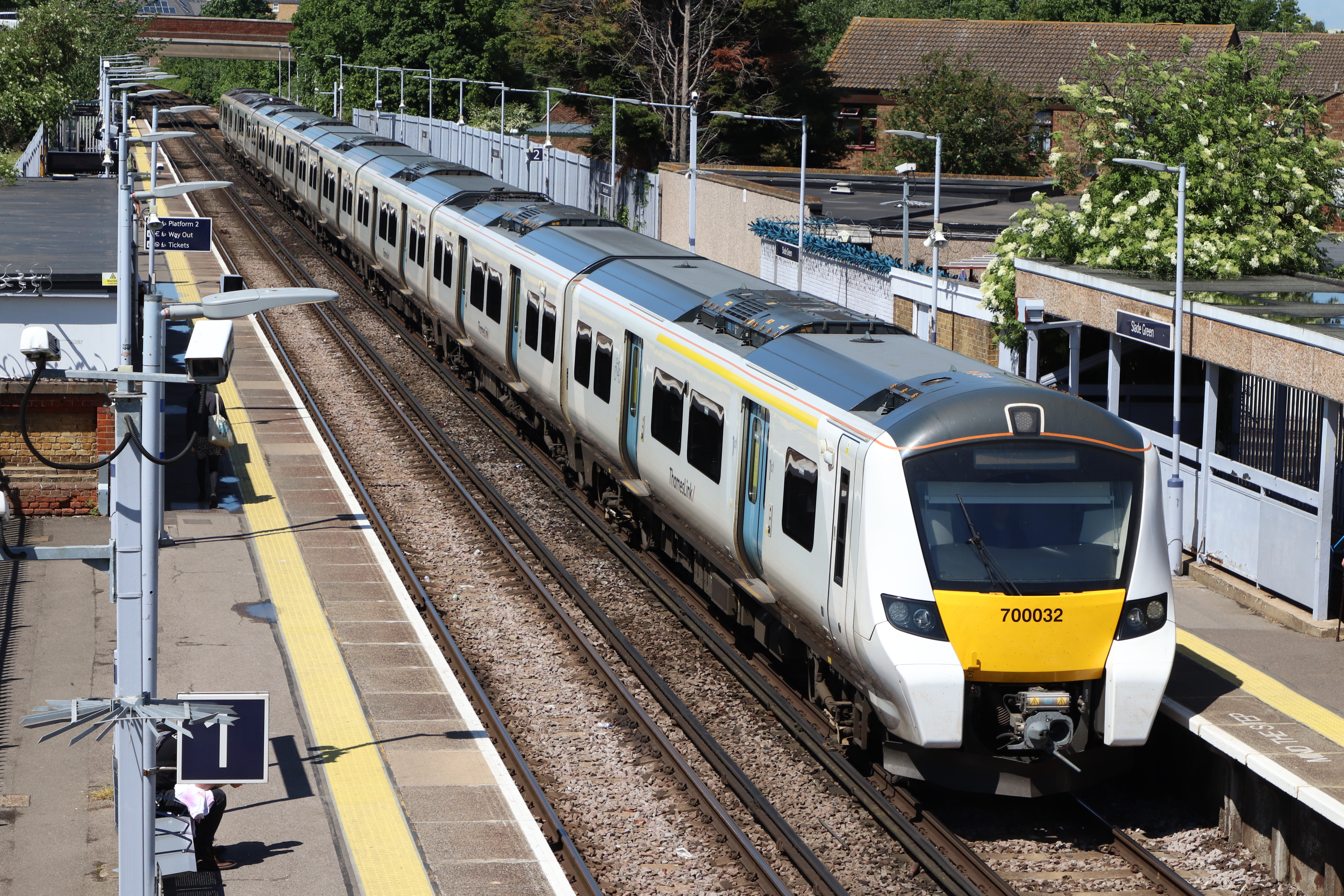
- A Thameslink Class 700 at Slade Green in 2022

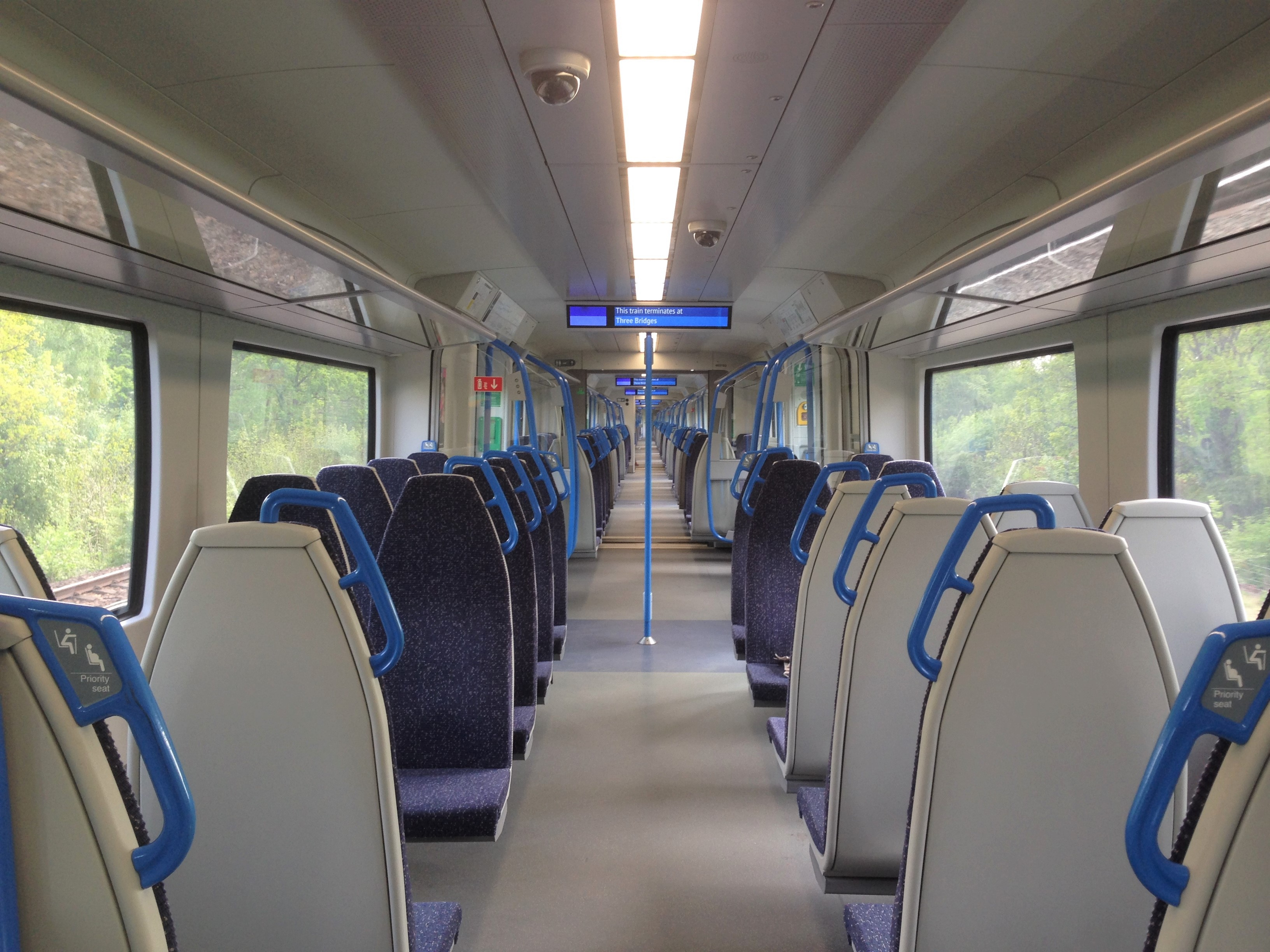
- The standard-class interior of a Class 700 unit
- In service: 20 June 2016 – present
- Manufacturer: Siemens Mobility
- Built at: Krefeld, Germany
- Family name: Desiro City
- Replaced: Class 319 (Thameslink); Class 365 (Great Northern); Class 377 (Thameslink); Class 387 (Thameslink)
- Constructed: 2014–2018
- Number built: 115
- Formation: 8 cars per 700/0 unit; 12 cars per 700/1 unit; (See § Fleet and formation details)
- Fleet numbers: 700/0: 700001–700060; 700/1: 700101–700155
- Capacity: 700/0: 427 seats (52F, 373S) plus 719 standees; 700/1: 666 seats (52F, 614S) plus 1088 standees
- Owner: Cross London Trains
- Operators: Current: Greater Thameslink Railway; Former: Govia Thameslink Railway
- Depots: Hornsey (London); Three Bridges (West Sussex)

Specifications
- Car body construction: Aluminium
- Train length: 700/0: 162.0 m (531 ft 6 in); 700/1: 242.6 m (795 ft 11 in)
- Car length: 20.2 m (66 ft 3 in)
- Width: 2.80 m (9 ft 2 in)
- Floor height: 1.10 m (43.31 in)
- Doors: Double-leaf pocket sliding; (2 per side per car)
- Wheel diameter: 820–760 mm (32.28–29.92 in) (new–worn)
- Wheelbase: Motor bogies: 2,200 mm (87 in); Trailer bogies: 2,100 mm (83 in)
- Maximum speed: 100 mph (160 km/h)
- Weight: 700/0 total: 278 t (274 long tons; 306 short tons); 700/1 total: 410 t (400 long tons; 450 short tons)
- Axle load: Motor bogies: 15.5 t (15.3 long tons; 17.1 short tons); Trailer bogies: 14.5 t (14.3 long tons; 16.0 short tons)
- Traction system: Siemens IGBT-VVVF
- Power output: 700/0: 3,300 kW (4,400 hp); 700/1: 5,000 kW (6,700 hp)
- Electric systems: 25 kV 50 Hz AC overhead; 750 V DC third rail
- Current collection: Pantograph (AC); Contact shoe (DC)
- UIC classification: (See § Fleet and formation details)
- Bogies: Siemens SGP SF7000
- Minimum turning radius: 120 m (390 ft)
- Braking systems: Electro-pneumatic (disc) and regenerative
- Safety systems: AWS; ATO; ETCS; TPWS
- Coupling system: Dellner
- Track gauge: 1,435 mm (4 ft 8 1/2 in) standard gauge

Notes/references
- Sourced from unless otherwise noted.

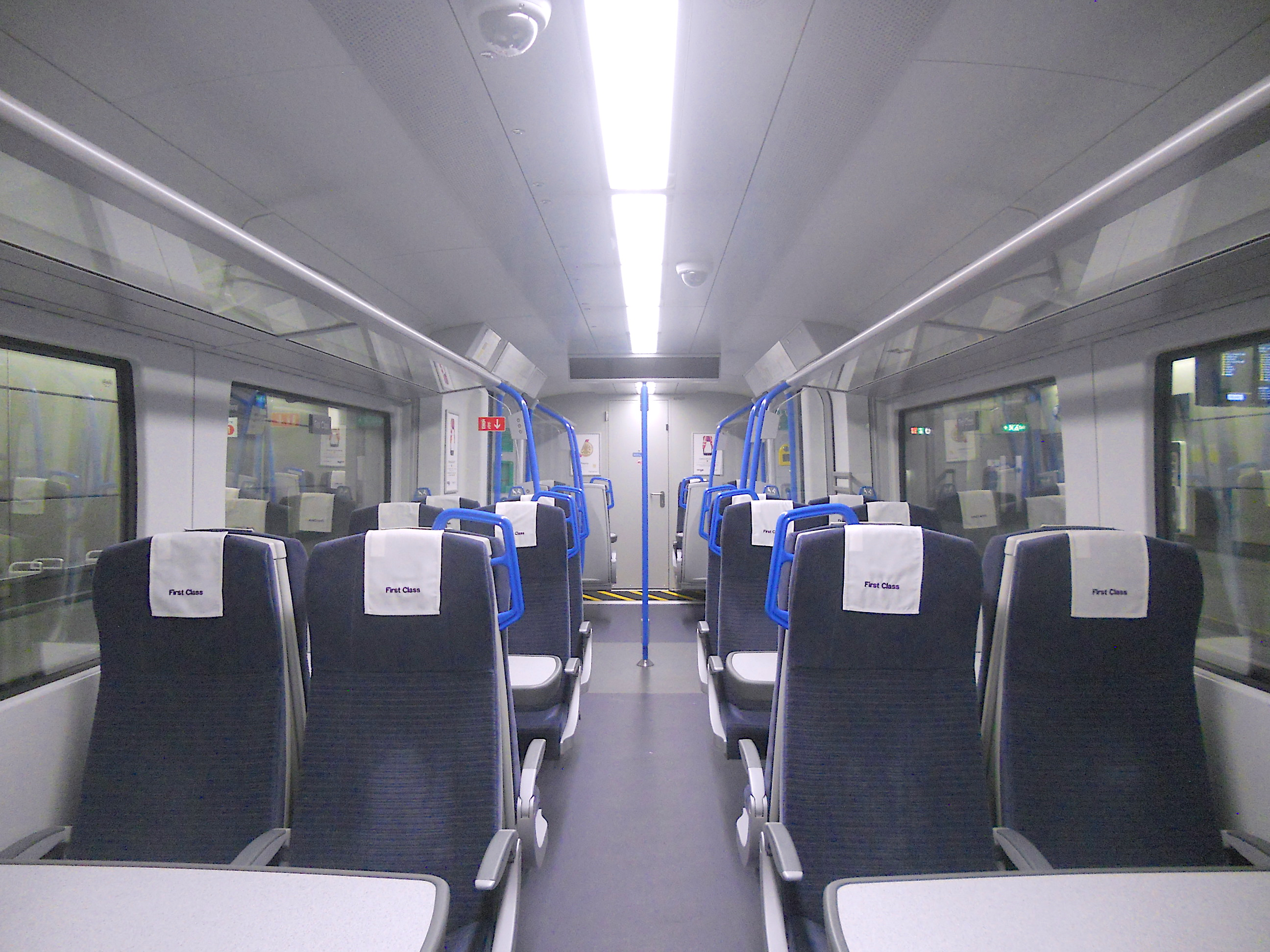
The interior of First Class cabin aboard a Thameslink Class 700

The British Rail Class 700 Desiro City is an electric multiple unit passenger train from the Desiro City family built by Siemens Mobility. It is capable of operating on 25 kV 50 Hz AC from overhead wires or 750 V DC from third rail. 115 trainsets were built between 2014 and 2018, for use on the Thameslink network, as part of the Thameslink Programme in the United Kingdom. As of 2026, they are operated by Greater Thameslink Railway.

In 2011, the consortium Cross London Trains (XLT) consisting of Siemens Project Ventures, 3i Infrastructure, and Innisfree was announced as preferred bidder with Siemens Mobility to manufacture the trains. The decision was politically controversial as the trains were to be built in Germany, while the competing consortium led by Bombardier Transportation had a UK train factory. Both the procurement process and final close of contract were significantly delayed, resulting in the expected first delivery date moving from 2012 to 2016. The £1.6 billion contract to manufacture and provide service depots for the trains was finalised in June 2013. The first train was delivered in late July 2015.

A fleet of 60 eight-car and 55 twelve-car trains entered service between spring 2016 and 2019. Having replaced Class 319s, 377s, and 387s, the Class 700 is the only class operated on the Thameslink network. Each train is able to reach 100 mph (160 km/h) and carry 1,146 passengers in an eight-car train, and 1,754 passengers in a 12-car train. Maintenance depots have been built at Hornsey and Three Bridges.

== Procurement ==
=== Announcement ===
The Department for Transport began its procurement process (Thameslink Rolling Stock Project, or Thameslink Rolling stock Programme) on 9 April 2008, with the aim of introducing more passenger capacity on Thameslink lines to match expected demand. In addition, the bidders were to provide depots for vehicle maintenance and storage and finance for the rolling-stock project whereby revenues would be generated from the long-term leasing of rolling stock to the train operating company and associated maintenance payments.

The general specifications included: high reliability, short station dwell times, integrated information technology including passenger information and information for vehicle maintenance, a top speed of 100 mph (160 km/h), and high acceleration and deceleration performance in line with a high-frequency timetable. (Note: Up to 24 trains per hour in central London.) The trains were to be designed for low weight, low track forces, and high energy efficiency. A standard 12-car train was to be about 240 metres (790 ft) long and shorter eight-car trains were limited to 162 metres (531 ft).

The passenger accommodation was to include versions for both "metro" and "commuter" trains, (Note: The 240 m (790 ft) long trains were expected to be of "outer-suburban" or "commuter" type, while the 162 m (531 ft) trains were expected to have both "metro" and "suburban" passenger accommodation types.) based around a 2+2 seating arrangement, with fold-up seats and designed for high levels of standing passengers. Ride quality and noise levels were expected to equal or be better than those of current vehicles and climate control (air-conditioning) was to be fitted. The vehicles were to be fitted for driver-only operation, and to include GSM-R communications radio, as well as AWS, TPWS, and ERTMS level 2 safety systems. The ability to be used in 'Automatic train operation' (ATO) mode, where an on-board computer controls the motors and brakes, was also specified.

Vehicles were to operate on 750 V DC and 25 kV AC electrification systems, with regenerative brakes. Maintenance time was to be reduced by the use of modular components, remote diagnostics, and the avoidance of over-complicated systems. The Department for Transport gave a target of 384 tonnes (378 long tons; 423 short tons) when empty for a 243 m (797 ft) train.

=== Bids ===
In July 2008, the Department for Transport shortlisted consortia including Alstom, Bombardier, Hitachi, and Siemens as train builders. The invitations to tender were issued to the four bidders in November 2008.

Hitachi exited the bidding process in April 2009.

In July 2009, Siemens unveiled the Desiro City, a development of design and technology used in its Desiro UK range and the Desiro Mainline range. Development of the design had begun in 2007, with an investment of about £45 million.

In September 2009, Alstom unveiled the X'trapolis UK, unusually an articulated vehicle, using 15.6 m (51 ft) cars, with individual carriages proposed to be supported at one end by a bogie and at the opposite end by a linkage to the next carriage. The shorter vehicle allowed a slightly wider design; the smaller number of bogies was to have resulted in a train approximately 40 tonnes lighter than a conventional design. However, the design would have resulted in a higher axle load. The bid was rejected in October 2009.

Bombardier Transportation offered the Aventra, a design incorporating a development of the FLEXX Eco inside frame bogie with bogie-mounted traction motors.

Both Bombardier's and Siemens' rolling-stock designs were conventional EMUs incorporating inside frame bogies and modern passenger and rolling stock information systems.

=== Contract decision and financial close ===
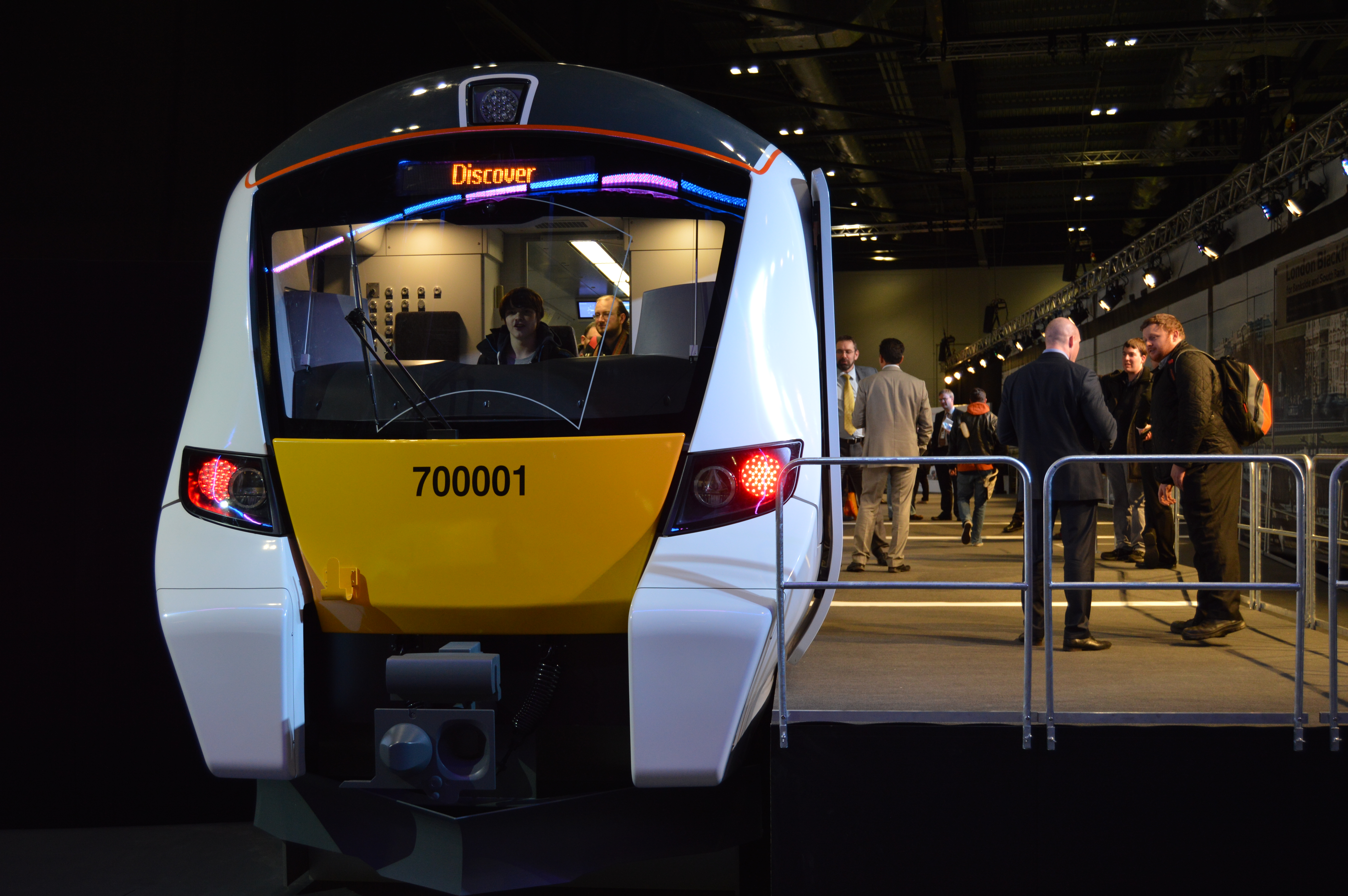
Full size mock-up of the Class 700 at ExCeL

The contract for the order was originally planned to be signed in summer 2009, with the first vehicles in service by February 2012, and squadron service by 2015. The award of the contract was delayed by the 2010 general election and the subsequent spending review, following which the procurement was announced to be proceeding in late 2010.

On 16 June 2011, Cross London Trains Ltd, a consortium formed by Siemens Project Ventures GmbH, Innisfree Ltd., and 3i Infrastructure Ltd., was named preferred bidder for the PFI contract, and the targeted entry of trains into service was rescheduled to 2015–2018. The vehicles would be manufactured at Siemens' plant in Krefeld, Germany, and maintenance depots were to be built at Hornsey (London) and Three Bridges (Sussex).

The contract was significantly delayed: initially Siemens had hoped to reach agreement in early 2012; by late 2012 commercial close was hoped for by the end of the year, and financial close in early 2013. Key aspects of the commercial contract were reported to have been finalised by December 2012.

As a result of the delays to the procurement, in late 2012, train operating company Southern began procurement of 116 dual-voltage Class 387 EMU vehicles (29 units) from Bombardier that would be used temporarily on the Thameslink route until 2015; the order contract was finalised in July 2013.

In mid-2013 the National Audit Office (NAO) reported that the contract delay could negatively impact the delivery of the entire Thameslink Programme.

The £1.6 billion contract to finance, supply, and maintain a 1,140-carriage fleet of passenger rolling stock was eventually finalised between the DfT, the supplier Siemens, and the Cross London Trains consortium on 14 June 2013.

To finance the work, loans were arranged with nineteen banks, with Lloyds, Sumitomo Mitsui Banking Corporation, KfW and BTMU acting as mandated lead arrangers; the European Investment Bank also provided a debt facility. Loans for the construction of the rolling-stock depots were through Siemens Financial Services.

== Design and manufacturing ==
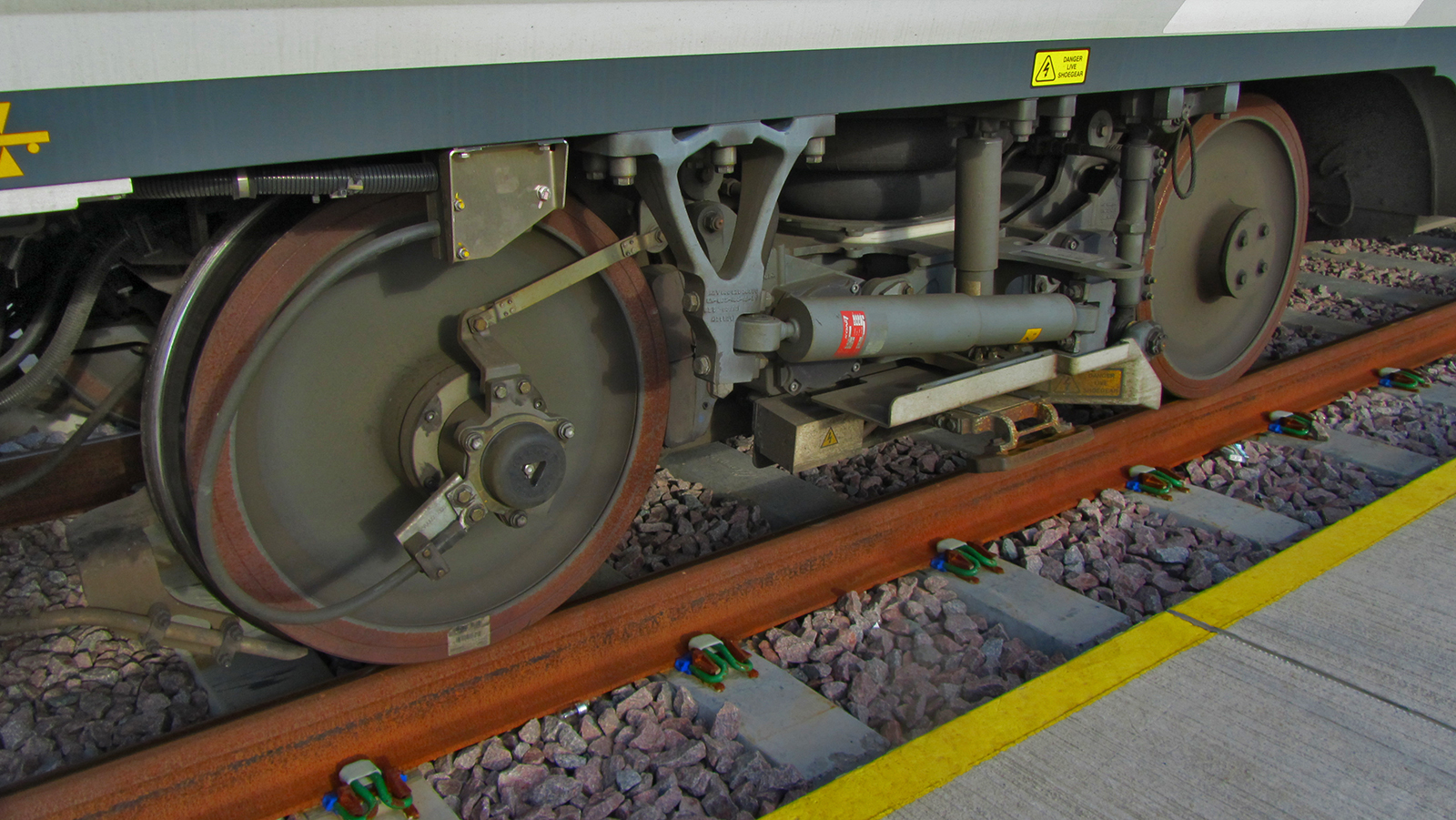
Class 700 powered bogie

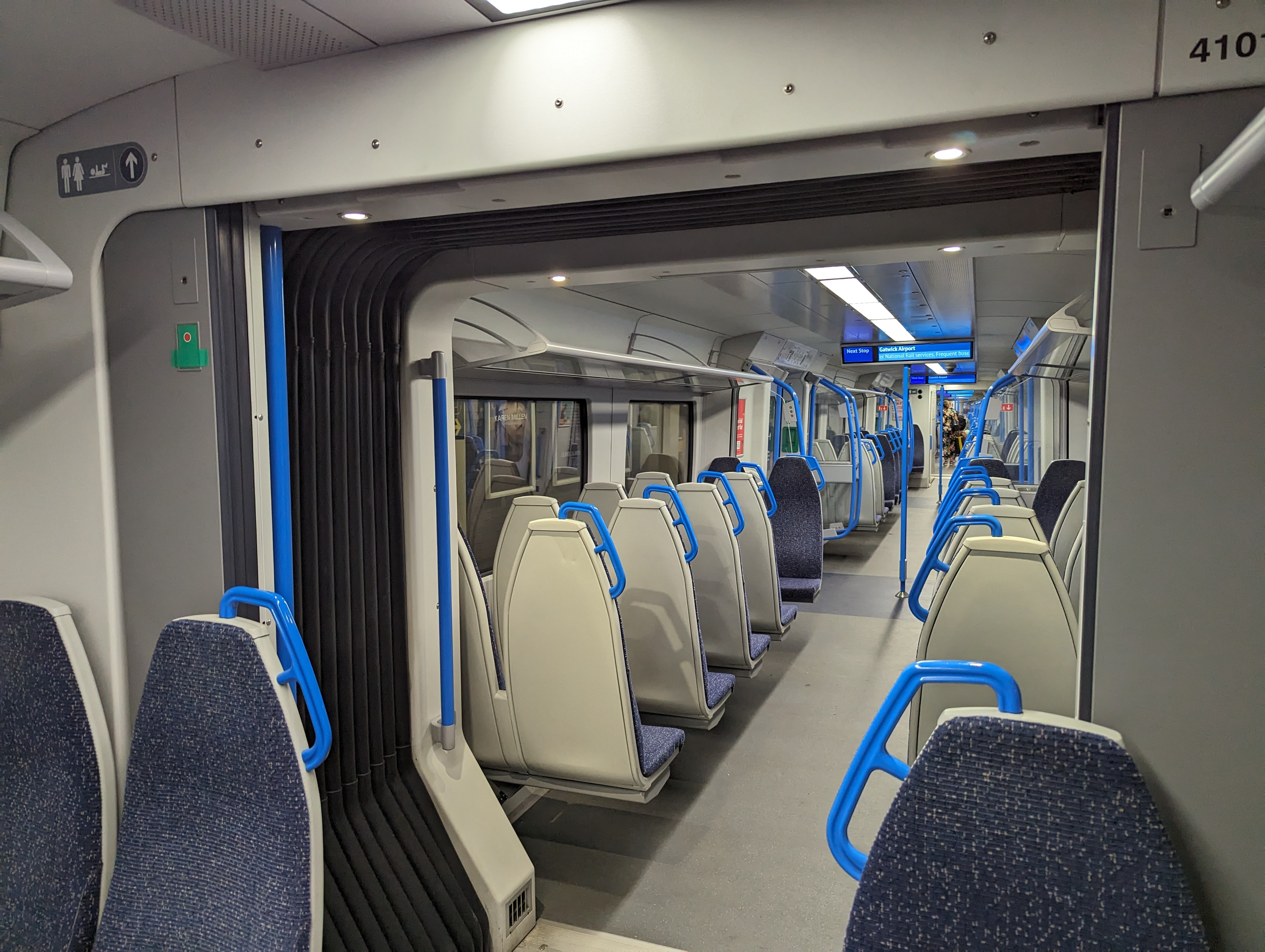
Some walk-through coach gangways on the Class 700 offer manually controlled sliding doors to close off certain parts of the train

Development of the new SF7000 bogie began in 2007, with the intention that it would be the UK-market replacement for the preceding Siemens SGP SF5000 model. To reduce energy consumption and track access charges, a key feature of the design was reduced weight: weight-saving design elements included short wheelbase, inboard frames, a bolsterless bogie design, and hollow axles. Total bogie weight is 6.3 tonnes (powered) and 4.4 tonnes (trailer), a reduction of around one third from the SF5000 design.

The primary suspension system uses layered rubber, with pneumatic secondary suspension. Motor bogies have a wheelbase of 2,200 mm (87 in), while trailer bogies are 100 mm (3.9 in) shorter. Both variants use wheels of 820 mm (32 in) nominal diameter. Braking is by tread brakes and regenerative braking on motor bogies, and two axle-mounted disc brakes per axle on trailer bogies.

Prototypes of the new bogie were completed at Siemens' bogie plant in Graz, Austria in late 2011.

Manufacture of pre-series production trainsets began before formal financial close of the project in mid-2013.

A mock-up of the train was unveiled at the ExCel centre in January 2014, and then displayed at various stations in London and the surrounding area.

In March 2014, testing of a 12-car unit began at the Wegberg-Wildenrath Test and Validation Centre; a completed unit was presented by Siemens in Krefeld, Germany in April 2015.

== Introduction into service ==
The first train arrived in the UK by the end of July 2015, and was delivered to the Three Bridges depot. The first test run on the Brighton Main Line took place in December 2015.

The first train in service was unit 700108 forming the 1002 Brighton to London Bridge service on 20 June 2016. By 18 September 2017, Class 700s replaced all Class 319, 377, and 387 units previously in use on the network. All units were accepted by Thameslink by summer 2018, and by the end of 2019 all were in passenger service.

The Class 700 fleet, at 60 eight-car and 55 twelve-car units, is over double the size of the old Thameslink fleet. This increase has been used not only to enhance capacity, but also to expand the Thameslink network.

On 6 November 2017, Class 700s started on the Great Northern route with the first, 700128, operating the 0656 Peterborough to London Kings Cross service. The Great Northern route has since been partially incorporated in the Thameslink network after through services through the Canal Tunnels began on 26 February 2018. On this route, Class 700s replaced parts of the Class 365 fleet.

On 11 December 2017, Class 700s took over peak-time services from London Bridge to Littlehampton and weekday-only services from London Bridge to Horsham from Southern with the former starting from Bedford instead of London Bridge.

From 21 May 2018, Class 700s also entered service on the new Rainham to Luton service, having replaced the Southeastern Class 465s from Gillingham to London Charing Cross. The Class 465s are now being used to enhance capacity on other routes.

Class 700s are still due to enter service on a planned new service between Cambridge and Maidstone East but a date for this has not yet been confirmed.

== Criticism ==
=== Procurement ===
Because the trains were to be built outside the UK, the decision to award the contract to Siemens proved controversial: there was widespread criticism of the UK government's bidding process and perceived lack of support for British manufacturing, which in turn led to a review of governmental procurement mechanisms. Additionally, the decision to procure a train with a new bogie design untested in the UK was challenged by several observers at a parliamentary investigation into the train procurement; rival bidder Bombardier already had a proven low-weight bogie.

In 2014, the NAO reported on the Department for Transport's handling of Intercity Express and Thameslink rolling-stock procurement projects. The report questioned the DfT's attempt to take leadership in the project, contrary to general policy, without any prior experience of large-scale rolling stock procurement; the NAO also said the DfT had handled communications with bidders poorly, increasing the likelihood of a legal challenge to its decisions.

=== Interior design ===
The Class 700 units have been criticised for having fewer seats than those they replaced. There are 666 seats on the 12-car versions of the Class 700, compared to 714 on a 12-car formation of a Thameslink Class 377/5 and 807 on a twelve car formation of a Great Northern Class 365. The reduction in the number of seats is intended to provide more standing room on busy trains into Central London, but has been criticised by those who use the trains for longer journeys. There will, however, be more seats overall, as the services will run more frequently.

Additionally, the seats themselves have been criticised for being an uncomfortable shape and having insufficient padding. They are also narrow and positioned close together – another design intended to increase standing space. These poor levels of comfort, along with their tall, thin, tapered appearance, have led them to sometimes be nicknamed "ironing boards"; they have also been likened to sitting on concrete.

Thameslink have claimed that the lack of padding was required to meet fire regulations; however, the Rail Safety and Standards Board have claimed that this is untrue, and that it was simply a measure by the DfT to reduce costs.

Upon delivery, the trains were also missing various amenities which were considered standard, including seatback tables and Wi-Fi, which are now being retrofitted to some units. As of April 2023, 58% of Class 700/1 (12 coach) and 23% of Class 700/0 (8 coach) are fitted with Wi-Fi with no plans to extend this further across the fleet. They also lack at-seat power points, having neither plug sockets nor USB ports for passengers to charge their devices.

== Fleet and formation details ==
The new fleet were allocated TOPS classification '700' in 2013. This was divided into subclasses 700/0 for eight-car units and 700/1 for 12-car units.

The first class compartment at the rear of each unit is declassified at all times.

In July 2013 Eversholt Rail entered into an agreement with Cross London Trains to provide long-term (22-year) asset management for the fleet of trains.

There are 60 eight-car units and 55 twelve-car units. Each is a fixed length continuously gangwayed vehicle. The initial livery is "light grey with pastel blue doors and a white diagonal flash at the carriage ends".

Subclass	Operator	Qty.	Year built	Cars per unit	Unit nos.	Formation & UIC classification
700/0	Greater Thameslink Railway	60	2014–2018	8	700001–700060	DMCO-PTSO-MSO-TSOW-TSOLW-MSO-PTSO-DMCO; Bo′Bo′+2′2′+Bo′Bo′+2′2′+2′2′+Bo′Bo′+2′2′+Bo′Bo′
700/1	Greater Thameslink Railway	55	2014–2018	12	700101–700155	DMCO-PTSO-MSO-MSO-TSO-TSOW-TSOLW-TSO-MSO-MSO-PTSO-DMCO; Bo′Bo′+2′2′+Bo′Bo′+Bo′Bo′+2′2′+2′2′+2′2′+2′2′+Bo′Bo′+Bo′Bo′+2′2′+Bo′Bo′

=== Illustrations ===
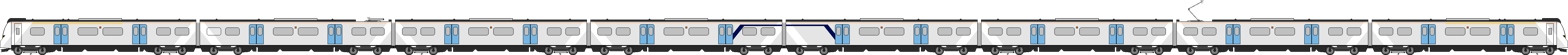
Illustration of a Thameslink Class 700/0 unit
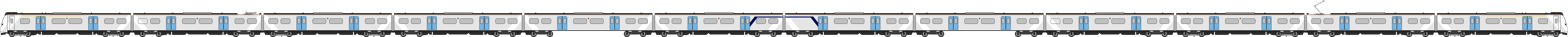
Illustration of a Thameslink Class 700/1 unit

=== Special liveries ===
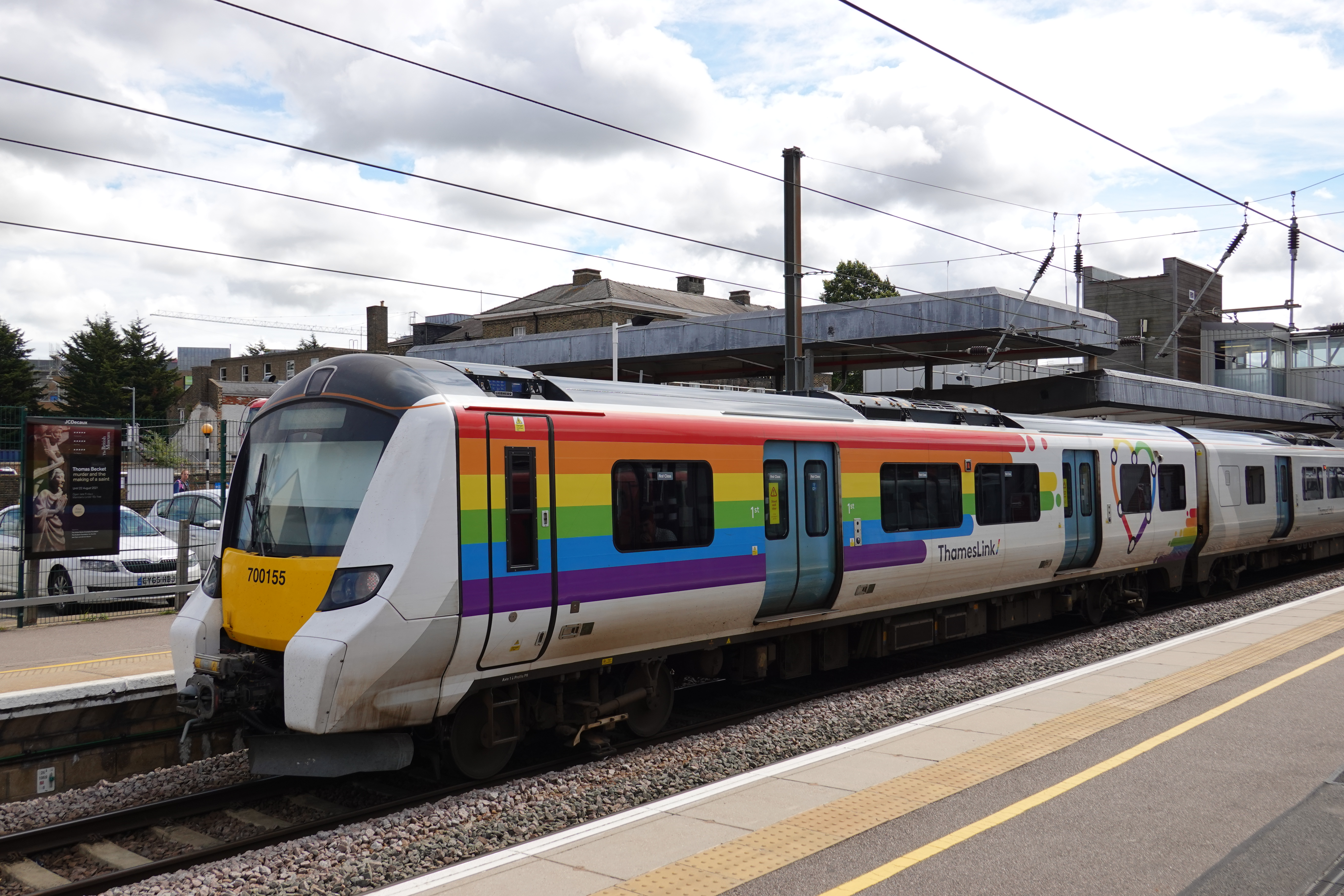
Unit 700155 in its LGBTQ+ pride "Trainbow" livery

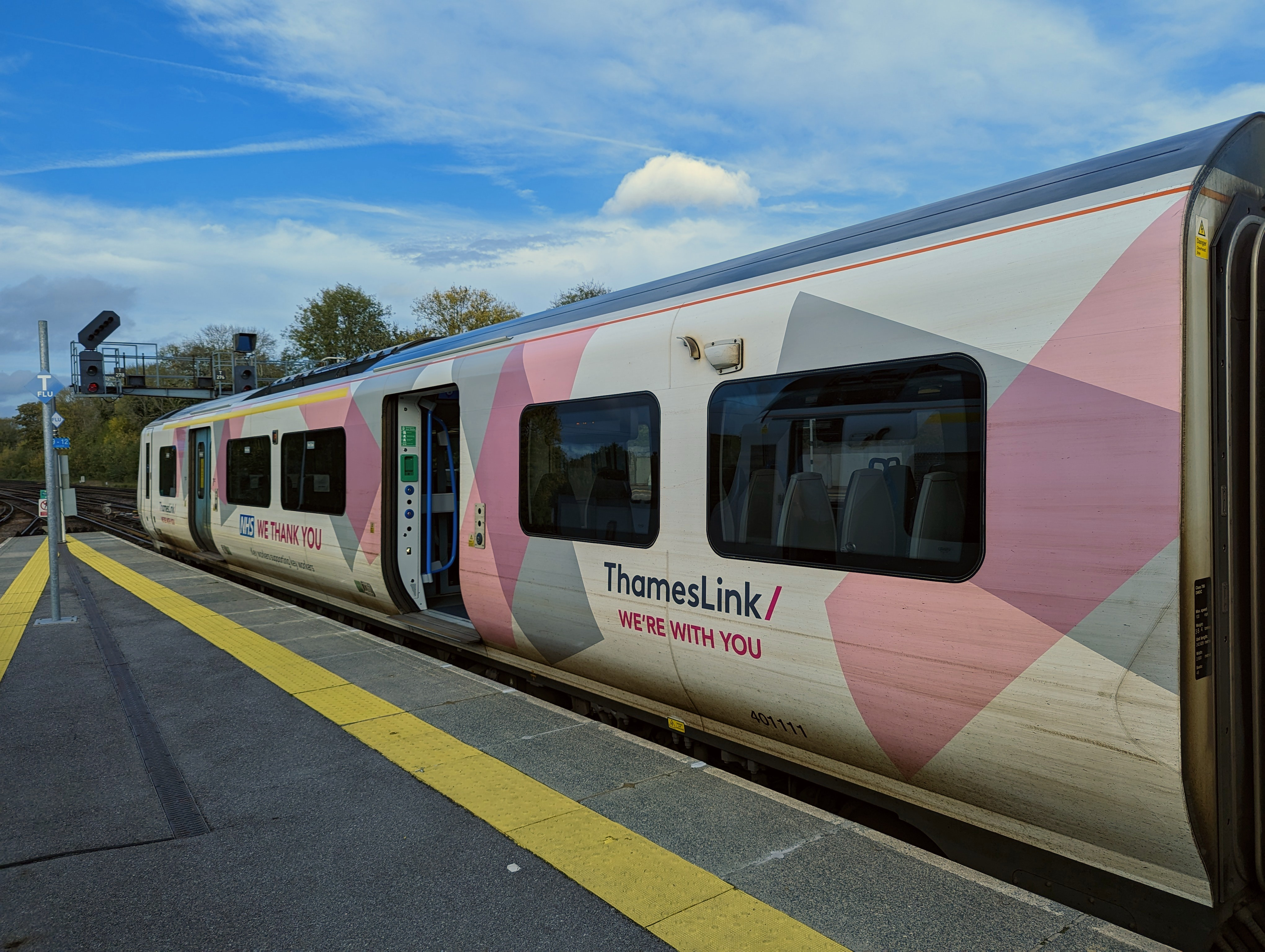
Unit 700111 in its "NHS We Thank You" livery

In July 2019, unit 700155 was wrapped with vinyl trainbow stickers to celebrate LGBT Pride and to mark Brighton's annual pride event.

As of April 2020, unit 700111, alongside Southern unit 377111 and Great Northern unit 717011, has been wrapped with a special NHS appreciation livery to show support for the NHS and the 200,000 essential commuters travelling on Govia Thameslink Railway's network each week during the nationwide lockdown caused by the COVID-19 pandemic.

=== Named units ===
Unit 700124 is named Driver Phil Marchant Keeping us moving for more than 12 years

== Depots ==
In 2008, the Department for Transport commissioned a study into the location of depots for the future Thameslink rolling stock: Network Rail preferred two depots based on an expectation that at times the central area of the Thameslink route would be closed for maintenance outside commercial operational hours, with no workable alternative electrified routes available; as a result, depots on either side of the central Thameslink area were required, enabling trains to reach a depot on a nightly basis without passing through central London. A single-depot solution was also investigated, but no suitably large sites were identified for such a facility. Sites were considered at: Wellingborough; (Note: Including sidings used by GB Railfreight.) Hornsey; (Note: Adjacent to the existing Hornsey EMU depot then operated by First Capital Connect.) Cricklewood; (Note: On development land associated with the planned Brent Cross Thameslink railway station.) Selhurst; (Note: On the site of the existing Selhurst Depot used by Southern.) Three Bridges; (Note: A split site on either side of the main line.) and Tonbridge. By late 2008, the sites had been narrowed to Hornsey, Three Bridges and Tonbridge; finally Hornsey and Three Bridges were selected as a two-depot solution.

In August 2009, planning applications for both sites were submitted by Arup acting on behalf of Network Rail. However, in December, the Hornsey application was blocked by Secretary of State for Communities and Local Government John Denham on grounds of its scale. Potential sites for the northern depot were reassessed and possible options reduced to three: a main depot at Coronation Sidings Hornsey; a main depot adjacent to the existing depot at Hornsey; and a site at Chesterton, Cambridge – a depot reduced in size on the site of the original plan was chosen as the best option for Network Rail. In 2011 revised plans were submitted for both the Hornsey and Three Bridges schemes, with the Hornsey scheme reduced in size and the Three Bridges scheme expanded. In mid-2013, VolkerFitzpatrick was awarded the approximately £150 million contract to build the two depots.

The Three Bridges and the Hornsey depots were officially opened in October 2015 and December 2016 respectively.

The Three Bridges depot is located 0.93 mi (1.5 km) south of Three Bridges railway station on either side of the Brighton Main Line. (Note: Located in the 'fork' between the Brighton Main Line (L&BR 1841), the Arun Valley line (LB&SCR 1848), and the now-closed Three Bridges–Tunbridge Wells line (EGR 1855), the site had historically been used for railway use, having been unbuilt on prior to railway developments; by 1910 sidings had been built east of the Brighton Main Line, as well as an engine shed and turntable adjacent west of the site; in 2008 the western development area comprised underused sidings and hardstanding with the site east of the mainline including operation sidings, as well as offices; tenants included English Welsh & Scottish Railway, BAM Nuttall, Colas Rail and Balfour Beatty.) The Hornsey depot is located on the east side of the East Coast Main Line near Hornsey railway station, split between the north-east and the south-east of the station and the A504 road (High Street/Turnpike Lane), the latter being adjacent to the pre-existing depot. (Note: The northern site, in which the main maintenance building is located, is on rail sidings ('Coronation sidings'/'Hornsey sidings') which had been developed on made embankments from the later 19th century to early 20th century; the southern stabling area was on land that had been extensively developed as railway sidings since the early 20th century.)

== Accidents and incidents ==
- Sixty Thameslink Class 700 and 717 trains failed during disturbances to the National Grid on 9 August 2019 during which the grid frequency fell to 48.914 Hz. Govia Thameslink Railway reported that their Class 700 and Class 717 trains that were operating on AC power were affected by the frequency deviation below 49 Hz. Half were restarted by the drivers but the others required a technician to come out to the train to restart it. Thousands of passengers had their journeys delayed with 371 trains cancelled, 220 part cancelled, and 873 trains delayed. London St Pancras and King's Cross stations had to close for several hours due to overcrowding.
  The DNOs confirmed that no track supplies were lost due to the grid disturbance, instead the problem was with the train software. By design, the train driver should have been able to restart the train and continue in service. However, an unforeseen condition in the train software meant that some trains could not be reset until attended to by a technician with a laptop.
- On 18 February 2022, during Storm Eunice, unit 700153 collided with a tree obstructing the line at Ifield, West Sussex and was derailed.
- On 9 June 2023, unit 700042 was derailed at Plumstead.

== See also ==
- British Rail Class 707 – a version of the Desiro City platform in service with Southeastern.
- British Rail Class 717 – a version of the Desiro City platform in service for Great Northern.
