= Trainbow =

LGBT marketing concept by train operating companies

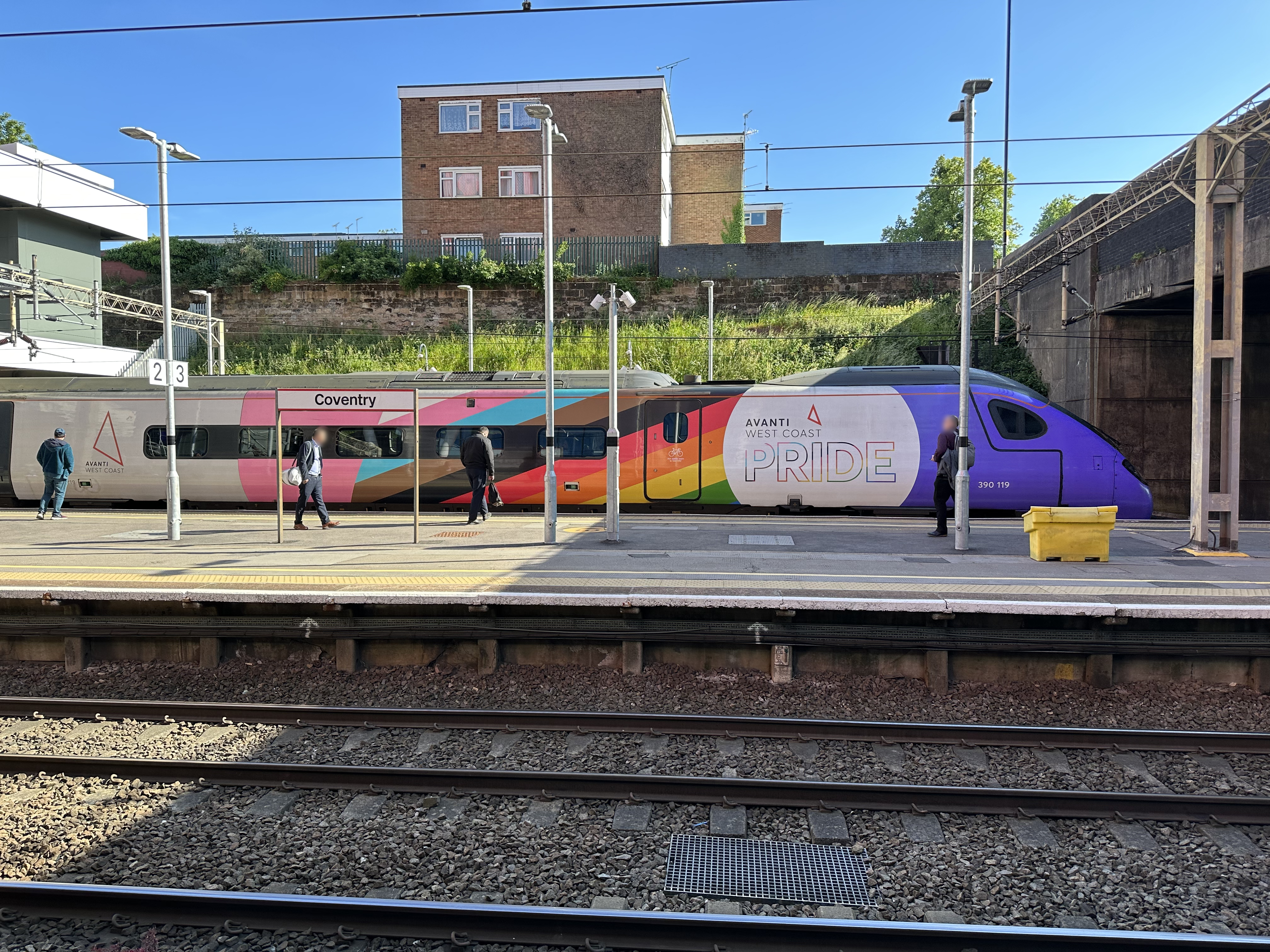
A notable trainbow, the Avanti West Coast Progress train

Trainbow is the nickname that is given to the LGBT marketing concept by train operating companies, initially in the United Kingdom, of covering their trains and carriages in rainbows or pride flags. The word is a portmanteau of the words "train" and "rainbow".

== History ==
The trainbow was started by Transport for London in June 2015 by decorating two DLR B92 trains for Pride in London, after previously doing it on a Routemaster bus and a London taxi under the phrase "Ride with Pride". After the success of the interest in rainbow-decorated light rail carriages, other train operating companies started decorating trains in rainbow colours and LGBT symbols, notably starting in 2018. Later, the hashtag #trainbow came out on Twitter as a reference to these rainbow-coloured trains.

Class 801 "Azuma" No.801226 in Pride Together livery at Northallerton in November 2024

Notable trainbows include a GWR Class 800 IET Alan Turing, serial number 800008, which has rainbow stripes on the front, the Avanti West Coast Class 390 Pendolino Progress, serial number 390119, the first one that is covered from end-to-end in pride colours, and the LNER Class 801 Azuma Together, serial number 801226, which has multiple stripes based on various pride flags.

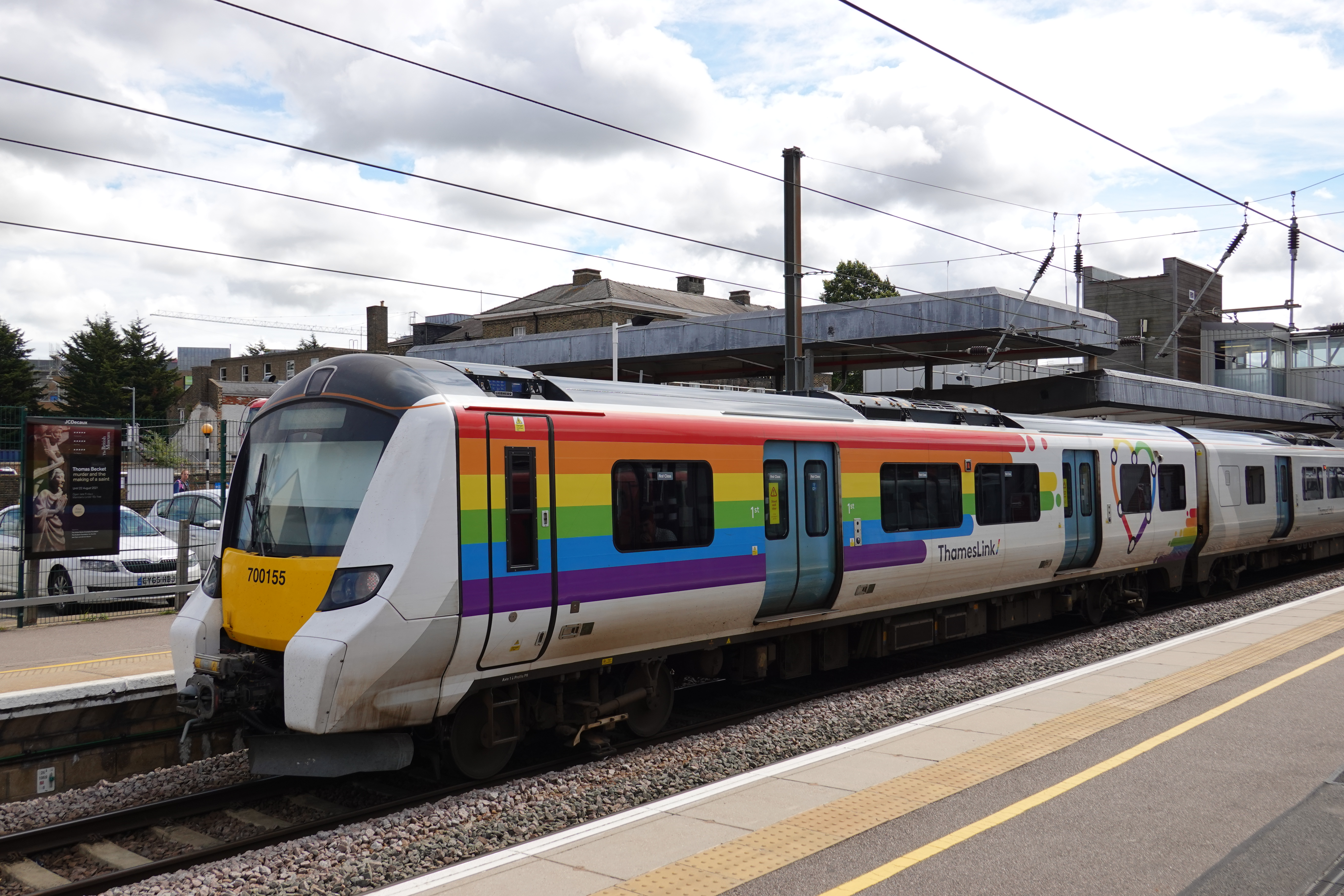
Thameslink's trainbow-liveried Class 700

As of May 2024, the only British train operating companies (TOCs) that have not had trainbows are: Northern, Transport for Wales Rail, Hull Trains, Merseyrail, Grand Central, Caledonian Sleeper and Eurostar. When enquired, TfW Rail has said it has no plans to introduce trainbows on its train in the near future. In May 2024, West Midlands Trains decorated a Class 730 Aventra (serial number 730018), while Cross Country introduced a trainbow on one of its Class 220 Voyager (serial number 220005) and a Class 170 Turbostar (serial number 170618) as part of Birmingham Pride.

Trainbows have since expanded to other nations, starting in 2019, when France's SNCF wrapped a TGV inOui Euroduplex locomotive in rainbow colours to celebrate 50 years of Pride. In June 2022, as part of the celebration of Dublin Pride, Ireland's Iarnród Éireann wrapped a CIÉ 8100 Class DART commuter train (serial number 8315). In Belgium, in June 2023, a number of SNCB carriages of a SNCB Class 08 Desiro (serial number AM08 8586), had rainbow wrappings celebrating IDAHOBIT and Brussels Pride.

Germany has a number of trains which have been wrapped with rainbow decals. It first started in July 2021 with an ICE 3 nicknamed Rainbow Train (serial number 403 504-4), having its famous red stripe replaced with a rainbow stripe to celebrate the tenth anniversary of Deutsche Bahn's LGBT+ employee network, railbow.

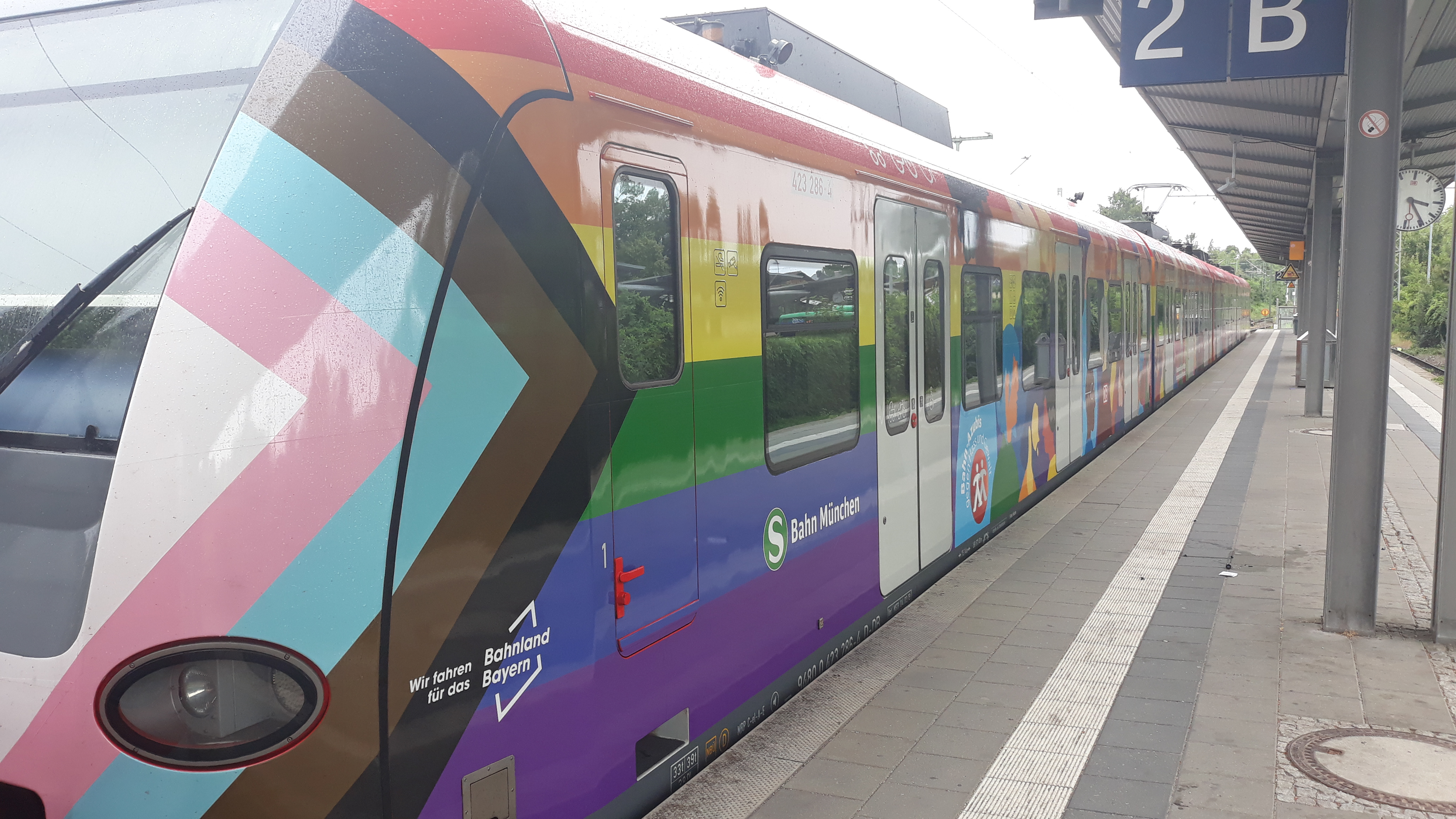
A German trainbow, a decorated Deutsche Bahn Class 423

Trainbows were immortalised in miniature form in August 2023 when Hornby Railways began selling a miniature version of the GWR's Alan Turing train.

While NI Railways wrapped two NIR Class 3000 units with trainbows (serial numbers 3006 and 3021) in April 2020, they are dedicated to the local health service instead of LGBT causes as part of a COVID-19-related marketing campaign called #ChaseTheRainbow.

== Trainbow units ==
Train	Image	Unit number	Operator	Date	Name	Ref.
Trainbow trains (UK)
Class 158 Express Sprinter		158 773	East Midlands Railway			
Class 170 Turbostar		170 501	East Midlands Railway	September 2024	Let’s Roll with Pride	
Class 170 Turbostar		170 618	CrossCountry	May 2024		
Class 170 Turbostar		170 103	CrossCountry	September 2025	Journey with Pride	
Class 220 Voyager		220 005	CrossCountry	May 2024		
Class 334 Coradia Juniper		334 006	ScotRail	22 June 2021		
Class 345 Aventra		345 055	Elizabeth line	30 June 2023	Every Story Matters	
Class 378 Capitalstar		378 205	London Overground	26 June 2023	Every Story Matters	
Class 390 Pendolino		390 119	Avanti West Coast	25 August 2020	Progress	
Class 395 Javelin		395 012	Southeastern	23 January 2021		
Class 444 Desiro		444 019	South Western Railway	27 March 2023		
Class 700 Desiro City		700 155	Thameslink	18 July 2019		
Class 720 Aventra		720 506	Greater Anglia	20 November 2023		
Class 730/0 Landmark		730 018	West Midlands Trains	23 May 2024	Hurst Street	
Class 755 FLIRT		755 421	Greater Anglia	4 April 2024		
Class 800 IET		800 008	Great Western Railway	7 June 2018	Alan Turing	
Class 801 Azuma		801 226	London North Eastern Railway	1 June 2023	Together	
Class 803		803 003	Lumo	16 June 2023	Pride Partnerships	
Trainbow trains (EU)

== Influence on other transport ==
Since the creation of trainbows, other forms of transport in the UK, including regional buses, and even a Loganair Embraer 145 plane, have marked Pride.
