= Three Bridges railway station =

Railway station in West Sussex, England

Three Bridges
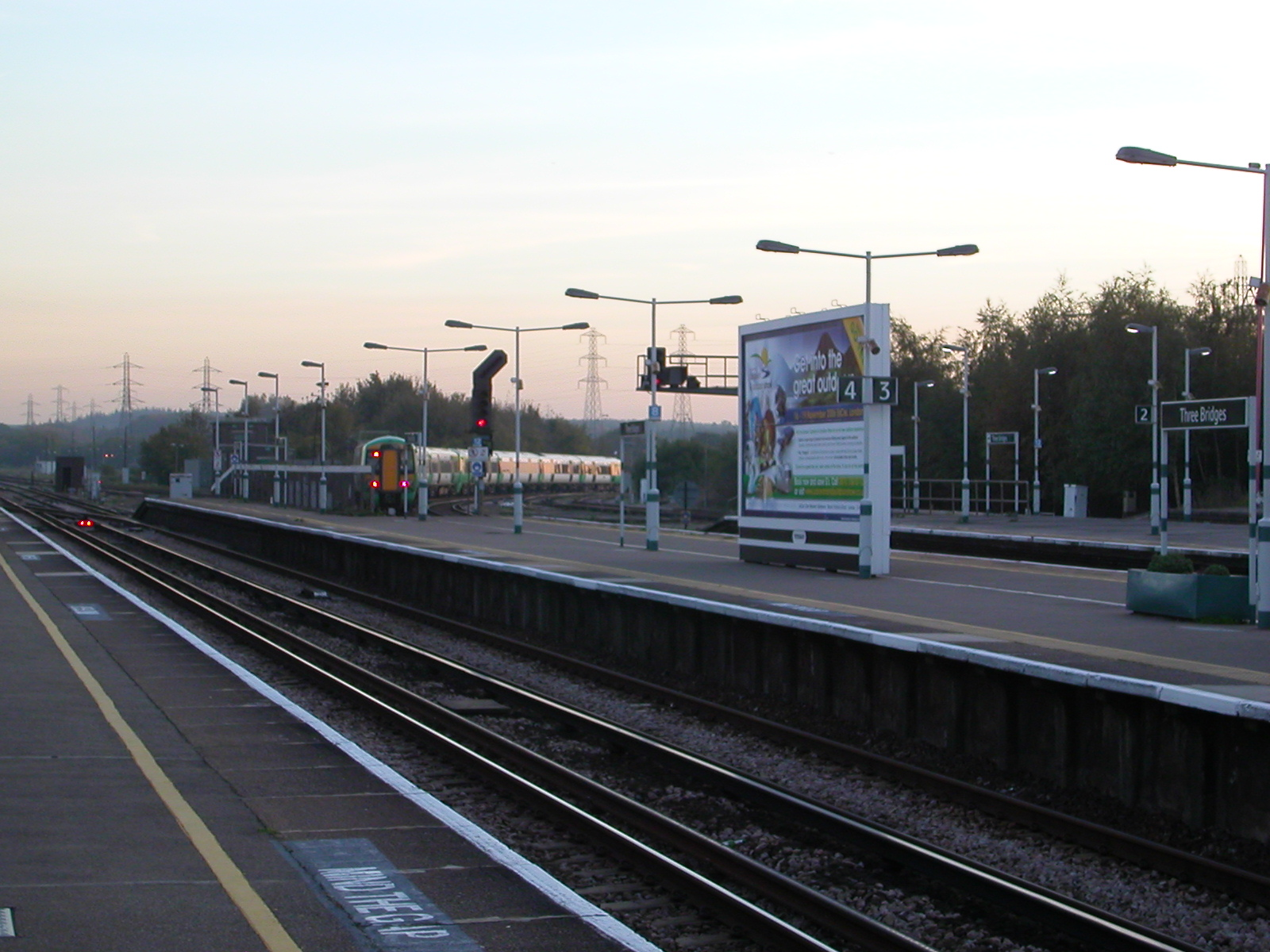
- A southbound Southern Class 377 departing from platform 3, November 2006

General information
- Location: Three Bridges, Borough of Crawley, England
- Grid reference: TQ288369
- Manager: Southern
- Platforms: 5

Other information
- Station code: TBD
- Classification: DfT category C1

History
- Opened: 12 July 1841
- Original company: London & Brighton Railway
- Pre-grouping: London, Brighton & South Coast Railway
- Post-grouping: Southern Railway

Passengers
- 2020/21: ▼0.772 million
- Interchange: ▼0.231 million
- 2021/22: ▲2.195 million
- Interchange: ▲0.560 million
- 2022/23: ▲2.792 million
- Interchange: ▲0.718 million
- 2023/24: ▲3.052 million
- Interchange: ▲0.761 million
- 2024/25: ▲3.307 million
- Interchange: ▲1.076 million
Location
Notes
- Passenger statistics from the Office of Rail and Road

Three Bridges railway station serves the village of Three Bridges, a district of the town of Crawley, in West Sussex, England. This station is where the Arun Valley Line and the Brighton Main Line diverge. Greater Thameslink Railway operates all services, under two brands. Firstly Thameslink operates the majority of services at the station, between Bedford and Brighton, Bedford and Three Bridges, Cambridge and Brighton, and Peterborough and Horsham. The second, the Southern-branded service also operates between here and London Victoria, with trains dividing here to serve either Portsmouth Harbour or Bognor Regis. On Sundays, a half-hourly Southern service operates between Brighton and London Victoria. It lies 29 miles 21 chains (47.1 km) down the line from London Bridge via Redhill. Three Bridges Depot is situated to the south of the station, the main depot for Thameslink Class 700s south of London. A Network Rail signalling centre is also sited nearby.

== History ==
The original Italianate style railway station on the East side of the line at Three Bridges was opened in July 1841 by the London and Brighton Railway at a point next to their proposed branch to Horsham. It was designed by the architect David Mocatta, and was one of a series of standardised modular buildings used by the railway. This building was demolished 5 May 1985. Mocatta's plans for the station indicate that it was originally going to be known as "Crawley" but according to The London and Brighton railway guide, of 1841 and the 1846 timetable it was named "Three Bridges" from the time it was opened.

=== Enlargement ===
The London and Brighton Railway merged with others to become the London Brighton and South Coast Railway in 1846, and the branch to Horsham was opened two years later. Three Bridges was enlarged in July 1855 with the construction of a branch line to East Grinstead and again enlarged in 1906/9 at the time of the quadrupling of the main line. The present ticket office was then built on the west side of the line and new platforms and station buildings for the new lines.

=== Electrification ===
Three Bridges was a key site for the electrification scheme for the Brighton main line during 1932/33, housing the control room for the scheme, and was one of three locations where current was taken from the national network and transmitted to substations. Electric multiple unit trains began to run between London and Three Bridges on 17 July 1932. The line was electrified throughout on 30 December. At the same time the practice of using "slip coaches" for East Grinstead at Three Bridges from expresses bound for the south coast was abandoned by the Southern Railway. The line from Three Bridges to Horsham was electrified in May 1938. The single-track branch line to East Grinstead was never electrified. It remained steam operated, using tank locomotives of the M7 and H classes hauling push–pull trains. After the end of steam operation in 1964, it was then briefly operated by Class 205 diesel-electric multiple units but closed on 2 January 1967.

=== Accidents ===
There have been five recorded accidents at Three Bridges station; the first two of which were relatively minor and involved no injuries. On 12 April 1858, an engine collided with passenger carriages and, on 18 October 1863, an excursion train hit the buffer stops. Two members of station staff died on 13 December 1868 from an explosion of naphtha in a truck of a goods train. On 10 January 1923, shunter Frederick Harmer aged 23, was at work when he slipped from boarding that was covering signal wires. Harmer fell onto the buffer of a wagon and was crushed fatally. On 28 January 1933, an electric train crashed into the back of a steam freight train waiting at the signal box. The driver of the electric train and the guard of the freight train were both seriously injured.

=== Recent history ===
In 2021, a tactile map was installed, in collaboration with the Royal National Institute of Blind People, to help blind and partially sighted passengers navigate the station.

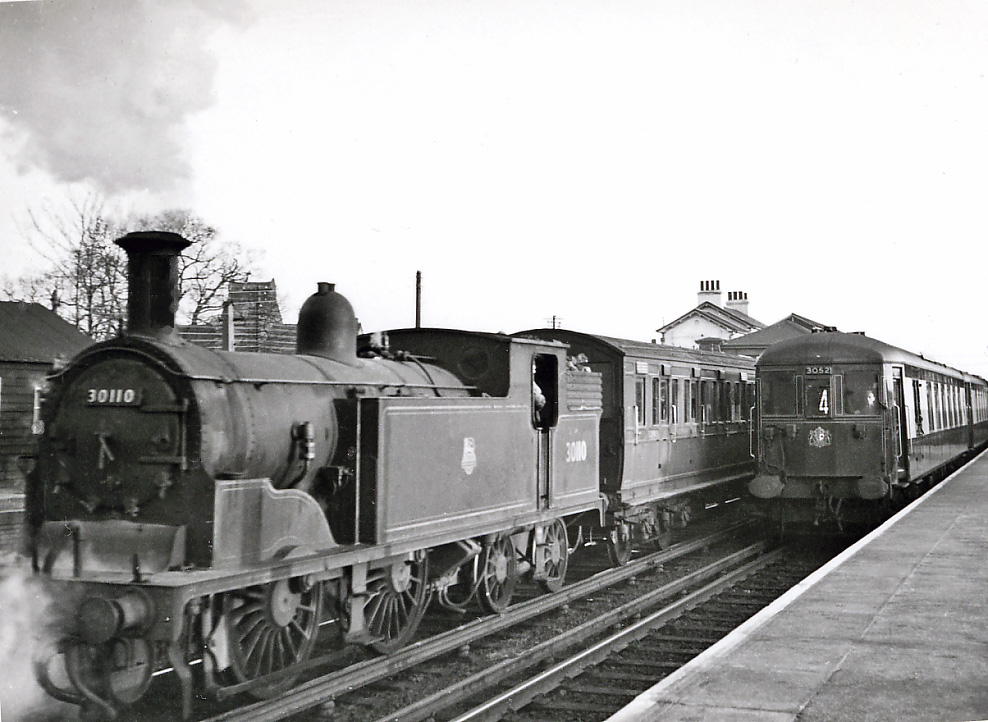
The Brighton Belle (right) passing an auto-train in 1958

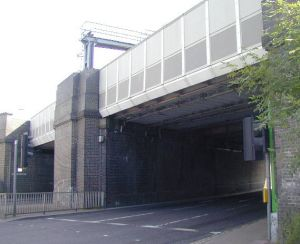
Rail bridge at Three Bridges station

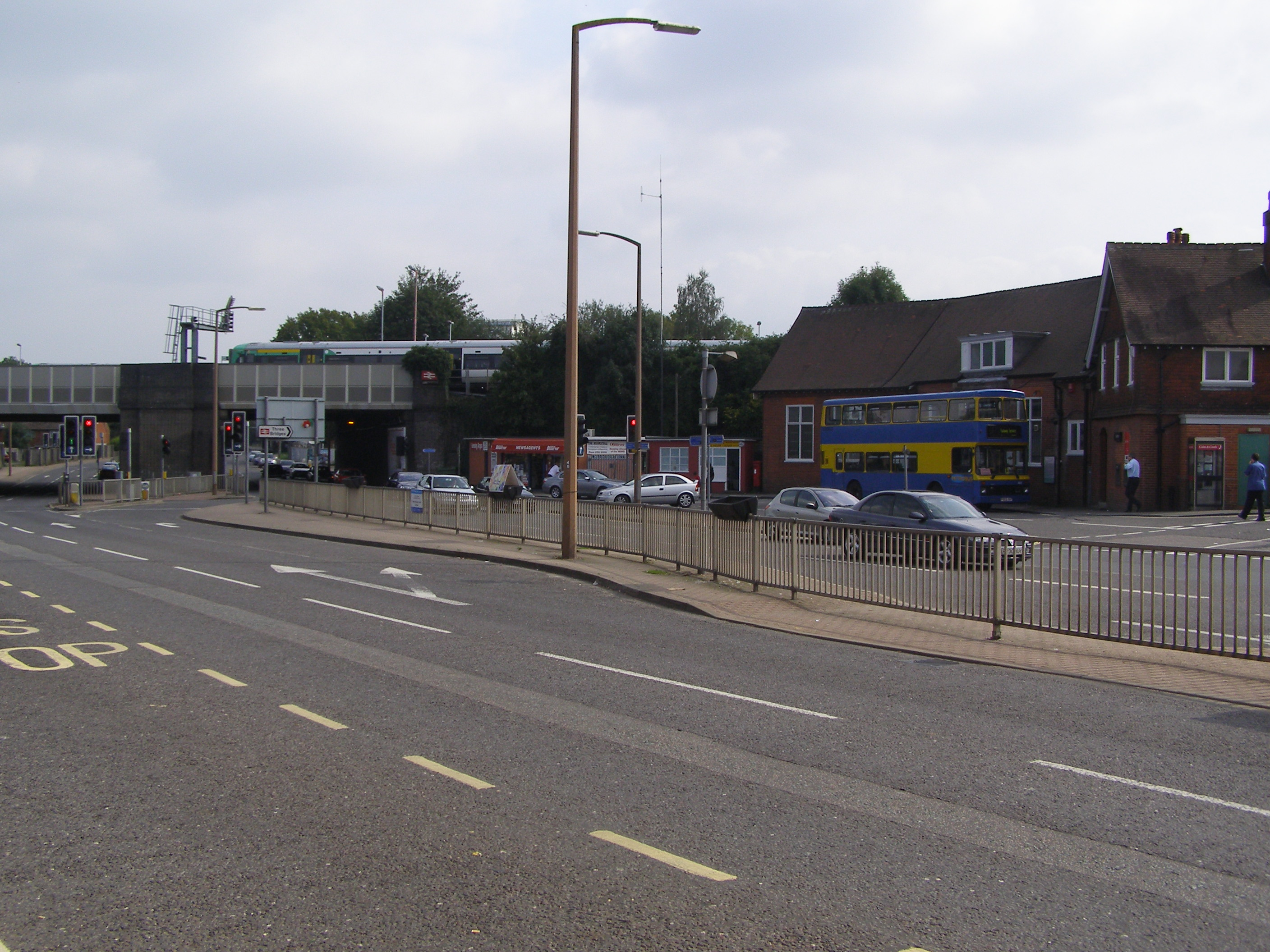
Three Bridges station, viewed from the A2220

== Related rail facilities ==
=== Locomotive depot and goods yard ===
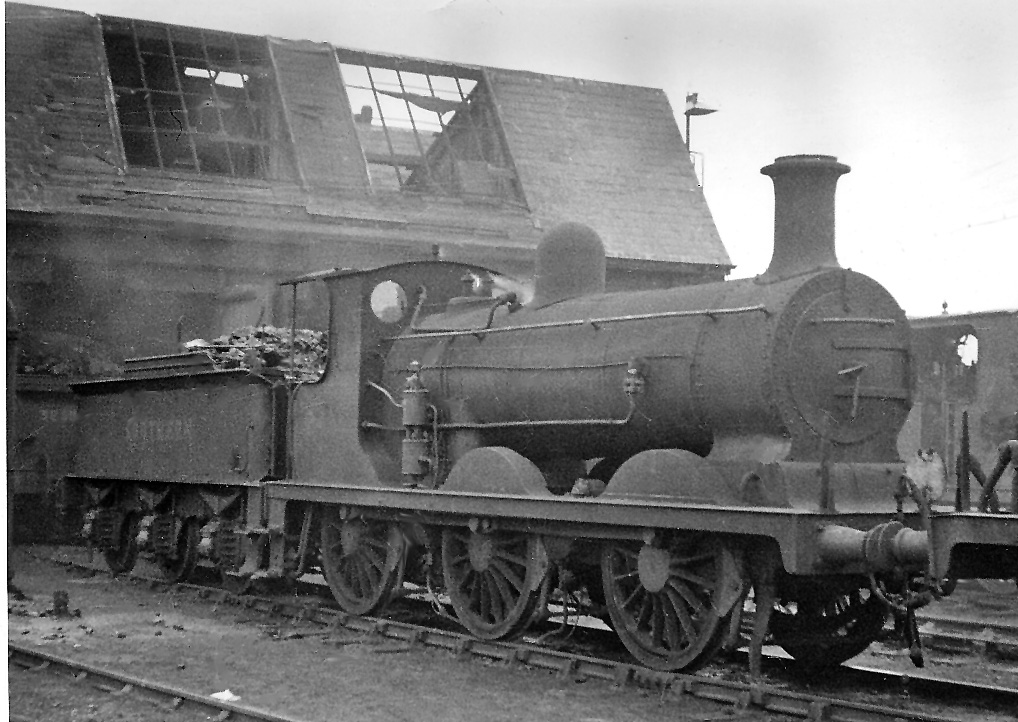
Three Bridges Locomotive Depot, 11 December 1948, before the roof was repaired

An engine shed was opened in July 1848 on a site to the west of the station. This was closed in 1909 to make way for the enlargement of the station and a new depot was established in the fork between the Brighton and Horsham lines in 1911, which remained open until June 1964.

The original small goods yard to the south of the station was greatly extended during the First World War and was used as a marshalling yard for munitions trains heading for the Continent. Trains from the Great Western Railway and the London and North Western Railway were brought here for onward transmission to Newhaven Harbour.

In the early 2000s, Virgin CrossCountry built a depot at Three Bridges operated by English Welsh and Scottish Railway to service its Class 220 Voyagers. It closed following CrossCountry withdrawing its Gatwick and Brighton services in December 2008 and was subsequently demolished and replaced with EMU stabling sidings.

=== Three Bridges rail operating centre ===
In 2010, Network Rail selected Three Bridges as its preferred site for a signalling centre for trains operating in the south-east of England, being central to the London, Brighton and future Thameslink services, with no major negative planning issues. A 1.7 ha (4.2-acre) site 0.5 mi (0.80 km) south of Three Bridges station was selected, located in the "fork" between the Arun Valley Line and Brighton Main Line (51.1123°N 0.1631°W); the centre was located east of a DB Schenker rail depot, and east of depot facilities for the Thameslink rolling stock programme trains, which was under planning development at the same time. The operating centre build was designed as a 71.45 by 34.8 m (234.4 by 114.2 ft) three-storey building with 6,980 m^{2} (75,100 sq ft) of floorspace, providing railway operational, administrative and training facilities. Equipment was primarily on the ground floor, with the operation rooms on first and second floors.

In December 2011, Network Rail began construction of a rail operating centre at Three Bridges, one of 14 countrywide intended to replace several hundred signalboxes; the Three Bridges centre was built to control rail operations in the Sussex area. The facility was constructed by C. Spencer Ltd, and was expected to employ around 600 people, with a 900-person net job benefit once complete. The facility was officially opened in January 2014, with the last section of London Bridge Area Signalling Centre moving to the Three Bridges site in 2020.

=== Three Bridges rolling stock depot ===
In 2009, Network Rail submitted a planning application for a rolling stock depot including a three road shed for trains to be procured under the Thameslink rolling stock programme; rejection of the plans for a sister depot at Hornsey resulted in modified plans being submitted in 2011, with the Three Bridges depot expanded to a five-road shed with additional stabling and facilities. The depot was opened in October 2015.

== Layout ==
The five platforms are utilised as follows:

1. From Crawley to London, via Redhill - some fast services at peak hours
2. To London, via Redhill / down to Chichester (off-peak) (up slow) -some terminating services from Victoria and Bedford (down slow)
3. To Horsham/Bognor/Crawley - occasionally Brighton (down slow)
4. To Bedford - most Thameslink and fast Victoria services (up fast)
5. To Brighton and/or Eastbourne and/or Littlehampton (down fast).

== Facilities ==
Besides a booking hall, the station has a coffee shop and a branch of Greggs, as well as toilets and accessibility lifts to platforms.

== Services ==
Services at Three Bridges are operated by Govia Thameslink Railway, under its two brands, Southern and Thameslink, with Class 377 and 700 electric multiple units.

The typical off-peak service in trains per hour (tph) is:

- 2 tph to London Victoria
- 4 tph to Bedford, via London Bridge; of which:
  - 2 tph run via Redhill
- 2 tph to Cambridge
- 2 tph to Peterborough, via Redhill
- 4 tph to Brighton
- 2 tph to Horsham (stopping)
- 2 tph to Portsmouth Harbour and Bognor Regis, dividing at Horsham.

On Sundays, the services to London Victoria and Cambridge reduce to hourly. The service from Horsham to Peterborough does not run, but instead one of the Bedford trains ordinarily terminating at Three Bridges is extended to Horsham.

During the night, the station is served by a half-hourly Thameslink service to Bedford (not calling at London Bridge). This service runs on Sunday-Friday nights with an hourly Southern service to London Victoria on Saturday nights.

Preceding station	National Rail	Following station
Gatwick Airport	Southern Arun Valley Line	Crawley
Gatwick Airport	Thameslink Arun Valley Line	Crawley
Gatwick Airport	Thameslink Brighton Main Line	Balcombe or Haywards Heath
	Disused railways	
Terminus	British Rail Southern Region Three Bridges to Tunbridge Wells Central Line	Rowfant
