= Three Bridges Depot =

Railway maintenance depot in Three Bridges, West Sussex

- Interactive map of Three Bridges Depot

Location
- Location: Three Bridges, West Sussex, England
- Coordinates: 51.1142°N 0.1606°W
- OS grid: TQ288365

Characteristics
- Owner: Siemens
- Depot code: TB (2015 -)
- Type: Electric Multiple Unit

History
- Opened: 2015

Three Bridges Depot is an Electric Traction Depot located in Three Bridges, West Sussex, England. The depot is about 1.5 km south of Three Bridges railway station, on either side of the Brighton Main Line.

== History ==
Located in the 'fork' between the Brighton Main Line (L&BR 1841), the Arun Valley line (LB&SCR 1848), and the now-closed Three Bridges–Tunbridge Wells line (EGR 1855), the site had historically been used for railway use, having not been built on until railway developments; by 1910 sidings had been built east of the Brighton Main Line, as well as an engine shed and turntable adjacent west of the site; in 2008 the western development area comprised underused sidings and hardstanding with the site east of the mainline including operation sidings, as well as offices; tenants included English Welsh & Scottish Railway, BAM Nuttall, Colas Rail and Balfour Beatty.

=== Thameslink depot ===
As part of the Thameslink Programme, it was decided that a large fleet of new trains, which were later named the Class 700, would be introduced on the Thameslink network.

In 2008, the Department for Transport commissioned a study into the location of depots for the future Thameslink rolling stock: Network Rail preferred two depots based on an expectation that at times the central area of the Thameslink route would be closed for maintenance outside commercial operational hours, with no workable alternative electrified routes available. A single-depot solution was also investigated, but no suitably large sites were identified for such a facility. Sites were considered at: Wellingborough; (Note: Including sidings used by GB Railfreight.) Hornsey; (Note: Adjacent to the existing Hornsey EMU depot then operated by First Capital Connect.) Cricklewood; (Note: On development land associated with the planned Brent Cross Thameslink railway station.) Selhurst; (Note: On the site of the existing Selhurst Depot used by Southern.) Three Bridges; and Tonbridge. By late 2008, the sites had been narrowed to Hornsey, Three Bridges and Tonbridge; finally Hornsey and Three Bridges were selected as a two-depot solution.

In 2009, Arup acting on behalf of Network Rail submitted a planning application for a rolling-stock depot south of Three Bridges railway station on a 13 ha (32-acre) site owned by Network Rail, with facilities on either side of the Brighton Main Line. (Note: The development was a 'permitted development' under Part 11 of the Town and Country Planning (General Permitted Development) Order 1995; the application still required local council approval for certain aspects of the works including the main maintenance building and bridge widening.) The western side of the proposed development included a single-ended 280 by 23 m (919 by 75 ft) three-road maintenance shed 13 m (43 ft) high, a wheel lathe, electricity substation, and sidings for 8 twelve-car trains; the eastern side included stabling for 4 twelve-car trains and an underframe-cleaning facility; both sides of the development were to have separate 325 m^{2} (3,500 sq ft) train-washing facilities, waste storage, and controlled emission toilet facilities. Site offices and warehousing were to be in a 2,857 m^{2} (30,750 sq ft) three-storey building northwest of the main shed.

Planning permission for the development was granted in November 2009, but in December the associated Hornsey depot application was blocked by the Secretary of State for Communities and Local Government John Denham; Network Rail submitted revised plans for both sites in 2011, with a smaller Hornsey scheme and an expanded Three Bridges scheme. At Three Bridges, additional carriage stabling for 5 eight-car trains with CET facilities was added to the north-west of the original site, on the site of an EWS/DB Schenker freight depot and a shed used for stabling of Virgin Crosscountry'sBombardier Voyager trains; the main maintenance building was expanded to a five-road building 40 m (130 ft) wide; stabling was increased to 11 eight-car trains on the original western site and 5 eight-car trains on the eastern site; and additional office and accommodation space was specified.

In the same period as the new application, Network Rail submitted plans for a large railway operation and signalling centre to be built adjacent to the Three Bridges depot (see Three Bridges railway station#Three Bridges rail operating centre).

In mid-2013, VolkerFitzpatrick was awarded the approximately £150 million contract to build the two depots.

The depot was officially opened by Patrick McLoughlin (MP) in October 2015. The completed main facilities building (MFB) was 256 by 40 metres (840 by 131 ft) with five roads, each with full underfloor inspection facilities, and a light (2.5 t) crane. One road had two bogie drops, and a road was fitted with 25 kV AC electrification for static tests though the main building was unelectrified (third rail). Wheel lathes and carriage washes were outside the MFB.

== Allocation ==
As of 2016, the depot's allocation consists of Class 700 EMUs.
