= Three Bridges, West Sussex =

Neighbourhood of Crawley, West Sussex, England

Coordinates: 51.117101°N 0.161000°W

Three Bridges
- Location within West Sussex
- OS grid reference: TQ285375
- District: Crawley
- Shire county: West Sussex
- Region: South East
- Country: England
- Sovereign state: United Kingdom
- Post town: Crawley
- Postcode district: RH10
- Dialling code: 01293
- Police: Sussex
- Fire: West Sussex
- Ambulance: South East Coast
- UK Parliament: Crawley

Three Bridges is one of 14 neighbourhoods within the town of Crawley, in the county of West Sussex in England.

== History ==
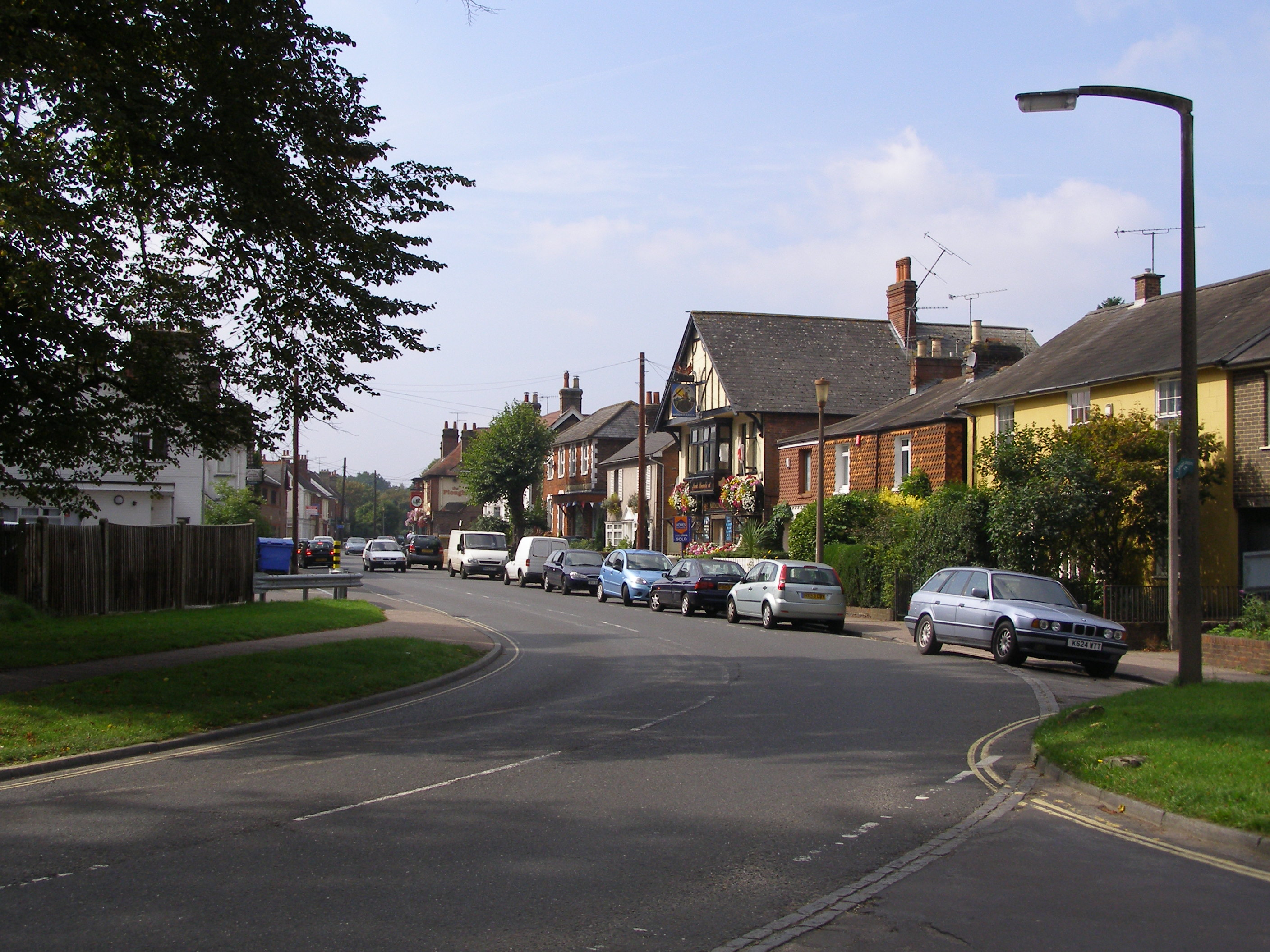
Three Bridges Road, Three Bridges

Three Bridges, at first a tiny hamlet, began to grow with the coming of the London and Brighton Railway in 1841. Despite beliefs to the contrary, the village was named not after rail bridges, but after three much older crossings over streams in the area (River Mole tributaries).

The hamlet became the site of an important railway junction in 1848 with the opening of the branch line to Horsham and thence to Portsmouth. The railway established a motive power depot and marshalling yards to the south of the village. A further branch line to East Grinstead was opened in 1855. The village changed radically with the coming of the New town development in the Crawley area in the late 1940s. Three Bridges was one of the first group of neighbourhoods to be built, by 2020 there were 14 neighbourhoods.

== Railway transport ==
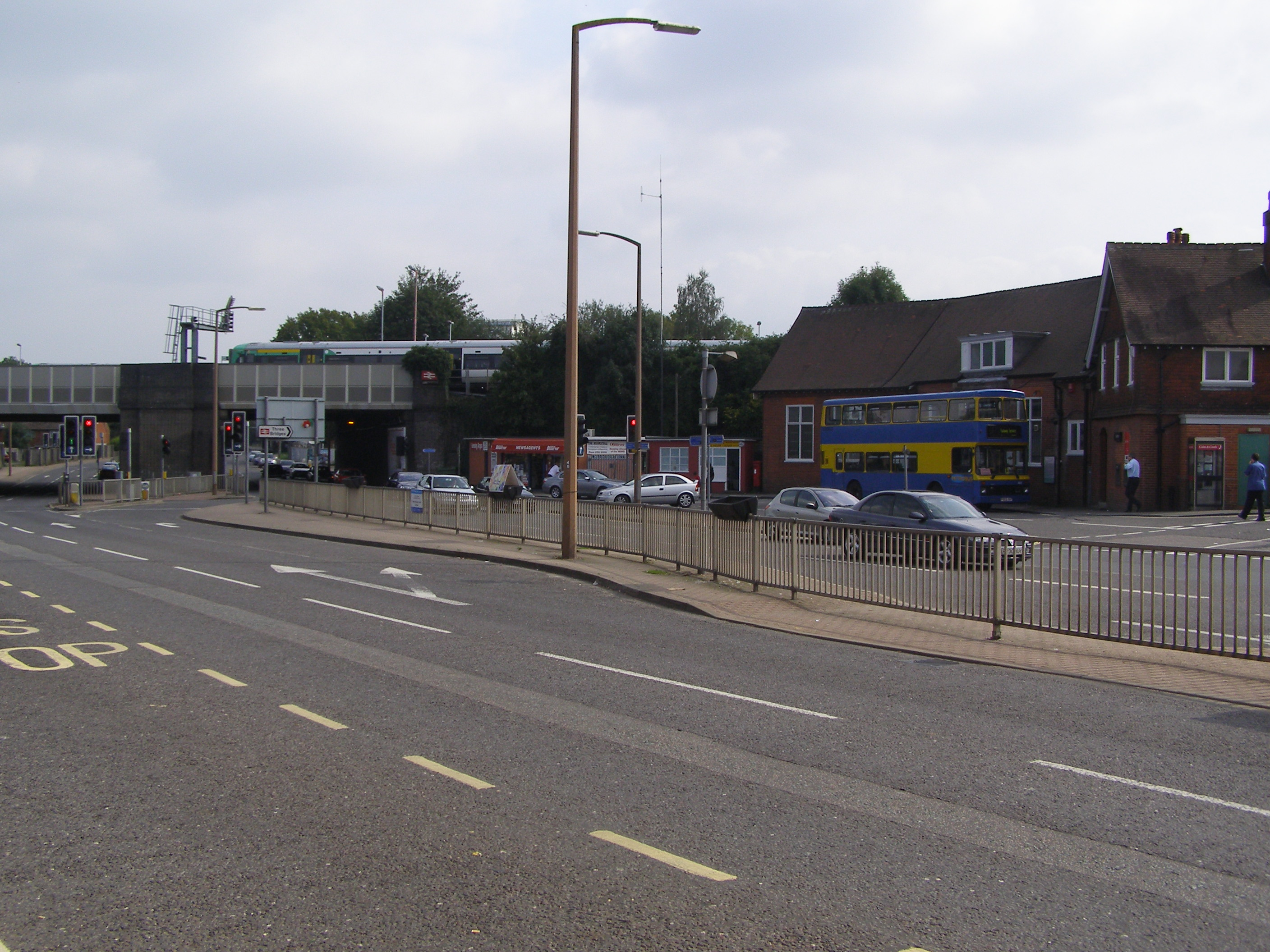
Three Bridges railway station

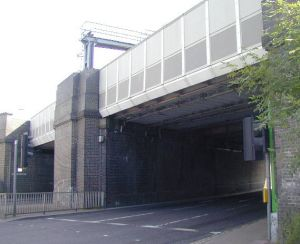
Rail bridge at Three Bridges station

Three Bridges railway station is an important junction station where the Arun Valley Line to Portsmouth branches off from the Brighton Main Line that runs between London and Brighton. A third line to East Grinstead closed on 1 January 1967.

A rolling stock depot, Three Bridges depot, was constructed in the early 2010s for the Thameslink rolling stock programme

Three Bridges ROC, the main operating centre for the south east, is also located close to Three Bridges station.

== Education ==
Hazelwick School is a comprehensive school located in Three Bridges. It was opened as a Secondary Modern School in 1953, which became a Comprehensive school in the mid 1960s. It is also (since 1998) designated as a Technology and Humanities College. Hazelwick has over 110 teachers and more than 2100 pupils. Many former school pupils later became famous including Gareth Southgate and Chico Slimani. It also educated two of the controversial Fertilizer Bomb plotters, Omar Khyam and Jawad Akbar who were arrested, charged and imprisoned for life sentences due to Government Home Security surveillance during Operation Crevice.

Primary schools in Three Bridges include Three Bridges Primary School.

== Sport ==
- Three Bridges F.C. play in the Isthmian League, Premier Division
- Crawley Town F.C. play in Football League Two, the fourth tier of football in England
- Three Bridges Cricket Club play in the Sussex Cricket League
- Crawley Hockey Club plays their home matches at Hazelwick School
