= VolkerRail =

British railway infrastructure services company

VolkerRail Group
- Company type: Private
- Industry: Railway Infrastructure Contractor
- Founded: 1935
- Headquarters: Doncaster, England
- Key people: Steve Cocliff (Managing Director)
- Parent: VolkerWessels
- Subsidiaries: VolkerRail Signalling; VolkerRail; VolkerMatrix; VolkerRail Plant; VolkerRail Welding
- Website: http://www.VolkerRail.co.uk

VolkerRail is a specialist railway infrastructure services company based in Doncaster, England, providing services across the United Kingdom and Ireland. It is wholly owned by Netherlands-based VolkerWessels, a multi-disciplinary construction and civil engineering group.

== History ==
VolkerRail began life as a British Steel subsidiary known as Grant Lyon Eagre Ltd. The company can trace their roots as a contractor in the industry right back to 1935. In 1996 Grant Lyon Eagre Ltd teamed up with Railbouw, based on their existing partnerships, specifically the track renewal works for the London Underground, and became GrantRail.

The company continued to expand and formed various subsidiaries; GrantPlant Ltd, GrantRail Signalling Ltd, GrantRail Power Ltd, ALH Rail Coatings Ltd, and GrantWeld Ltd established in 2002. In September 2006 GrantRail also acquired Matrix Power Ltd, which specialised in electrical and power sectors and could provide support for the Power side of the business.

In late 2008 VolkerWessels bought Corus' half to take full ownership of the company. Following this, the company became VolkerRail on Monday 2 March 2009. Similarly all the divisions were also renamed to reflect the new order.

In February 2010 Gren Edwards stepped down after 18 years at the helm.

== Notable VolkerRail Contracts ==
=== Nuneaton Remodelling and Resignalling ===
In June 2006 GrantRail won the contract to complete the £20 million upgrade of the Network Rail track in the Nuneaton area. This was the final conclusion of a three-stage development that began in 2002. The project was set for 24 months and required the installation of 36 new point ends of switches and crossings, the recovery and plain lining of 37 switch and crossings units, installation of significant lengths of plain line track, signalling mechanical installations, design and erection of 100 new overhead line (OLE) structures, and 19 kilometres (12 mi) of new OLE conductors. This new upgrade would allow Network Rail to increase its line speeds and capacity enhancements between Euston and Glasgow. The project was completed in 2008.

=== Bicester DSDA ===
GrantRail Projects undertook major works at the Ministry of Defence's (MoD) Bicester Modernisation project in Oxfordshire. The project began in late 2007, with the aim of bringing the east sidings up to modern standards. The 1940s 75 lb flatbottom rail placed on light weight concrete sleepers would be taken out and replaced with 1st generation steel sleepers bedded in ash ballast. The project took place in Bicester MoDs' Barracks, which operates a non-explosive military storage and distribution hub. This meant that any member of staff that was working on the project had to be security vetted by the MoD before they would be issued the permits to access the site. Members of staff were also subjected to the strict security requirements of working in an operating barracks, however there was the added benefit of being protected by armed guards! The project was completed in 2008.

=== Nottingham NET project ===
VolkerRail has been involved in five of the six projects in the UK. One of these was the Nottingham Express Transit (NET) project. This is the transit system that supports the largest city in the East Midlands. VolkerRail were responsible for track installation in both on and off street allowing them to use the embedded rail products of their subsidiary company ALH Rail Coatings. They completed 7.5 kilometres (4.7 mi) of on street track and 15.4 kilometres (10 mi) of off street track, of many various types, from ballasted track to direct fix track. Also in the project there were multiple crossovers, crossings, and turnouts. The project was completed in 53 weeks and had a value of £10 million. The project was completed in 2004.

=== Hull Docks ===
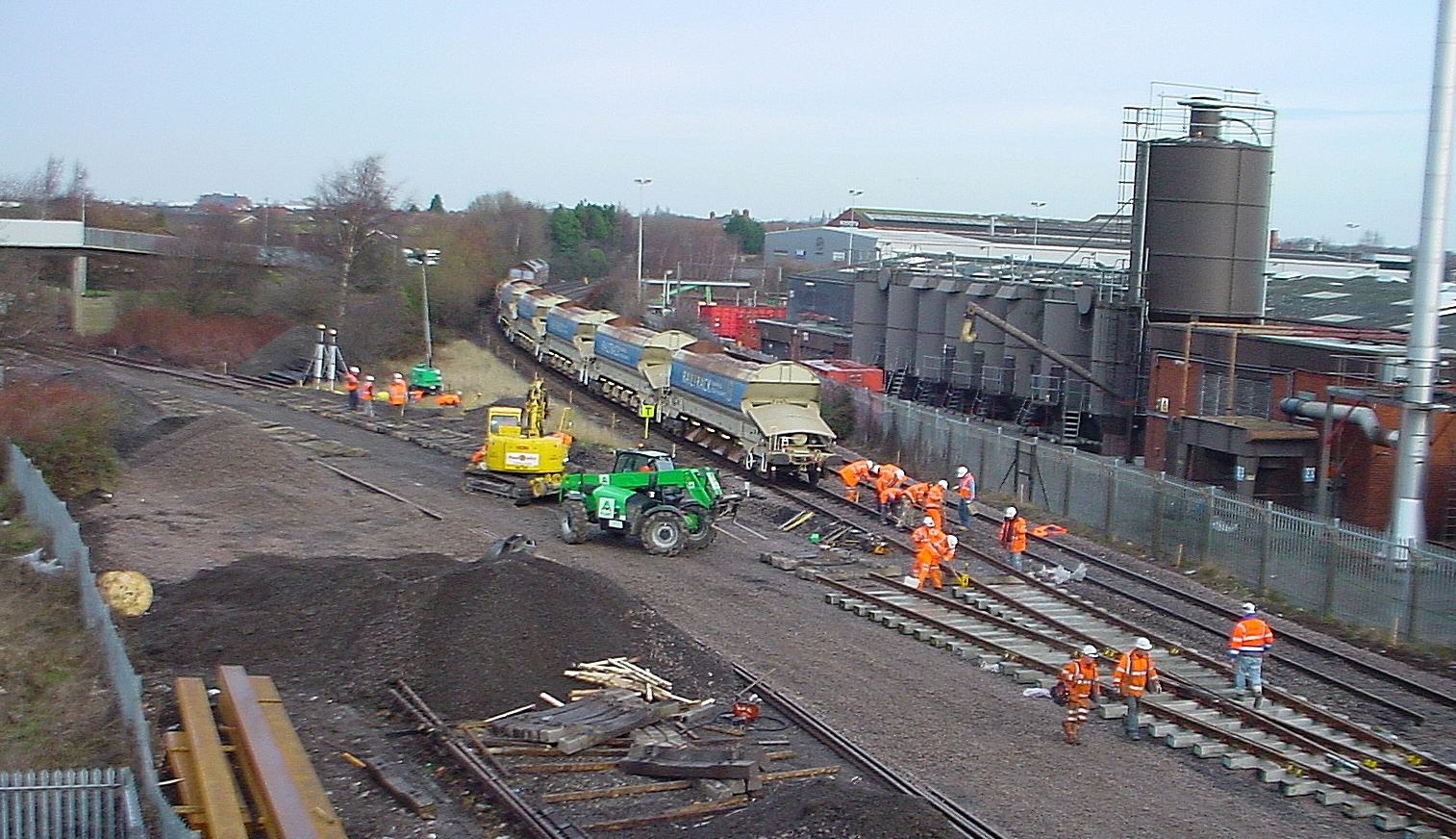
GrantRail reinstating the double junction at Hessle Road, Christmas 2007

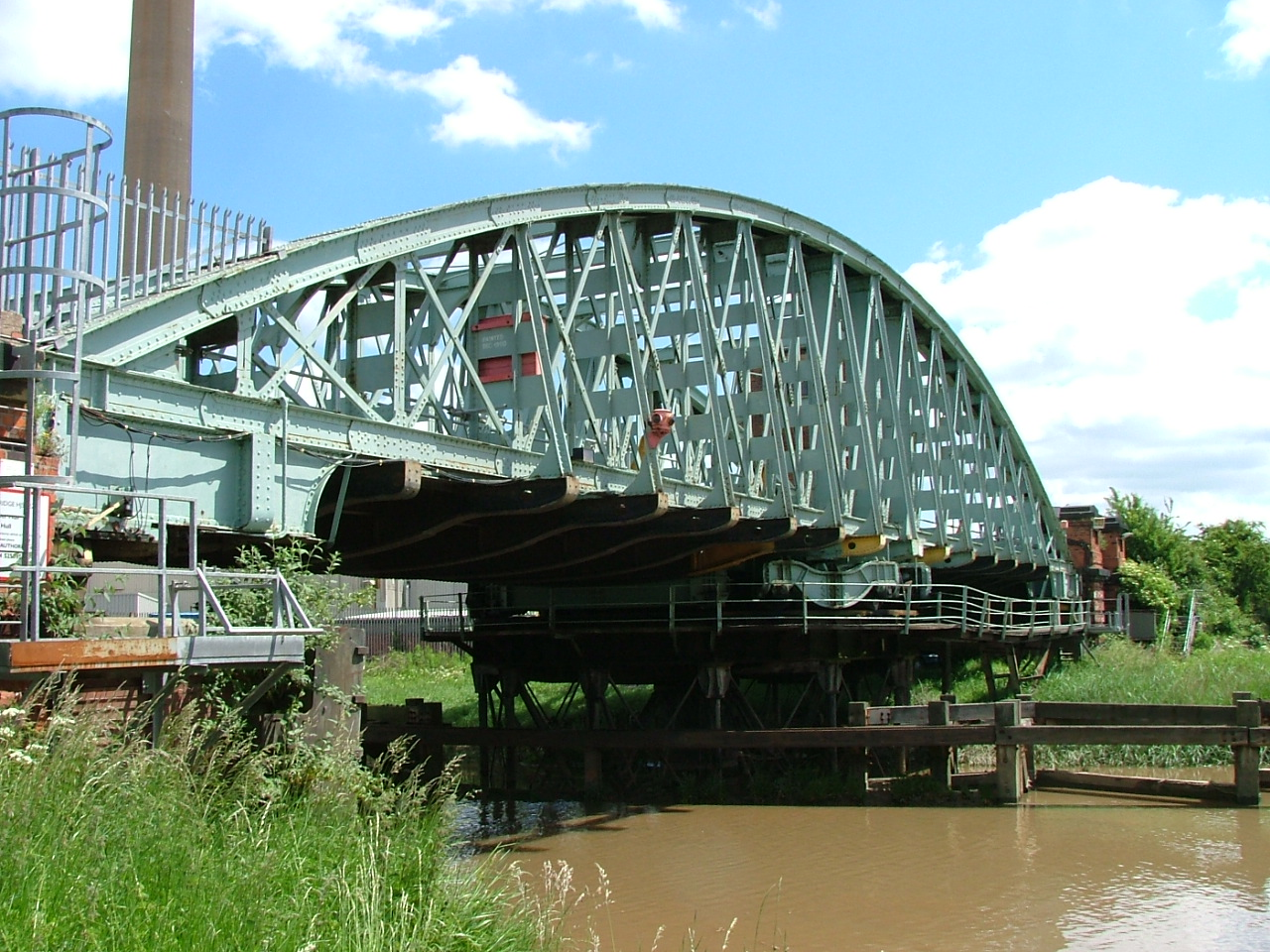
The swingbridge built by the Hull and Barnsley Railway to cross the River Hull.

Hull Docks has been an ongoing project to upgrade the Hull Docks Branch (Engineers' Line Reference HJS) to treble the lines capacity as the amount of rail traffic through ABP's Hull Docks site increases. The branch is part of the old Hull and Barnsley Railway and was originally built, primarily, for the export of coal via the docks in Hull. Much of the increased rail traffic is, ironically, imported coal. Work also saw many structures along the line upgraded to cater for heavier trains. Included in this part of the project is Hull Bridge, the former Hull and Barnsley swingbridge, known officially as HJS-22. The structure dates from 1885 when the line originally opened. Other work has included multiple earth works and a greatly improved and upgraded signalling system to cope with the increased traffic.

The upgraded line was formally opened in June 2008 by the transport minister Rosie Winterton. Work continued on the line after the official opening; the upgraded signalling system began use in September 2008.

=== Maintenance at Tata Scunthorpe ===
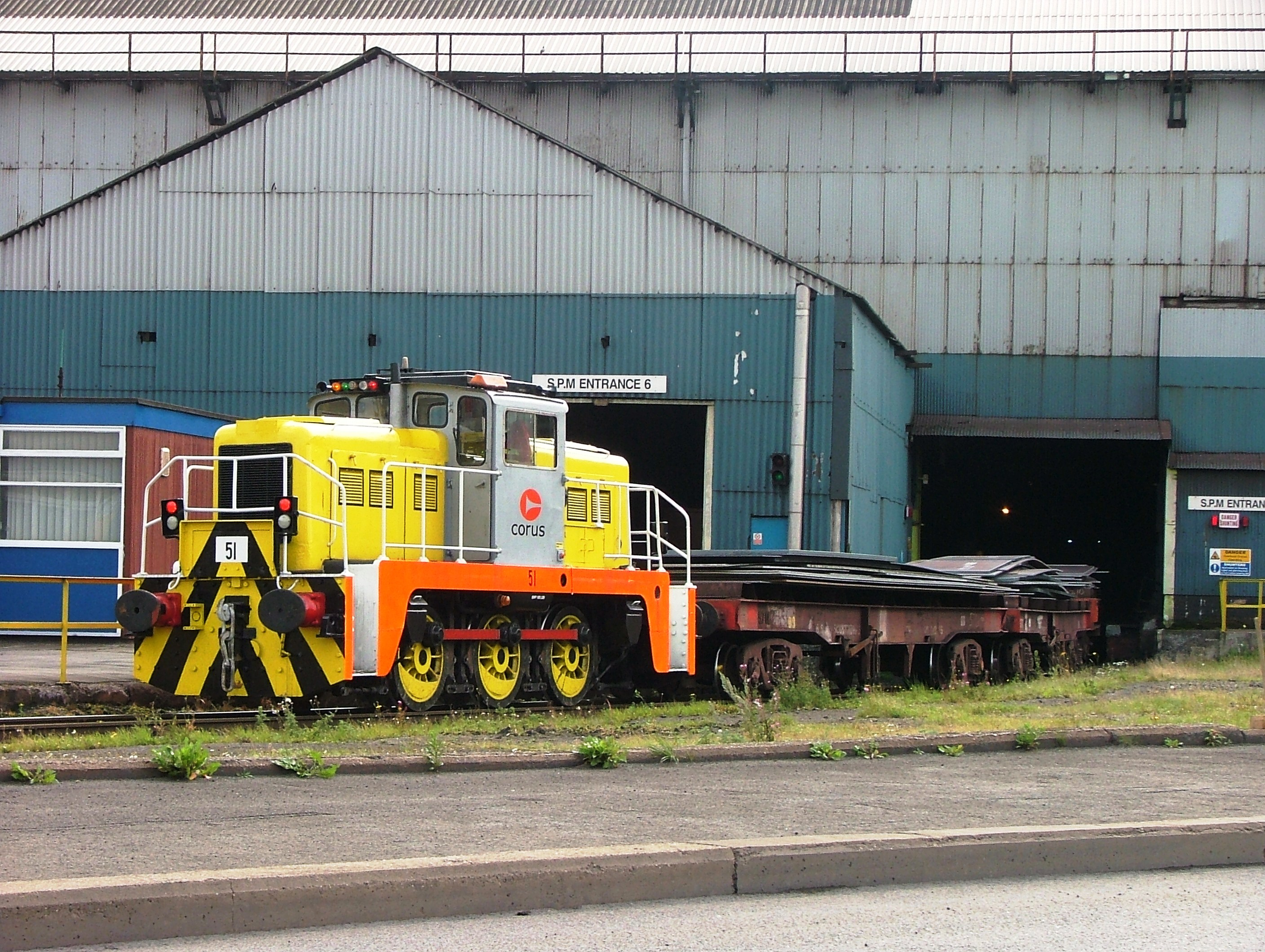
Locomotive 51 at Scunthorpe steelworks

VolkerRail also undertake the Permanent Way maintenance at Tata's Scunthorpe works. This is a very long standing contract and is a legacy of British Steel's ownership of Grant Lyon Eagre and subsequently Corus' part ownership of GrantRail. Work undertaken encompasses all aspects of permanent way work. As well as usual maintenance tasks VolkerRail also undertake renewals and some small scale new build work – larger scale projects are put out to tender although the largest rail project, The Rail Service Centre for handling Continuous Welded Rail trains, was also undertaken VolkerRail (though as GrantRail at the time). As rail is now produced on site Tata supply this for renewals work and it allows rails of 120', rather than the usual 60' lengths, to be used and reduce the number of rail joints. Due to the changing nature of a steel works and the traffic requirements there is a small amount of recovery work for sections which are no longer in use.

=== Maintenance in Sheffield ===
VolkerRail have been selected to take part in the maintenance of the Sheffield Supertram network. The work, which is the largest investment programme in the tram system since it began running, involves replacing 5,450 metres (17,880 ft) of the tram track, which was originally laid around 20 years ago and is now experiencing wear. During the project, harder wearing steel will be installed to ensure a longer lifespan, estimated at 25–30 years. Supertram has operated the system since 1997 and has turned it into a successful tram network which is now used by around 15 million people every year.

== Joint ventures ==
VolkerRail's joint ventures include work on the west coast mainline, major involvement in WARM (West Anglia Route Modernization), and the switches and crossing for NET (Nottingham Express Transit). At present VolkerRail are still extending their partnerships and are currently involved in many joint ventures.

=== London Underground (GTJV) ===
GTJV was a joint venture between VolkerRail and Trackwork. The joint venture (JV) was awarded a £150 million contract from Tube Lines in 2003 to provide track renewal for 155 kilometres (96 mi) of line. This was the largest contract awarded by Tube Lines and a further £55 million was provided for plant, materials, and Tube Lines' management support. Tube Lines were committed to investing a billion pounds into London Underground and this was the first contract. GTJV beat its main rival Jarvis in order to win this contract. Jarvis themselves were a shareholder in Tube Lines Company. A spokeswoman from Tube Lines said there was no pressure to award the contract to one of its own shareholders. "The bid process is independent and transparent. GrantRail-Trackwork was chosen because it was the best tender." GTJV will be responsible for replacing or refurbishing 35 kilometres (22 mi) of track on the Jubilee line and 60 kilometres (37 mi) of track on the Northern and Piccadilly Lines. The replacement of around 50% of the track will make the lines more reliable, faster, and smoother. The project lasted for seven and a half years and ended in 2010.

=== Docklands Light Rail (DLR) (SGRJV) ===
VolkerRail is also involved in a joint venture with Skanska known as the Skanska GrantRail Joint Venture (SGRJV). The JV has been awarded the two main construction contracts; Package 8, January 2007, and Package 6, June 2007, of the DLR extension to Stratford International. These two packages are part of the expansion of the DLR for the 2012 Olympic Games. SGRJV was chosen over Hochtief, Carillion and Amec to win the package 8 contract. The £39 million project involves the construction of two platforms on the north bound of Stratford station, the shell and foundations of the new DLR station at Stratford International, and track alignment work for the new rail link. The expansion package should be completed by 2009. Package 6, worth £67 million, will provide the Stratford International extension, which will run to Canning Town and be connected to the Beckton and future Woolwich Arsenal DLR routes. The work will include the conversion of the line between Canning Town and Stratford to Docklands Light Rail Operation, upgrading existing stations to DLR standards, construction of four new stations, and interface with new signalling installation construction. The project was completed in 2010.

=== M-Pact Thales Consortium ===
In June 2008 the M-Pact Thales consortium was awarded Greater Manchester's Metrolink phase 3a extension project contract, worth over £350 million. This consortium is composed of VolkerRail, Laing O’Rourke, and Thales. This major expansion scheme will input almost 32 kilometres (20 mi) of new Metrolink tram lines with new routes and stops. The consortium is currently carrying out preparatory surveys, exploratory works, and detailed civil engineering for the project. This extension takes five million car journeys off the local roads each year, with the number of tram passengers increasing to more than 90,000 a year. The project was completed in spring 2011.

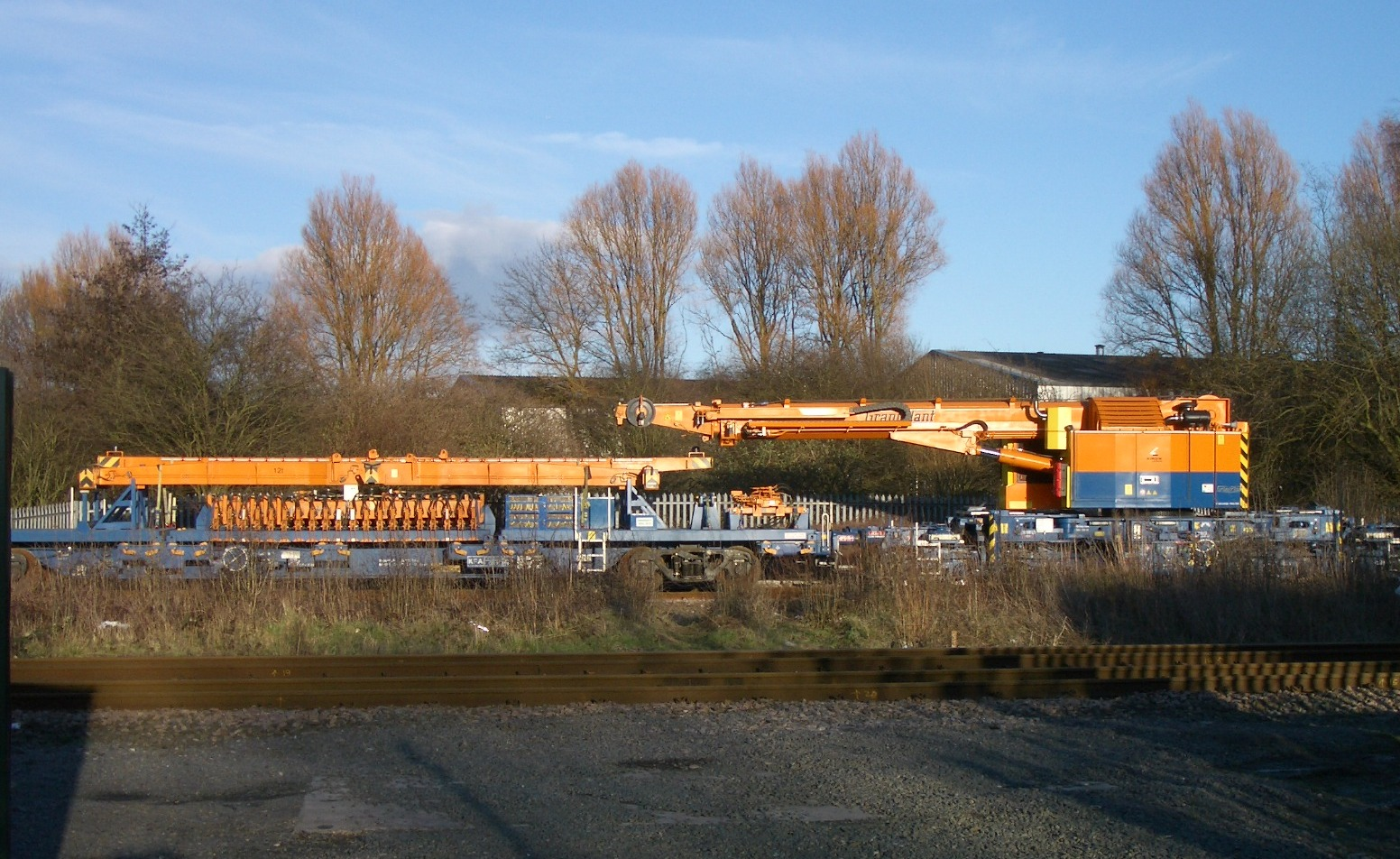
GrantRail Kirow 250 waiting to work sat at Cossall 2007

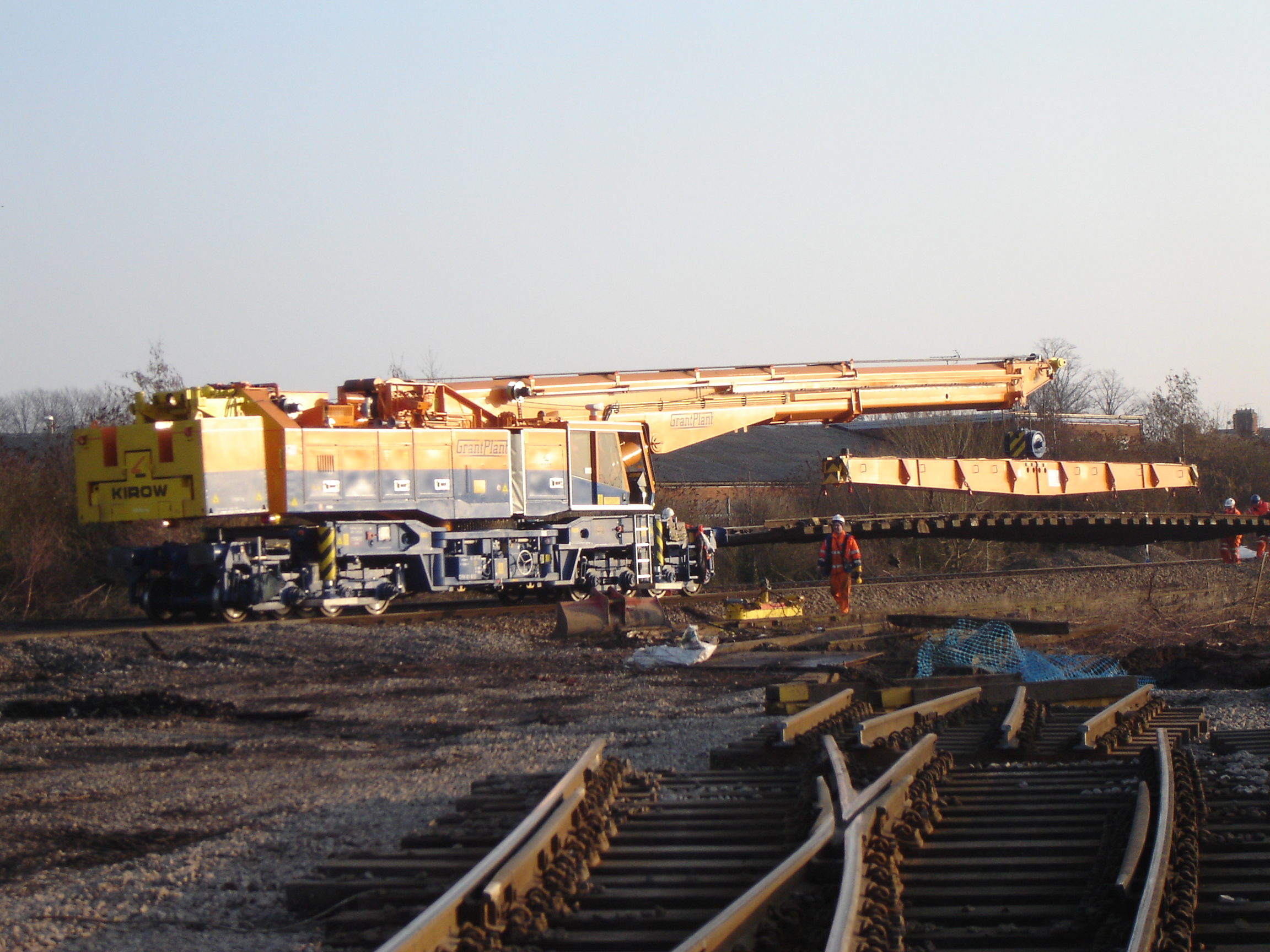
GrantRail Kirow 1200 removing scrap panels at Knighton Junction 2006
