= Leagrave railway station =

Railway station in Bedfordshire, England

Coordinates: 51.905205°N 0.458625°W

Leagrave
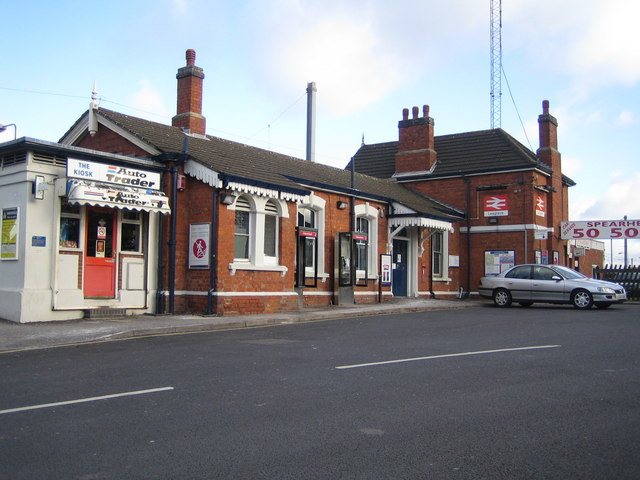
- Main station building

General information
- Location: Leagrave, Borough of Luton; England
- Grid reference: TL061241
- Managed by: Thameslink
- Platforms: 4

Other information
- Station code: LEA
- Classification: DfT category D

History
- Opened: 13 July 1868

Passengers
- 2020/21: ▼0.538 million
- 2021/22: ▲1.116 million
- 2022/23: ▲1.380 million
- 2023/24: ▲1.484 million
- 2024/25: ▲1.496 million
Location
Notes
- Passenger statistics from the Office of Rail and Road

Leagrave railway station is located in Leagrave, a suburb in the north of Luton, in Bedfordshire, England. It is situated on the Midland Main Line, 33¾ miles (54 km) north of London St Pancras International. The station is managed by Govia Thameslink Railway, which also operates all services on the Thameslink route.

== History ==
The station was built by the Midland Railway in 1868 on the eastern side of Leagrave Village as part of the extension to St. Pancras line. Passenger services began on 13 July 1868.

The old Midland station buildings still exist, having been carefully restored in the 1980s. The station buildings underwent some further alteration in 2011 when ticket barriers were installed along with some external alteration to the façades where former windows were made into door ways. The buildings are locally listed as being of significant architectural merit.

== Facilities ==
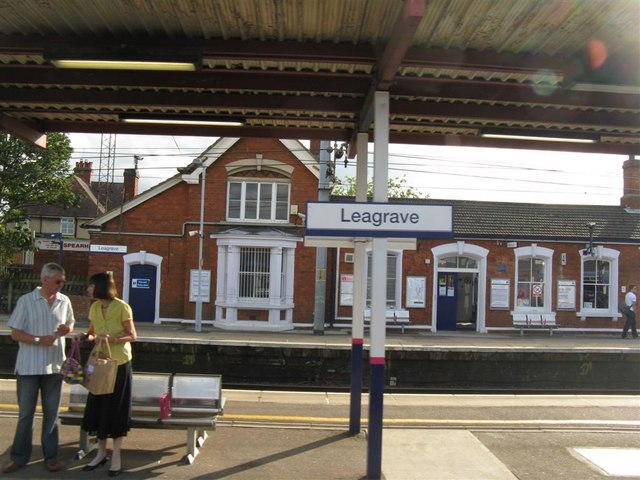
Leagrave Station

Leagrave station is a commuter station serving Luton North and surrounding villages, it has seen an increase in passenger number of circa 25% over the period 2010 to 2015 to 1.9million passengers per annum. There is a newsagent and toilet facilities on platform 4, an independent coffee shop on platform 1 a taxi rank outside platform 4 and a minicab office outside the station adjacent to the main building. Car parking can be found on both sides of the station. The station is staffed during the day and evening, although Thameslink has proposed closing the ticket office.

There is a free Council car park besides Leagrave Common ground just 10 minutes walking distance from Leagrave station towards Sundon Park.

The station has a PlusBus scheme where train and bus tickets can be bought together for a cheaper price. It is in the same area as Luton and Luton Parkway stations.

== Services ==
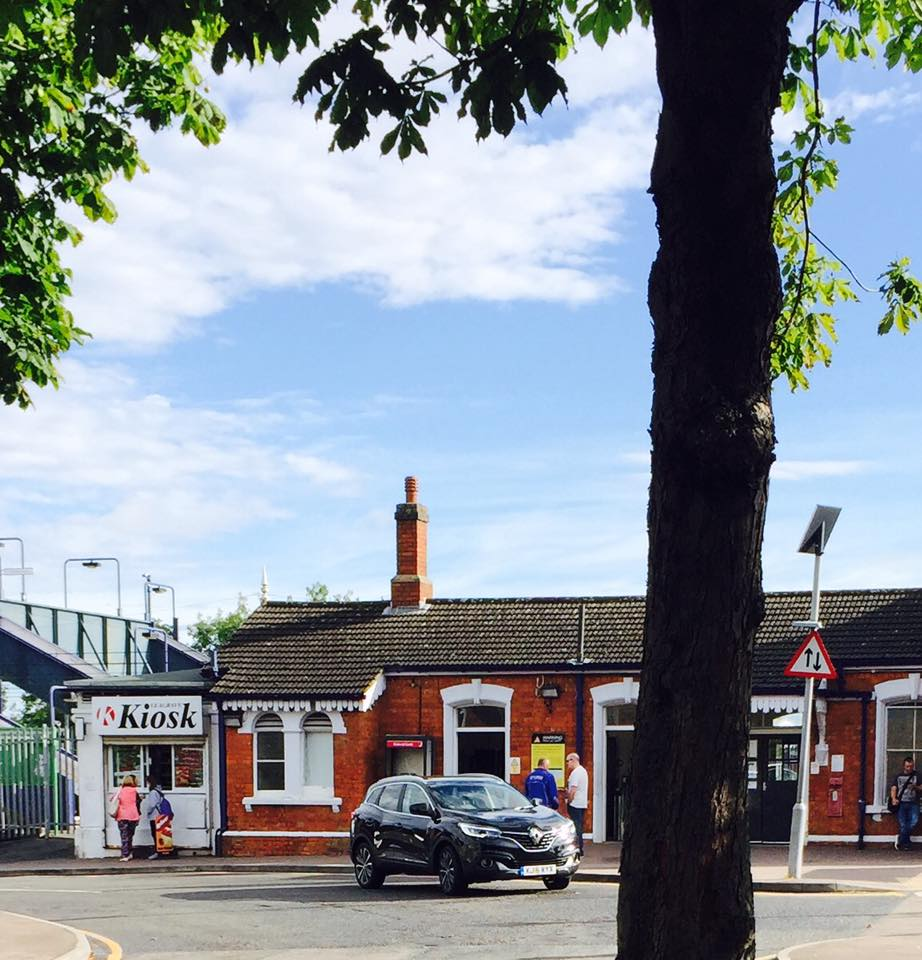
Leagrave station, taken from Compton Avenue

All trains at Leagrave are operated by Govia Thameslink Railway, using Class 700 electric multiple units.

As of June 2024, the typical off-peak service in trains per hour (tph) is as follows:

- 4 tph to Bedford, calling at Harlington and Flitwick.
- 2 tph to Brighton, calling at Harpenden, St Albans City, West Hampstead Thameslink, London St Pancras International, Farringdon, City Thameslink, London Blackfriars, London Bridge, East Croydon, Gatwick Airport, Three Bridges, Balcombe, Haywards Heath, Wivelsfield, Burgess Hill, Hassocks and Preston Park.
- 2 tph to Three Bridges, calling at Harpenden, St Albans City, London St Pancras International, Farringdon, City Thameslink, London Blackfriars, London Bridge, Norwood Junction, East Croydon, South Croydon, Purley, Earlswood, Salfords, Horley and Gatwick Airport.

During peak times, there are additional trains to East Grinstead, Sutton and Rainham. On Sundays, trains run to Horsham.

Preceding station	National Rail	Following station
Harlington	Thameslink	Luton
