= Earlswood =

Suburb of Redhill, Surrey, England

Coordinates: 51.228°N 0.171°W

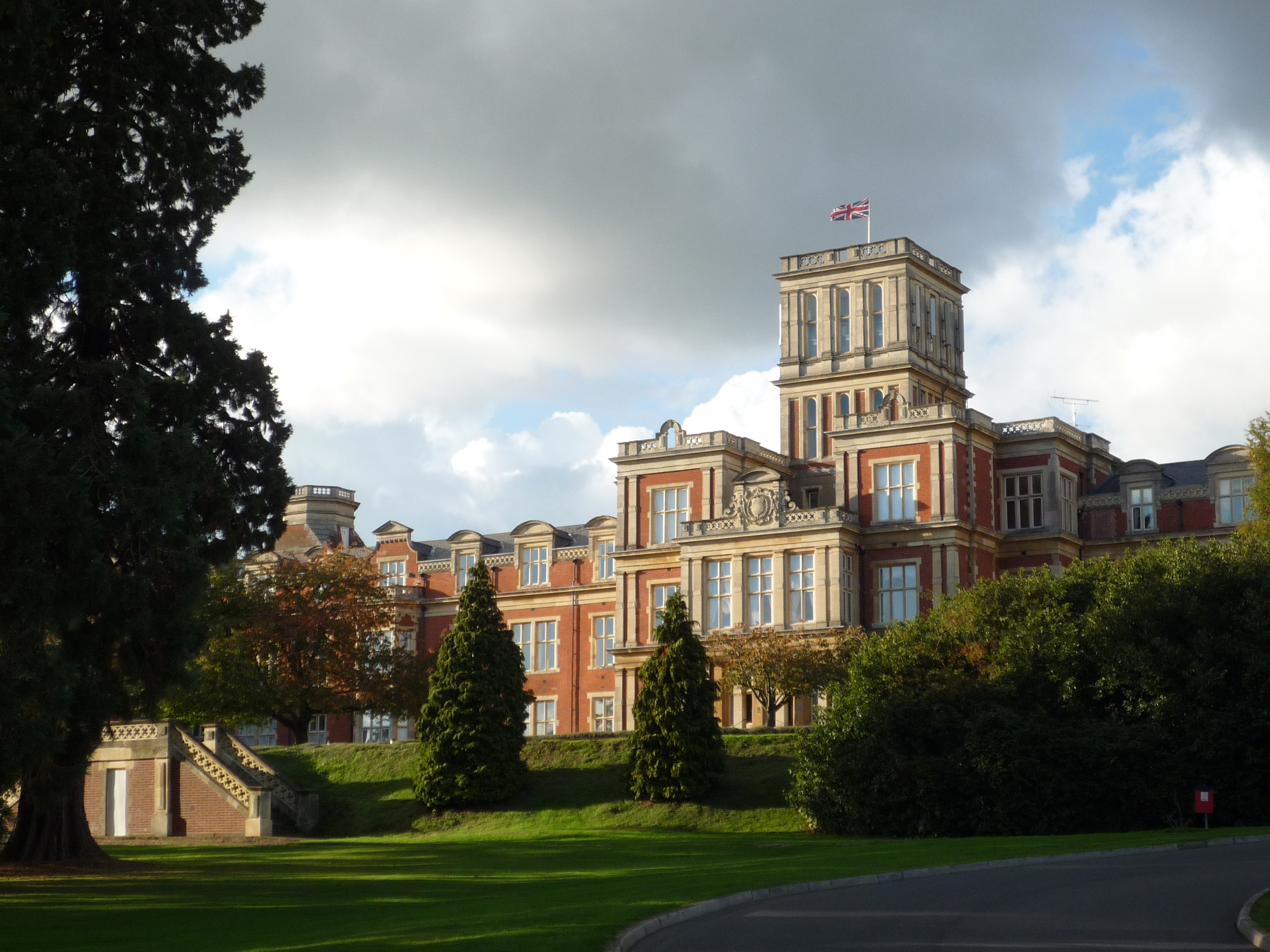
- Victoria Court, Royal Earlswood Park

- Location within Surrey
- Population: 5,049
- OS grid reference: TQ280495
- District: Reigate and Banstead
- Shire county: Surrey
- Region: South East
- Country: England
- Sovereign state: United Kingdom
- Post town: Redhill
- Postcode district: RH1
- Dialling code: 01737
- Police: Surrey
- Fire: Surrey
- Ambulance: South East Coast
- UK Parliament: Reigate

Earlswood is a suburb of Redhill in Surrey, England, which lies on the A23 between Redhill (in the direction of London) and Horley (next to Gatwick Airport). Earlswood Common is a local nature reserve that separates the suburb from the southern outskirts of Reigate and has two lakes and picnic areas. Earlswood station is on the Brighton Main Line. To the east of the line are Royal Earlswood Park, the East Surrey Hospital and Whitebushes.

== History ==
When the straight turnpike, part of the London to Brighton railway, was cut between Earlswood Common and the railway line, there was a claim that traces of a Roman villa were discovered, but no evidence has so far been found to indicate any Roman presence. The area south of the common, locally known as Whitebushes, was formerly a wilderness containing many clay pits that may be linked to the reputed Roman remains. Most trees of the Weald that covered Earlswood Common were cut down in the 17th century by order of local noble, Lord Monson and the land was inclosed in 1886. Brickworks were a considerable employer in the Victorian period and in 1911.

In 1863 Earlswood joined Meadvale, Redhill and Reigate to become part of the newly formed municipal borough of Reigate when it was granted this status by royal charter.

Earlswood was home to the Royal Earlswood psychiatric hospital, founded as a 'national home' and opened by Albert, Prince Consort, which functioned until 1997. Also here was the Royal Philanthropic Society's reform school, from 1849 until 1988. The site has been redeveloped into a housing area called Royal Earlswood Park, providing apartments and houses.

The suburb is served by Earlswood railway station, with trains running from Bedford to Three Bridges via London Bridge. The station previously had a third platform which gave access to the Royal Earlswood Hospital.

Earlswood Common was converted the late 1800s from open pasture to a pleasure ground, which remained in use until World War II. The lower lake has a concrete bottom and was used during the First World War to test the ability of primitive tanks to cross flooded landscapes, having previously been used for summer swimming.

== Demography ==
At the 2001 census area, the ward named Earlswood and Whitebushes had a population of 8,234; Earlswood is identifiable as Reigate and Banstead 14A, 14D and 14E (Lower Layer Super Output Areas) with a population of 5,049.

== Geography ==
Earlswood Common is a Local Nature Reserve. It contains two artificial landscaped lakes, which are used for recreational purposes. The upper lake has ducks and wildfowl. Until 2019, much of Earlswood Common had formed Earlswood Common golf course. The golf course was forced to close in March 2019, after 130 years, due to the closure of the Redhill & Reigate Golf Club which had previously maintained the Earlswood course.

== Localities ==
=== Earlswood ===
An area of predominantly Victorian housing, much of it terraced and semi-detached, immediately south of Redhill town centre bordered to the north by Hooley lane, to the west by the A23 Brighton Road, to the south by the Royal Earlswood Park housing development and to the east by fields. Redhill Brook runs north-south through the middle of Earlswood but is not visible in most of it. Two train lines run through Earlswood. The Redhill and Quarry Lines, both part of the Brighton Line, merge just north of Earlswood and run through Earlswood Station although there is no Quarry Line Platform. The Redhill to Tonbridge line passes through north Earlswood in between Redhill and Nutfield stations.

There are a nursery, primary and junior school in north Earlswood operated by the Earlswood Schools Federation. The schools have, along with the plentiful green space and good transport links, attracted young families to the area.

There are a few places of religious worship in Earlswood. There is St John's church on St Johns Road, opposite Earlswood, and there is also a Mosque on Earlswood Road, the Redhill Jamia Mosque Al-Mustafa. This is one of 3 mosques in the Redhill area, along with Masjid Al Yaqeen on Warwick Road, Redhill, and Masjid ul Emaan on Frenches Road near Watercolour and Merstham.

=== South Earlswood ===
One sub-area of Earlswood, South Earlswood is a separate neighbourhood containing approximately half of the housing, which constitutes the main land use in Earlswood. Separating it from the north are Earlswood Common and the Greensand Way, which follows the Greensand Ridge from Haslemere to Kent. Immediately adjoining South Earlswood is the village or neighbourhood of Whitebushes, which is contiguous therefore, apart from councillors, is difficult to separate artificially.

=== Whitebushes ===
A mixed housing estate built in the 1970s and early 1980s, mainly consisting of 4 and 3 bedroom homes and some flats, surrounded by pre-existing farmland, South Earlswood and the railway line. East Surrey Hospital opened in 1979 to its north. A small portion of farmland remains common land where (traditionally) gypsy horses, used for riding lessons and transport, have grazed since the 1950s.

The area has been occupied since medieval times and probably before that, as evidenced by archaeological finds nearby of an axe and flint flakes. The surrounding farms date back to the 13th and 14th centuries, notably Hazelhurst Farm from 1203 and Dean Farm from 1316. There is evidence of a medieval farmstead in Woodlands Field, off Green Lane. This consists mainly of soil marks in a square of about 350m and an adjoining L-shaped mark. The pottery has been dated to 1250–1350.

In the 19th century a number of brick works sprung up in the area. The Reigate Isolation Hospital was established in 1884 and later renamed to the Reigate Rural District Infectious Diseases Hospital. In 1900 a second establishment, the Reigate Borough Isolation Hospital, was opened. Around 1927 the two establishments were combined into a single Isolation Hospital run by the Reigate Joint Hospital Board as part of the Redhill County Hospital. In 1960 the site was acquired by University College Hospital and renamed Jordan's Hospital for the treatment of Tropical Diseases, especially leprosy. The site was sold for development, demolished and in 1970 and the estate between Green Lane and the railway, including Jordans Close, was built. East Surrey hospital was built as a replacement for Jordan’s hospital in 1979

The Brighton Main Line passes the west of Whitebushes and was opened in 1841. An ancient trackway along what is now Green Lane, The Brow and the western leg of Bushfield Drive, links Whitebushes to Earlswood station to the north and Salfords station to the south. Somewhat circuitous routes under the railway link to the parking areas by these stations for those unwilling to walk.

== Local governance ==
Surrey County Council Following boundary changes in response to the new communities built at The Watercolour and Park 25 developments East of Redhill, Earlswood is now split between two divisions at Surrey County Council level. Earlswood North falls with the Redhill East division and Earlswood South falls within the Earlswood and Reigate South division. This does cause some confusion as there is also a Redhill East ward at borough council level which Earlswood is not part of. Both are elected every four years. They are currently represented by:

Redhill East: Mr Jonathan Essex of the Green Party who, in being elected, became the first member of his party to sit on Surrey County Council.

Earlswood and Reigate South: Catherine Margaret Baart (Green Party (England and Wales)), was voted in by the electorate in 2021.

Reigate and Banstead At Borough council Earlswood North and South are combined to form one division, simply Earlswood. Three Earlswood councillors sit on Reigate and Banstead borough council, who are:

Election	Member	Ward
2019	Ruth Ritter	Earlswood and Whitebushes
2021	Joseph Booton	Earlswood and Whitebushes
2021	Della Torra	Earlswood and Whitebushes

== Amenities ==
Earlswood Common, an 89-hectare (220-acre) local nature reserve, is managed by Reigate and Banstead Borough Council.

Football club Redhill F.C. has its ground, Kiln Brow, on a site in Earlswood on the east side of the A23, immediately north of East Surrey Hospital.

== See also ==
- List of places of worship in Reigate and Banstead
