= Luton Airport Parkway station =

Railway station in Bedfordshire, England

Coordinates: 51.873°N 0.396°W

Luton Airport Parkway
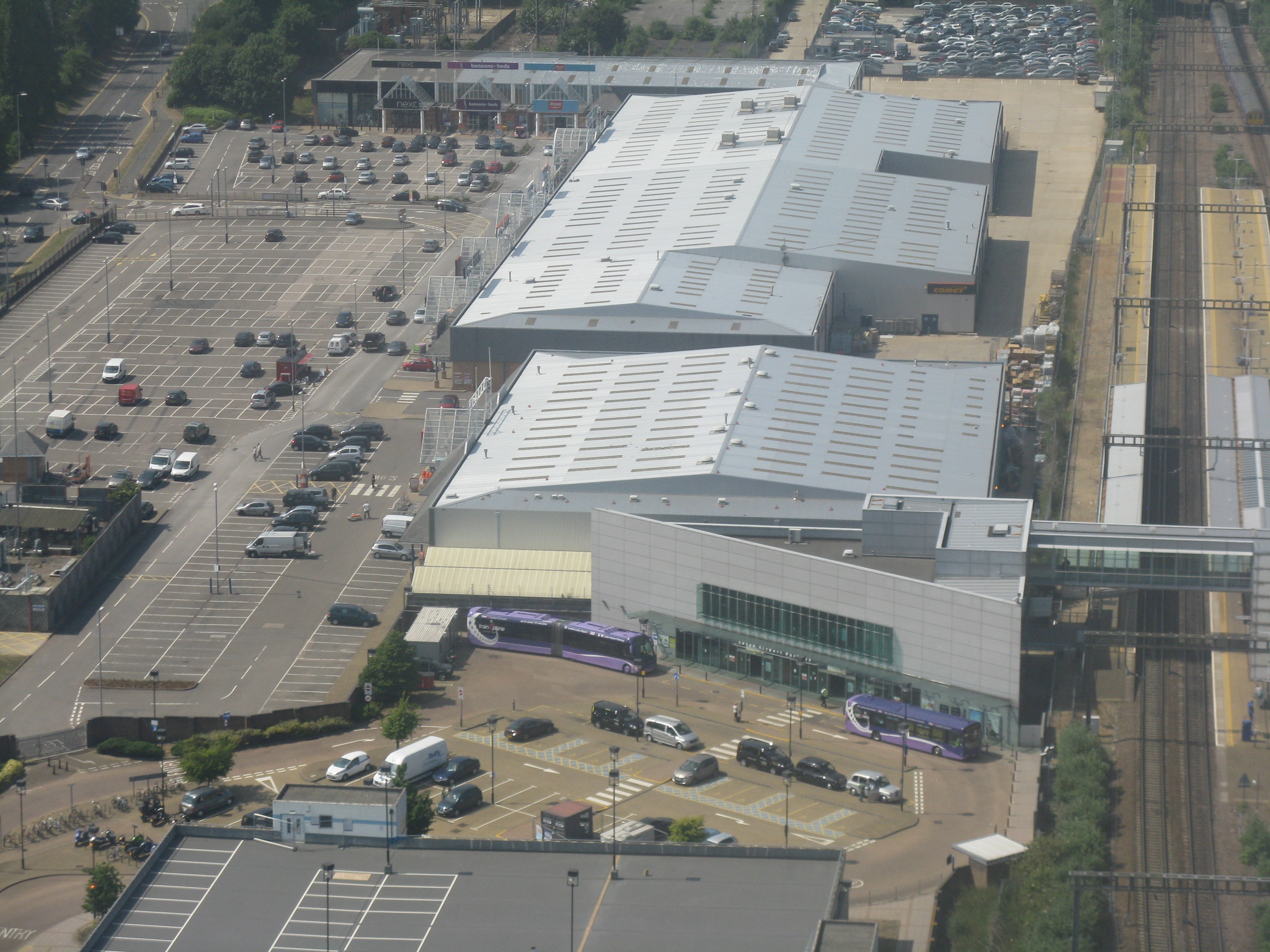
- Aerial photo of Luton Retail Park, with part of the station on the right, and the former airport shuttle buses waiting at the bottom
- Interactive map of Luton Airport Parkway

General information
- Location: Park Town, Luton
- Local authority: Borough of Luton
- Grid reference: TL105205
- Managed by: Thameslink
- Station code: LTN
- DfT category: D
- Number of platforms: 6 (4 National Rail; 2 Luton DART)
- Accessible: Yes

National Rail annual entry and exit
- 2020–21: ▼0.694 million
- Interchange: ▼25,227
- 2021–22: ▲1.991 million
- Interchange: ▲74,151
- 2022–23: ▲3.768 million
- Interchange: ▼5,783
- 2023–24: ▲4.344 million
- Interchange: ▲6,576
- 2024–25: ▲4.741 million
- Interchange: ▲7,632

Key dates
- 21 November 1999: Mainline station opened
- 27 March 2023: DART station opened

Other information
- External links: Departures; Facilities

Luton Airport Parkway station is on the Midland Main Line in England, serving south Luton and Luton Airport in Bedfordshire. The station is situated in Luton's Park Town district, being 29.27 miles (47.11 km) from London St Pancras between Harpenden to the south and Luton to the north. Its three-letter station code is LTN, also the IATA code for the airport.

The station is served by Thameslink operated trains on the Thameslink route and by East Midlands Railway Connect services to Corby and limited Intercity services to Nottingham and Sheffield. From May 2029, the station could also be served by Grand Central services to/from Manchester Piccadilly; track applications are currently pending review by the ORR.

It is situated approximately 1 mile (1.6 km) west of the airport. Luton DART, a light rail/people mover transit, links the station to the airport terminal.

== History ==
The Bedford–London section of the Midland Main Line was opened on 1 October 1868 by the Midland Railway to provide a new direct route into London St Pancras. The Midland Main Line had stations in the Luton area at Luton, Chiltern Green and Harpenden.

Luton Municipal Airport was opened on 16 July 1938 by the Secretary of State for Air, Kingsley Wood. During World War Two, the airport served as an RAF base for No. 264 Squadron RAF, but the airport returned to civilian use after the war. From the 1950s and 1960s, the airport's business increased with the growth of the package holiday market (later assisted by a popular 1977 television advert for Campari featuring Lorraine Chase which mentioned the airport). The nearest railway station to Luton Airport was Luton railway station, approximately 2 miles (3.2 km) away in Luton town centre; although the Midland Main Line line passed close to Luton Airport, for the first 60 years of the airport's operation there was no dedicated railway station. To support the increasing passenger traffic, Luton Airport provided a shuttle bus service from Luton to the airport terminal.

In 1999, Luton Airport Parkway was opened. Although it was designed specifically to serve Luton Airport, it was also given the parkway name, a title applied to British railway stations that have been designed as a park and ride railway station with motorists in mind, providing car parking facilities for commuters travelling onwards into London. Because the parkway station was located approximately 1 mile (1.6 km) to the west of Luton Airport, and airport was at the top of a hill, it was still necessary to link to the airport with shuttle buses. Initially these were operated by National Car Parks on behalf of the airport's owners and provided passengers with a free transfer. In January 2008 the free shuttle bus service was replaced by a more frequent, but chargeable, service provided by First Capital Connect.

With the opening of the cross-London Thameslink route 11 years earlier, the new station provided a direct rail link from Luton Airport to central and south London, Gatwick Airport and Brighton, as well as the Midland Mainline Routes to the East Midlands. In November 2008, the station became the first on the Thameslink route to have its platforms extended in order to accommodate twelve-coach trains as part of the Thameslink Programme. In April 2013, a new northern entrance was opened on Kimpton Road, Luton.

Contactless bank cards (but not Oyster cards) became valid for journeys to and from London from October 2019.

== Services ==
=== Rail services ===
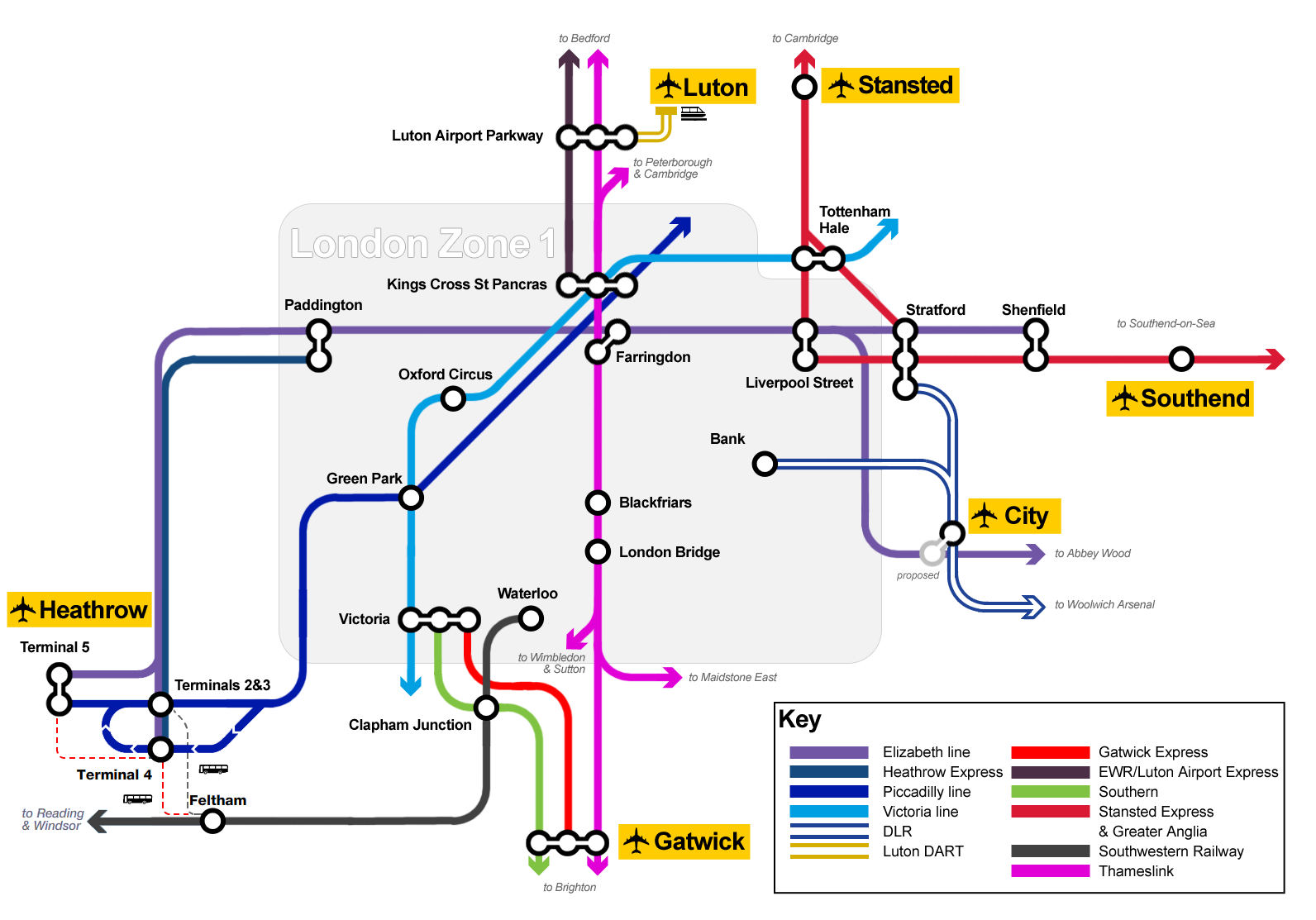
Map of London airport Tube and rail connections

Services at Luton Airport Parkway are operated by East Midlands Railway and Thameslink mostly using Class 360 and 700 EMUs.

East Midlands Railway

East Midlands Railway runs most of their services under the EMR Connect / Luton Airport Express banner, after it became an official separate brand in 2023.

The typical off-peak service in trains per hour is:

- 2 tph to London St Pancras International
- 2 tph to Corby

On Sundays only, a limited number of intercity East Midlands Railway services between Nottingham and Sheffield and London St Pancras International call at the station using Class 222 DMUs.

On Weekdays, a very limited early morning and late evening service between Derby and Nottingham and London St Pancras International calls at the station.

Thameslink

The typical off-peak service in trains per hour is:

- 6 tph to Luton of which 4 continue to Bedford
- 2 tph to Brighton via Gatwick Airport
- 2 tph to Three Bridges via Redhill
- 2 tph to Rainham via Dartford

During the peak hours, the station is served by additional services to and from Orpington, Sutton, East Grinstead and Littlehampton.

Thameslink also operate a half-hourly night service between Bedford and Three Bridges on Sunday to Friday nights.

| Preceding station | National Rail | Following station |
|---|---|---|
| Luton | East Midlands Railway Connect / Luton Airport Express | London St Pancras International |
| Luton | Thameslink Thameslink | Harpenden |
| Preceding station | Luton DART | Following station |
| Terminus | DART | Luton Airport Terminal |

=== Proposed services ===
==== Manchester Piccadilly to London St Pancras ====
Grand Central applied in June 2026 for up to 5 daily direct return services between Manchester Piccadilly and London St Pancras calling at Stockport, Macclesfield, Congleton, Stoke‑on‑Trent, Uttoxeter, Derby, Loughborough, Leicester, Wellingborough and Luton Airport Parkway (set down/pick up only).

The proposal responds to a number of gaps and issues in the current railway offering. GC said its proposed offer “addresses a clear gap in the network” by linking the North West and East Midlands. It also argues that serving Uttoxeter would enable direct rail access to the UK’s largest theme park, Alton Towers, from London and Manchester, and has the resort’s backing.

GC also argues that its application “seeks to make pragmatic use” of off-peak Midland Main Line (MML) capacity, a route it said is “materially less constrained”.

The proposed service could start in May 2029.

| Preceding station | National Rail | Following station |
|---|---|---|
| Wellingborough | Grand Central; Manchester-London; Proposed service | London St Pancras International |

=== Luton DART ===
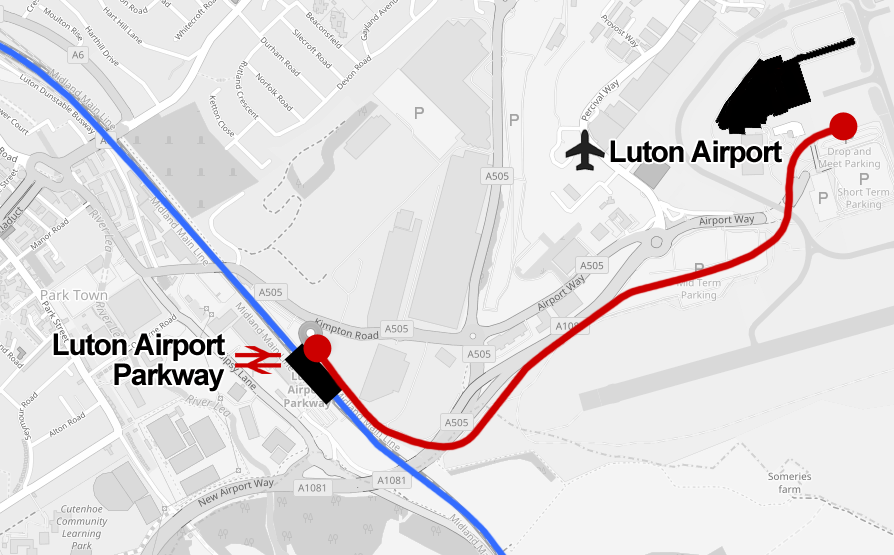
Map of the Luton DART airport transit

Luton DART, a 1.4-mile (2.3 km) light rail/ automated guided people mover line, provides a five-minute transfer between Luton Airport Parkway station and Luton Airport. It operates 24 hours a day. The DART platforms are located in a terminus building above the Parkway station, connected to the main-line rail platforms via lifts and escalators and a footbridge.

The DART transit was officially opened by King Charles III in December 2022. It opened to passengers on 10 March 2023 and has replaced the shuttle bus service.

The single fare for the DART is £4.90. Rail tickets marked "Luton Airport" include the price of the DART transit. Concessions are given to Luton residents, and free travel is provided for holders of concessionary travel passes and disabled blue badge holders, and for airport workers.

=== Bus services ===
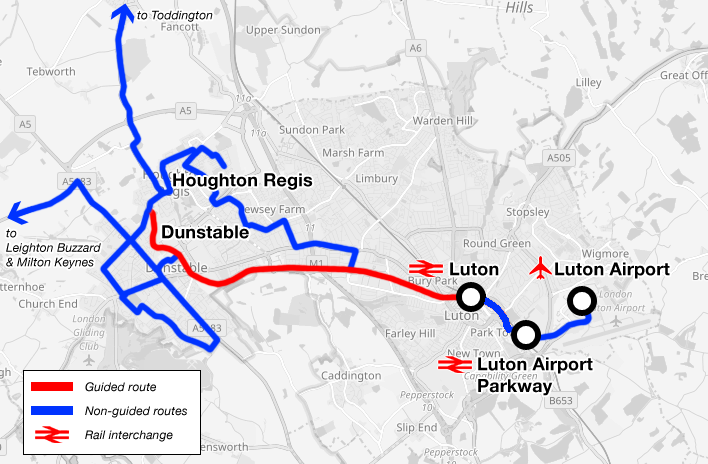
Luton to Dunstable Busway route

The station is served by Arriva buses A, H, X2, X3, Z and 100 between the town centre and airport from the DART's Kimpton Road exit. The main entrance is served by the more rural Centrebus routes 230, 366, 44 and 45 as well as Grant Palmer's 30.

Until March 2023 a dedicated airport shuttle bus service was in operation to convey air passengers from the Parkway station to the airport terminal. The single fare was £2.40, and the return fare was £3.80. Rail tickets marked "Luton Airport" included the bus fare. The shuttle bus has now been replaced by the Luton DART light rail transit.

== Station facilities ==
- Four platforms
- Four waiting rooms
- Newsagent/Cafe
- Telephones
- ATM
- Ticket barriers
- FastTicket machine
- Toilets
- Multistorey car park
- Free 20 minute wait car park
- The station participates in the Plusbus scheme where train and bus tickets can be bought together for a cheaper price. It is in the same town as Luton and Leagrave stations.
Station facilities

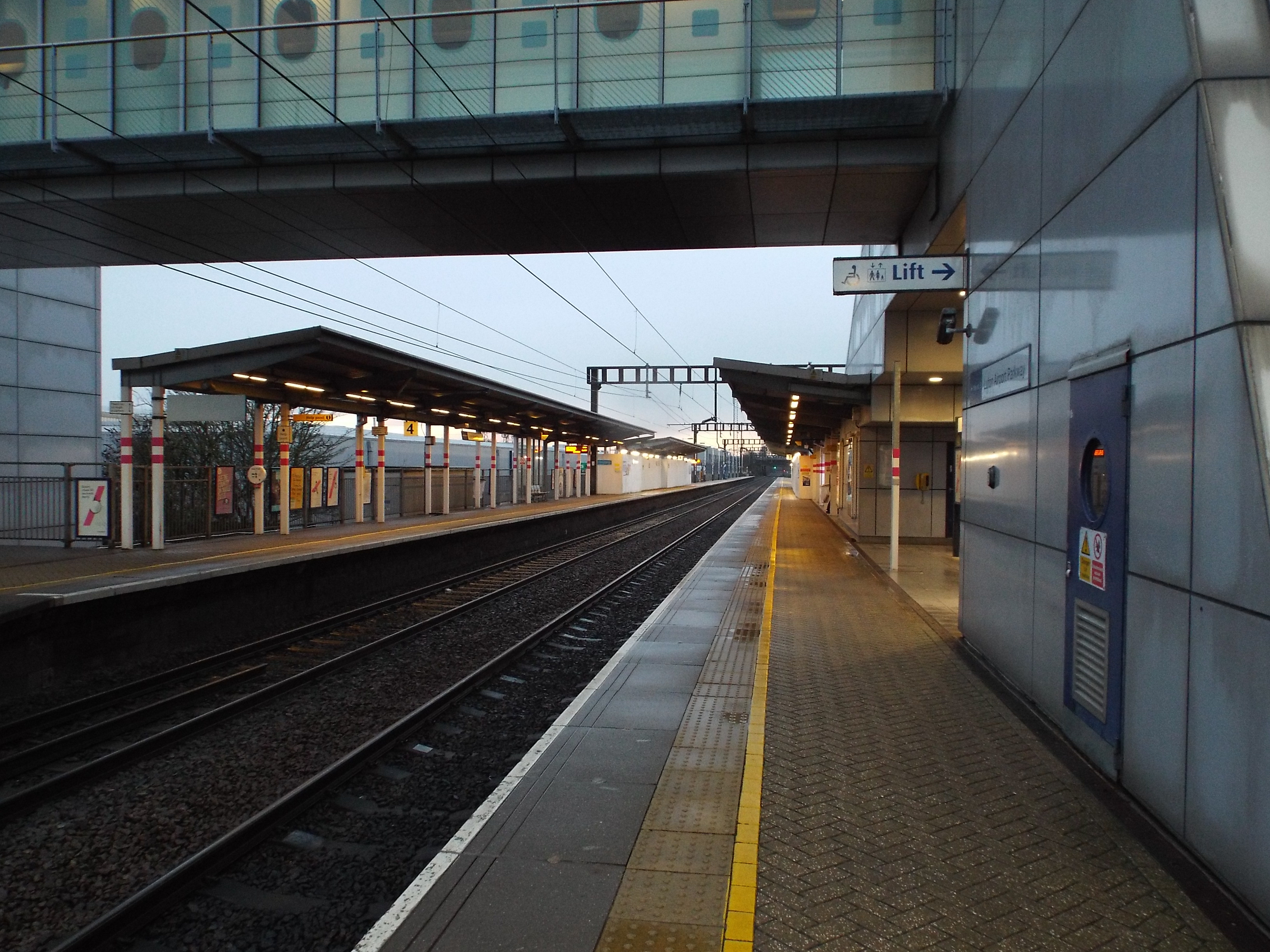
The mainline platforms

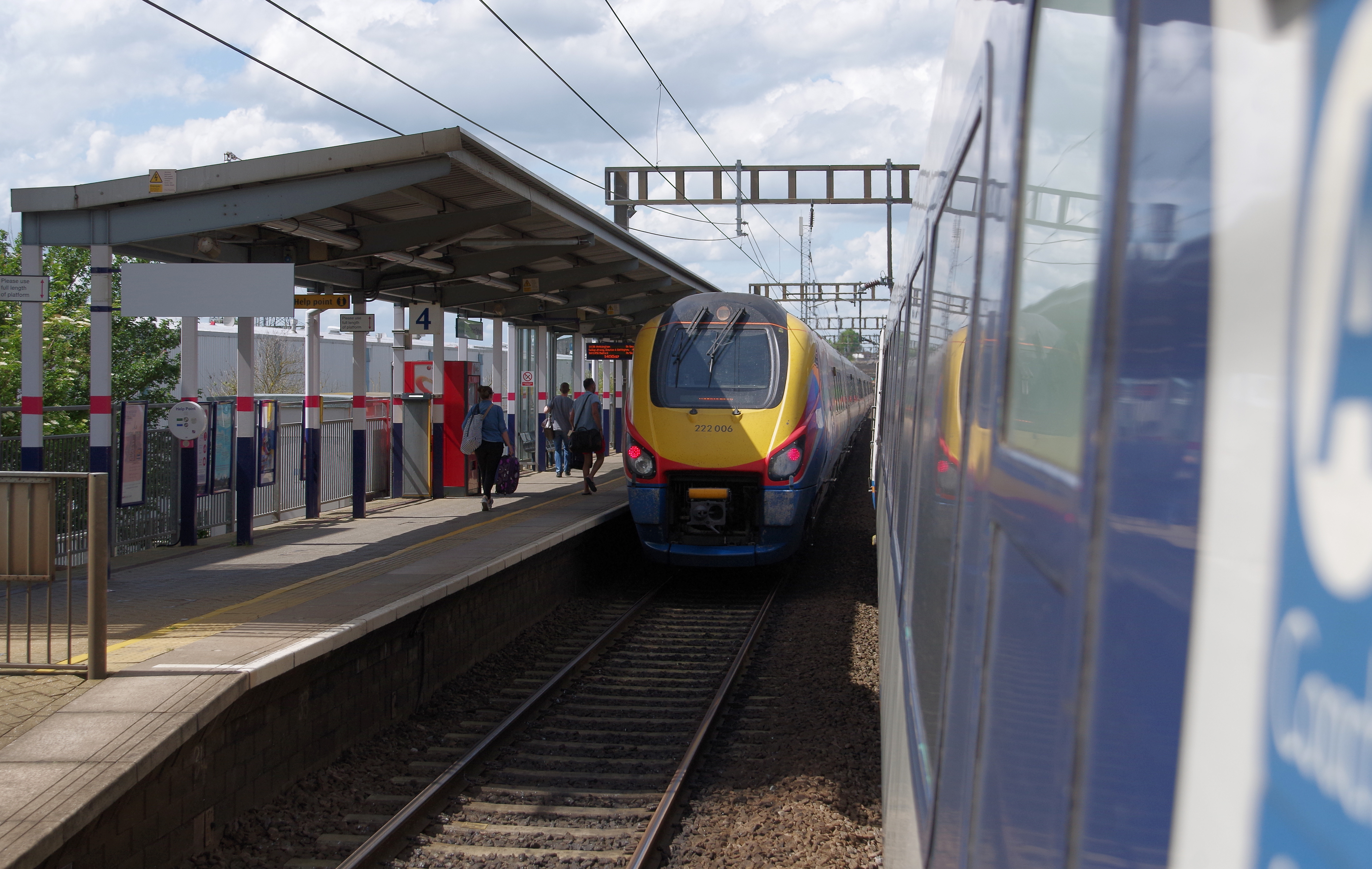
The mainline platforms

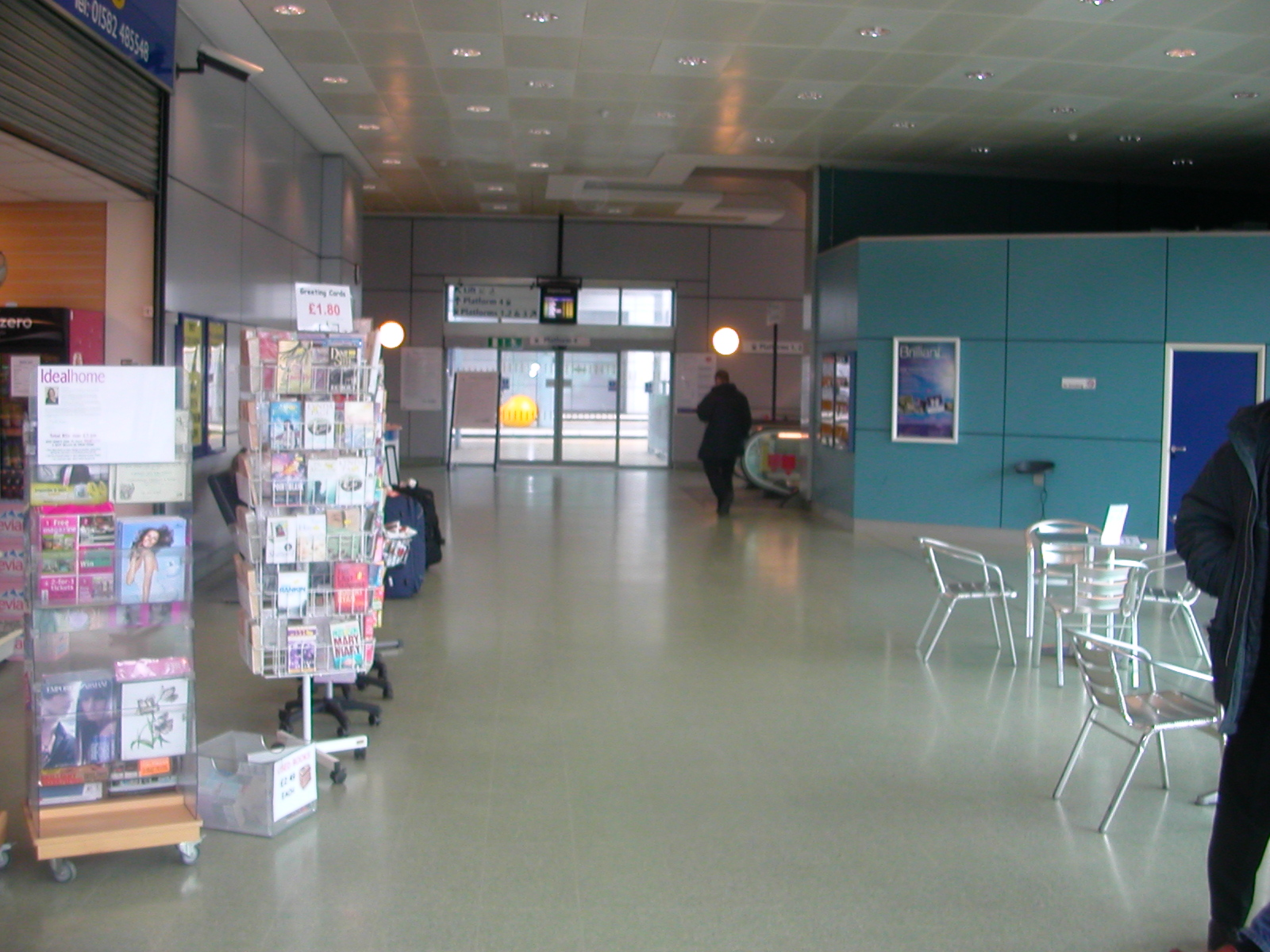
Intermediate-level concourse adjacent to Platform 4

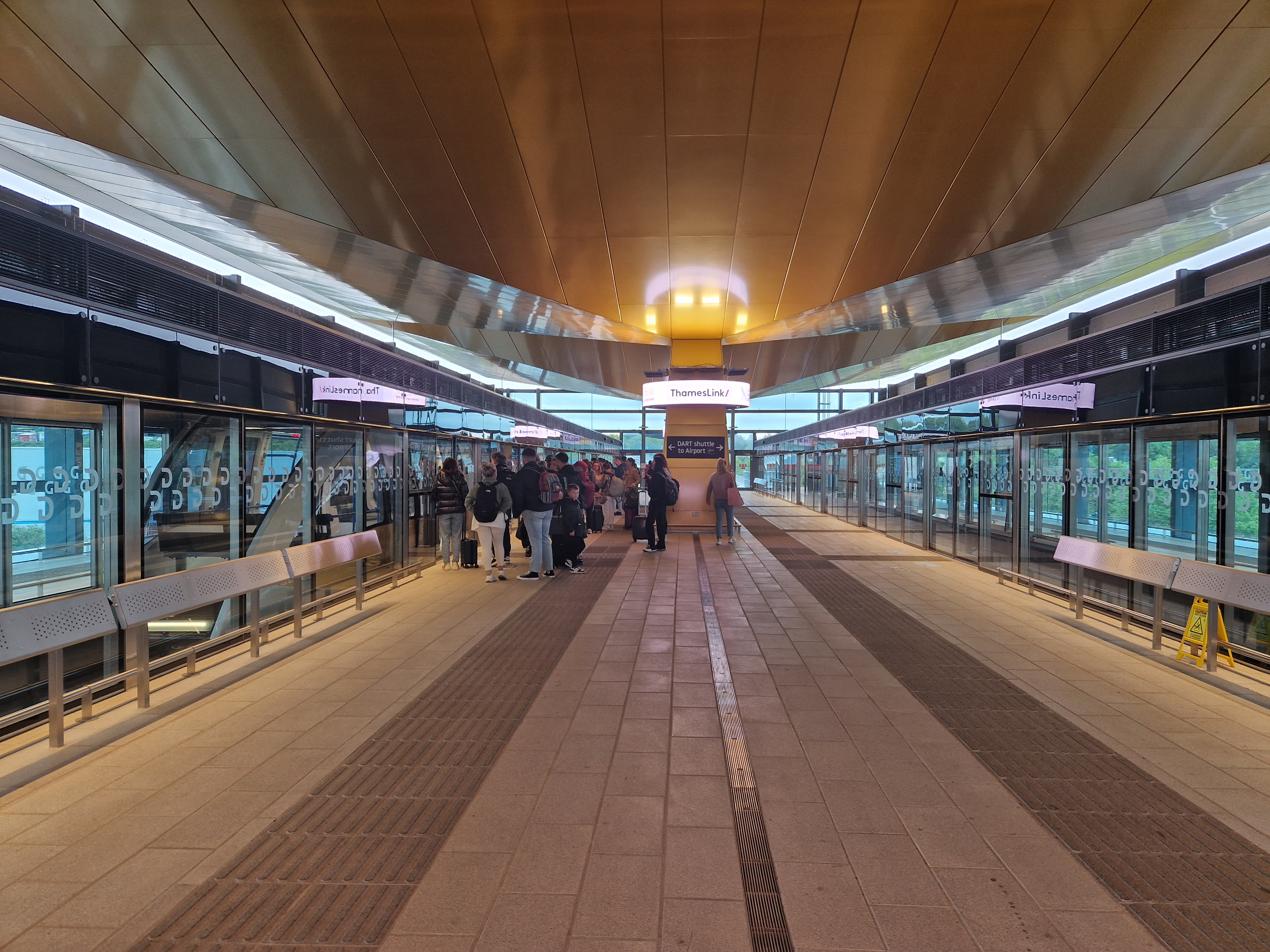
The DART airport shuttle platforms

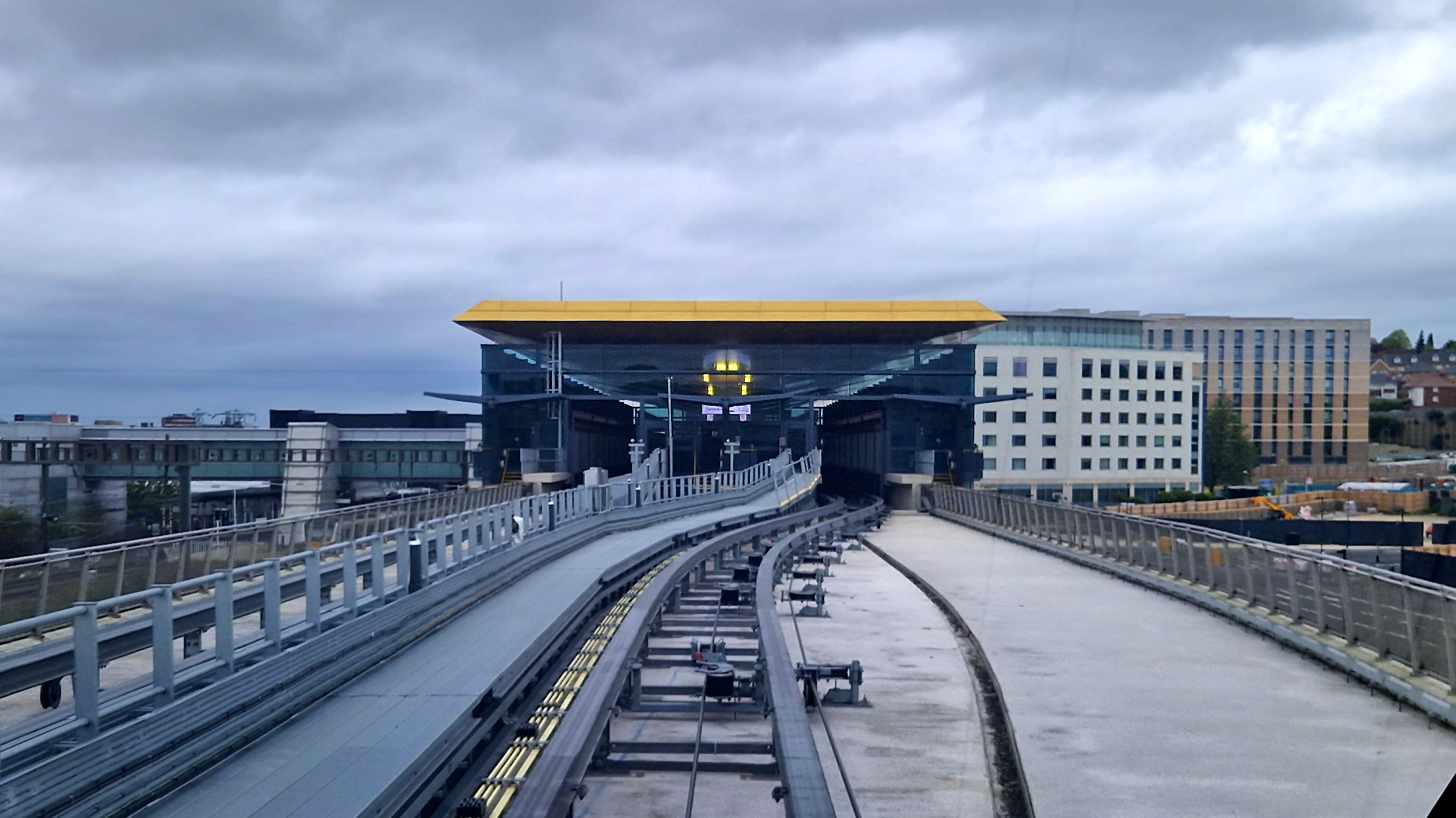
Luton DART shuttle terminal
