= Leagrave (disambiguation) =

Leagrave is a village in Bedfordshire, England.

Leagrave may also refer to:

- Leagrave Bench, a style of traditional furniture
- Leagrave Railway Station
