= Harpenden railway station =

National Rail station in Hertfordshire, England

Harpenden
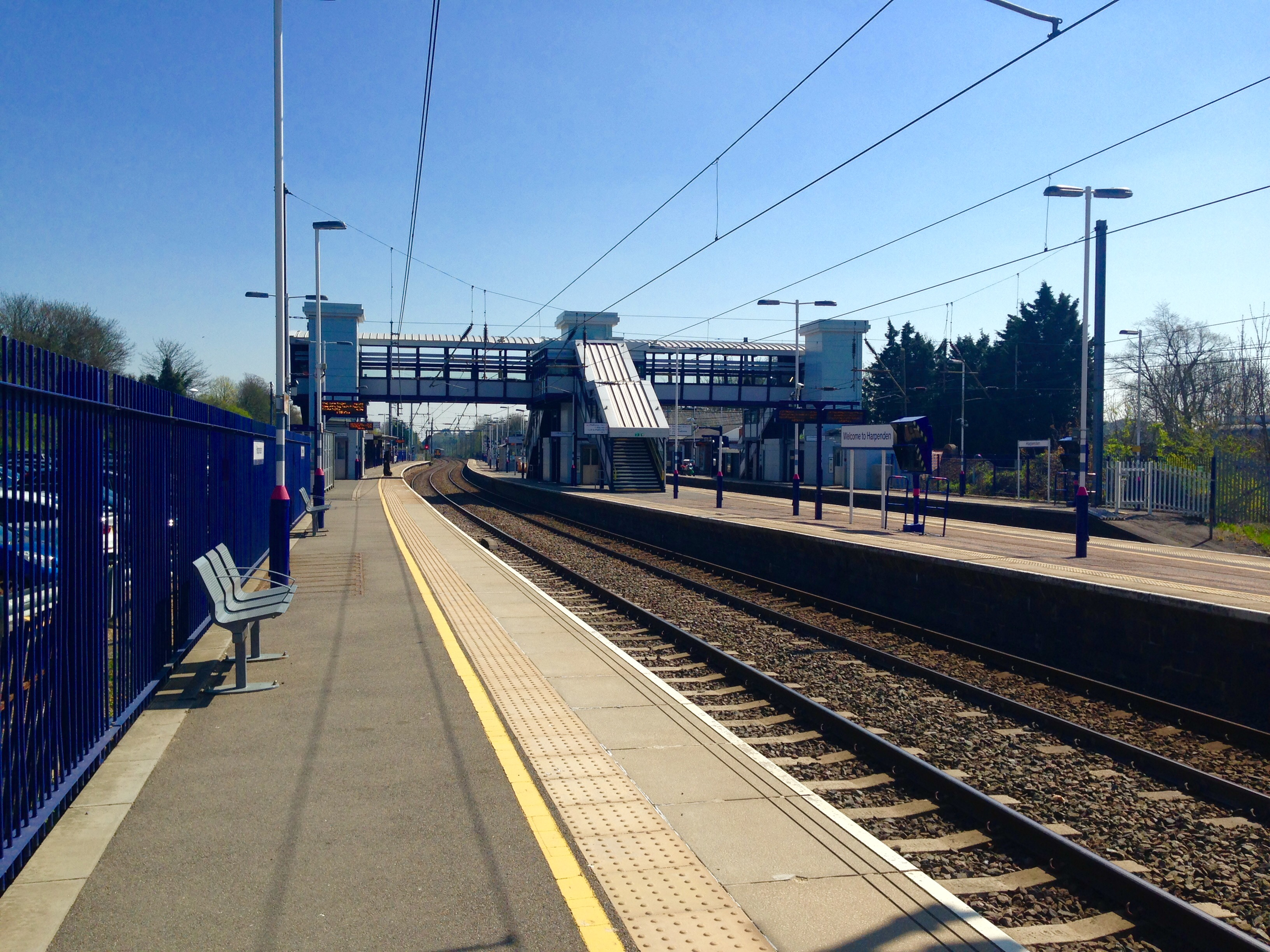
- Facing South from platform 1 (Southbound) at Harpenden

General information
- Location: Harpenden, City of St Albans
- Coordinates: 51.815°N 0.352°W
- Grid reference: TL137142
- Manager: Thameslink
- Platforms: 4

Construction
- Accessible: yes

Other information
- Station code: HPD
- Classification: DfT category D

Key dates
- 1868: Opened

Passengers
- 2020/21: ▼0.495 million
- Interchange: ▼1,152
- 2021/22: ▲1.616 million
- Interchange: ▲3,027
- 2022/23: ▲2.346 million
- Interchange: ▲3,861
- 2023/24: ▲2.644 million
- Interchange: ▲4,340
- 2024/25: ▲2.806 million
- Interchange: ▲5,806
Location
- Location within Hertfordshire

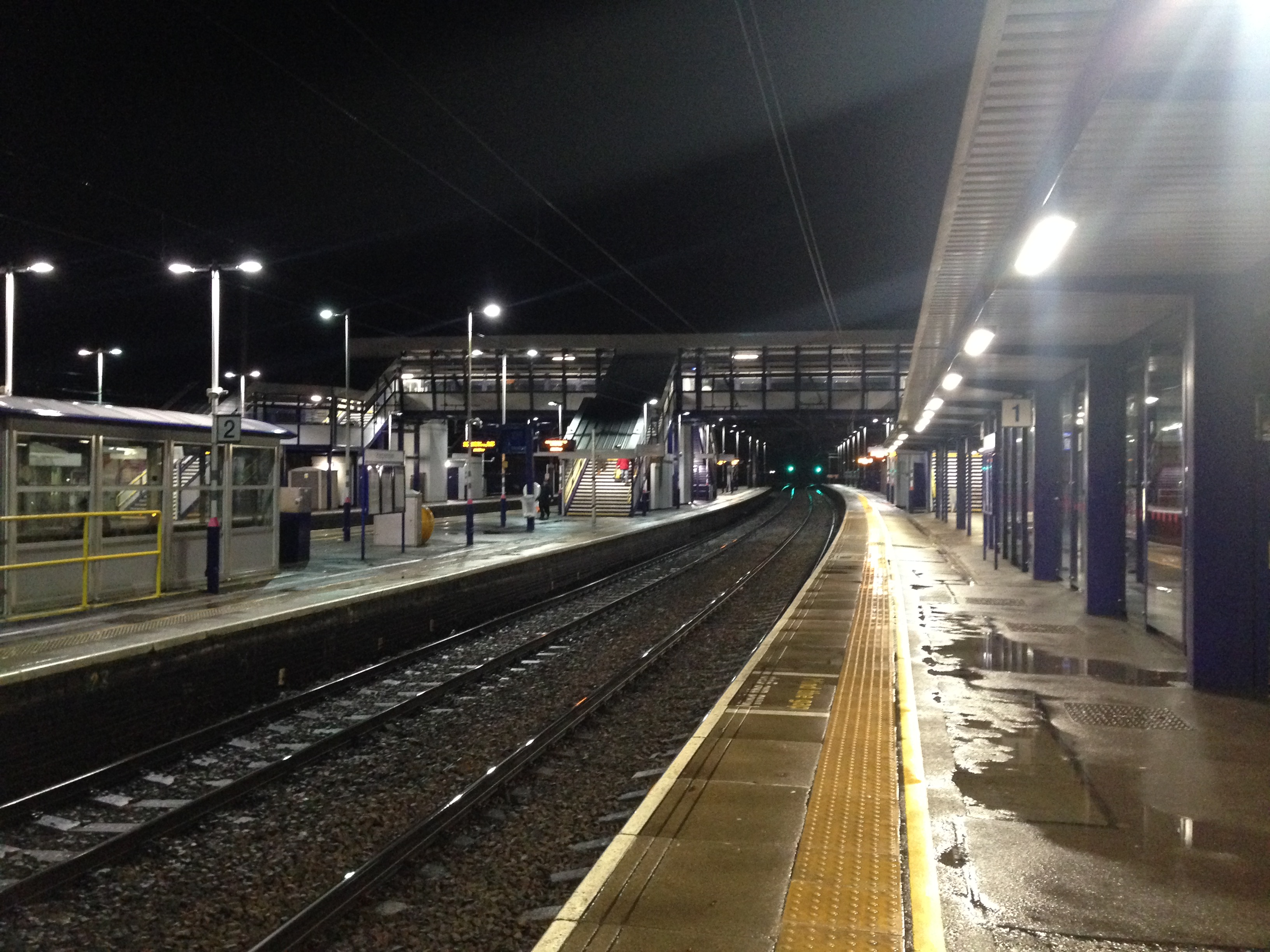
Harpenden station at night

Harpenden railway station is on the Midland Main Line in England, serving the town of Harpenden, Hertfordshire. It is 24 miles 51 chains (39.7 km) down the line from London St Pancras and is situated between St Albans City to the south and Luton Airport Parkway to the north. Its three-letter station code is HPD.

The station is served by Govia Thameslink-operated trains on the Thameslink route.

== History ==
Harpenden was the second station built in the town, by the Midland Railway in 1868 on its extension to St. Pancras. Nothing remains of the original station buildings. Although located on Station Road, the road is actually named after the first station, Harpenden East, which was built in 1860 and closed in 1965.

A branch line, built by the Hemel Hempstead Railway Company in 1877, known as the Nickey Line but operated by the Midland, formerly diverged from the main line north of the station. The intention had been to meet the LNWR at Boxmoor, but the section from Hemel Hempstead never had a passenger service. In 1886, a south curve was added to the junction allowing passengers to join the London trains at Harpenden rather than Luton. The branch was closed in 1979, but the route remains in use as a cycleway, passing under the M1 in a tunnel.

A row of five brick built former coal merchant's offices along the station approach are now used as small retail and office units.

=== Stationmasters ===
Alfred King, station master from 1920 to 1927, committed suicide at age 53 on 29 March 1927 by lying on the rails in front of an express train. The inquest found that he had been suffering from depression and delusions for a long time.

- Joseph Vizall Bendall 1870 - 1872 (formerly station master at Ketton, afterwards station master at Cheltenham)
- George Salmon 1872 - 1899 (formerly station master at Irchester)
- Horace E. Horne 1899 - 1907 (afterwards station master at Cheltenham)
- E. Jones 1907 - 1920 (formerly station master at Higham Ferrers, afterwards station master at St Albans)
- Alfred John King 1920 - 1927 (formerly station master at Raunds and Olney)
- E. Goode until 1932
- F.C. Cooper 1932 - 1942 (afterwards station master at Bath)

== Facilities ==
The station has toilets, a newsagent, dry cleaner, taxi office and rank, and a coffee shop.

The station also has ticket machines on both sides of the station.

The station has a PlusBus scheme where train and bus tickets can be bought together for a cheaper price.

All four platforms have been extended to support 12-carriage trains, as part of the Thameslink programme; this also required the widening of a road bridge. Work on these started on 21 November 2010 and was completed in May 2011. The construction of a new footbridge, with lifts for disabled access, has been completed and links up all four platforms. The east side of the station (platform 1 side) has two entrances, both with ticket gates to ease congestion during peak times. The west side entrance is where the ticket office is located, but it also has ticket machines.

An extra deck of parking spaces is planned to be built on top of the existing east side car park. When completed, it will add an extra 200 parking spaces.

== Services ==
=== Service history ===
==== 2006/07 services ====
The typical off-peak service pattern saw six trains per hour in each direction, operated by First Capital Connect. Four of these were fast trains between Bedford and Brighton, via King's Cross Thameslink station in central London and Gatwick Airport. The remaining two trains called at all stations between Luton and Sutton (in South London).

==== December 2007 ====
Following the closure of King's Cross Thameslink station, trains on the Thameslink route now operate between Bedford, Luton, Sutton and Brighton calling at the new low level platforms at St Pancras.

==== 2009 ====
From March 2009, First Capital Connect, in partnership with Southeastern, began running a Luton-Sevenoaks service, which called at Harpenden.

=== Current Services ===
All services at Harpenden are operated by Thameslink using Class 700 EMUs.

The typical off-peak service in trains per hour is:

- 6 tph to Luton of which 4 continue to Bedford
- 2 tph to Brighton
- 2 tph to Three Bridges via Redhill
- 2 tph to Rainham via Dartford

During the peak hours, the station is served by additional services to and from Orpington and East Grinstead.

The station is also served by a half-hourly night service between Bedford and Three Bridges on Sunday to Friday nights.

Preceding station	National Rail	Following station
Luton Airport Parkway	Thameslink Thameslink	St Albans City
	Disused railways	
Roundwood Halt Line and station closed	Midland Railway Nickey Line	Terminus

== Gallery ==
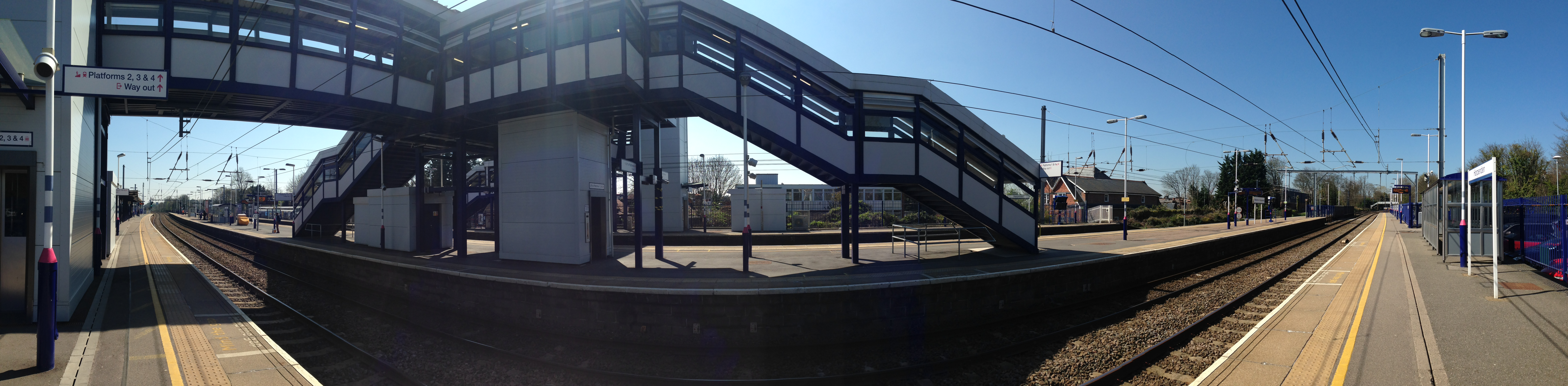
Panorama of Harpenden station from north end of platform 1 during the day
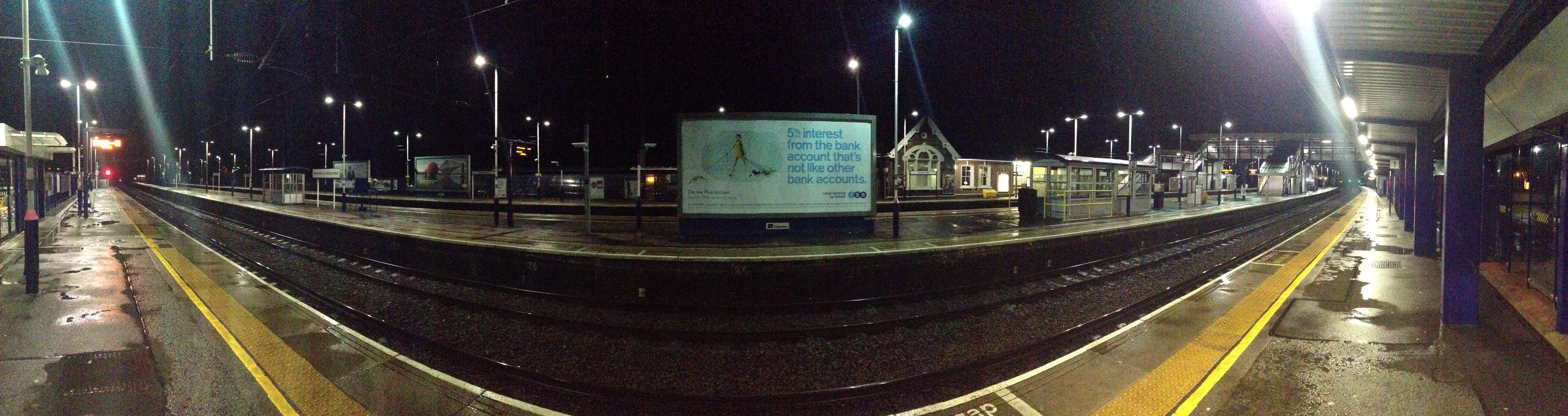
Panorama of Harpenden station from south end of platform 1 at night

== Sources ==
- Butt, R. V. J. (October 1995). The Directory of Railway Stations: details every public and private passenger station, halt, platform and stopping place, past and present (1st ed.). Sparkford: Patrick Stephens Ltd. ISBN 978-1-85260-508-7. OCLC 60251199. OL 11956311M.
