= Earlswood railway station (Surrey) =

Railway station in Surrey, England

Earlswood
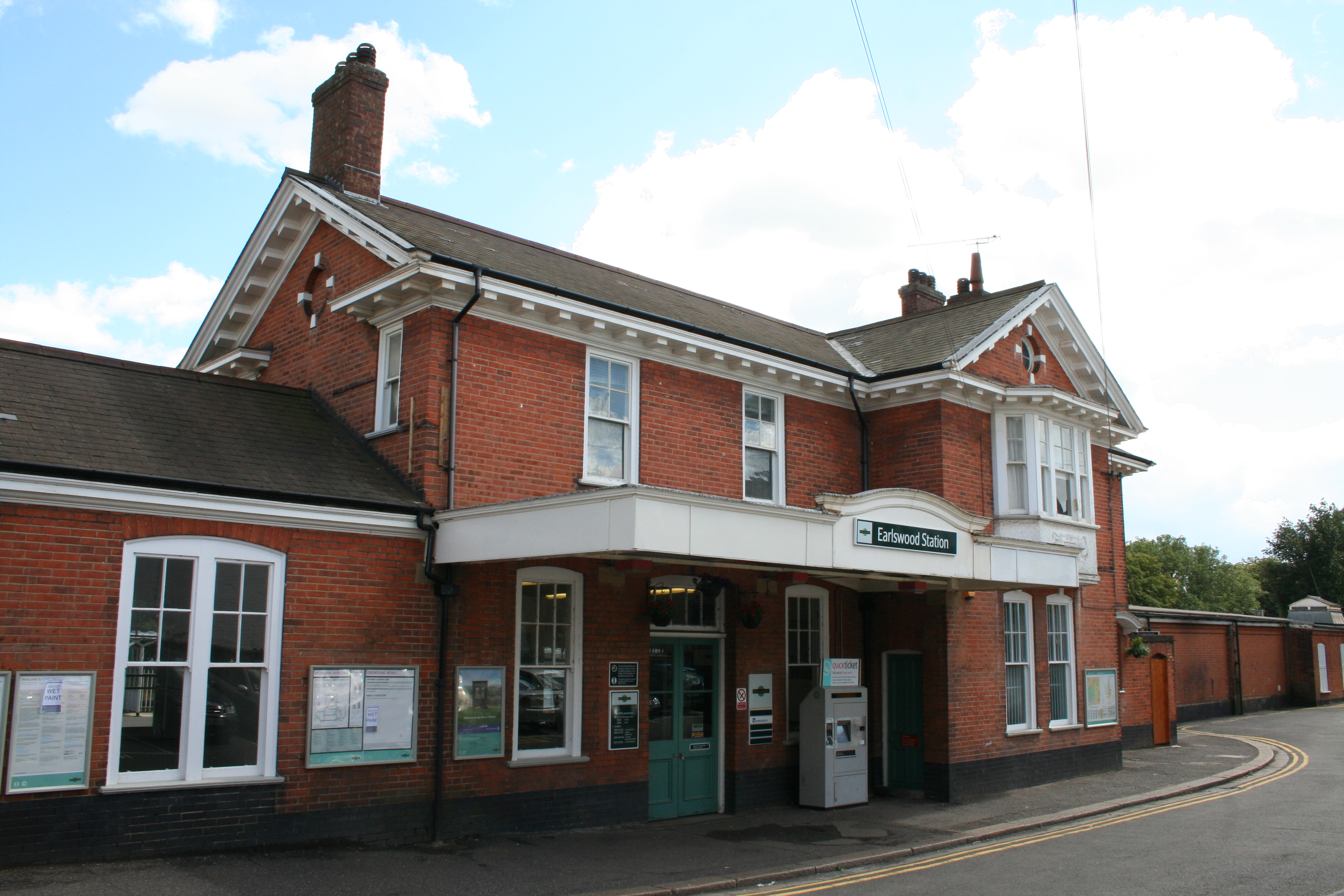
- Interactive map of Earlswood

General information
- Location: Earlswood
- Local authority: Reigate and Banstead
- Grid reference: TQ278491
- Managed by: Southern
- Station code: ELD
- DfT category: E
- Number of platforms: 2
- Tracks: 4
- Accessible: Yes, Northbound only
- Fare zone: D

National Rail annual entry and exit
- 2020–21: ▼80,584
- 2021–22: ▲0.196 million
- 2022–23: ▲0.273 million
- 2023–24: ▲0.303 million
- 2024–25: ▲0.352 million

Railway companies
- Original company: London, Brighton and South Coast Railway
- Pre-grouping: London, Brighton and South Coast Railway
- Post-grouping: Southern Railway

Key dates
- 1 August 1868: Station opened

Other information
- External links: Departures; Facilities
- Coordinates: 51°13′37″N 0°10′16″W

Earlswood railway station serves Earlswood, south of Redhill, in Surrey, England. It is on the Brighton Main Line, 21 miles 50 chains (34.8 km) down the line from London Bridge via Redhill and south of the junction between the Redhill line and the Quarry line. Train services are provided by Thameslink and Southern.

== History ==
Earlswood station was opened by the London Brighton and South Coast Railway on 1 August 1868. The station was rebuilt with four platforms in 1906 at the time of the quadrupling of the main line. The platforms on the fast lines were closed in the 1980s.

On 11 January 2016, payment using Oyster and contactless payment cards was introduced at the station, as part of the Oyster extension from Merstham to Gatwick Airport. The station is outside the London Fare Zone area, and special fares apply.

Some Oyster photocards (as well as Freedom Passes) are not valid here: the nearest station that these cards can be used is Coulsdon South, only in the northbound direction.

== Services ==
Off-peak, all services at Earlswood are operated by Thameslink using Class 700 EMUs.

The typical off-peak service in trains per hour is:

- 2 tph to Bedford via London Bridge
- 2 tph to Three Bridges

During the peak hours, the station is served by an additional half-hourly Southern service between London Victoria and Gatwick Airport.

On Sundays, the service is reduced to hourly but southbound services are extended beyond Three Bridges to and from Horsham.

| Preceding station | National Rail | Following station |
|---|---|---|
| Redhill | Thameslink Brighton Main Line | Salfords |
| Redhill | Southern Brighton Main Line Peak Hours Only | Salfords |
