= Gatwick Airport Up sidings =

Train stabling point in Crawley, West Sussex

Gatwick Airport Up Sidings
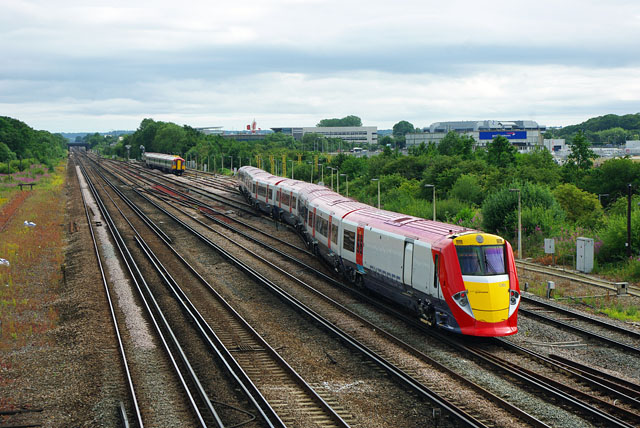
- A Gatwick Express Class 460 entering the sidings

Location
- Location: London Gatwick Airport, Crawley
- Coordinates: 51.1497°N 0.1612°W
- OS grid: TQ287405

Characteristics
- Owner: Network Rail
- Type: Passenger or freight

Gatwick Airport Up sidings are located near London Gatwick Airport, Crawley, England, situated on the Brighton Main Line south of Gatwick Airport station. The sidings are accessed from the Up Platform Loop line.

== Present ==
All train operating companies whose trains operate on the Brighton Main Line can use the sidings. Those which can regularly be seen include: Class 387 and Class 442 EMUs.
