= Luton railway station =

Railway station in Bedfordshire, England

Coordinates: 51.88227°N 0.41432°W

Luton
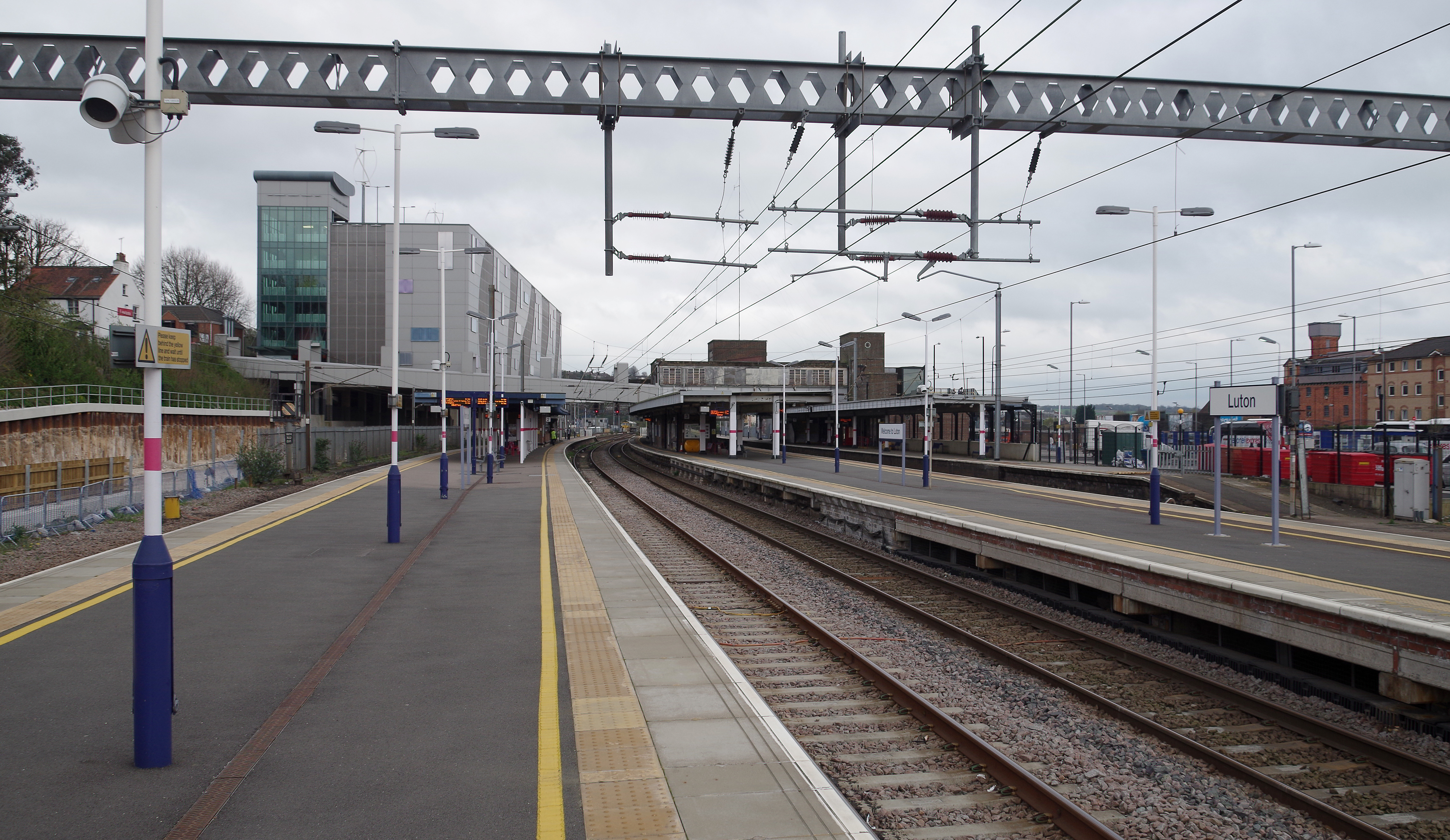
- Facing south from platform 2

General information
- Location: Luton, Bedfordshire; England
- Grid reference: TL092216
- Owner: Network Rail
- Manager: Greater Thameslink Railway
- Platforms: 5

Construction
- Parking: Yes
- Cycle facilities: Yes
- Accessible: Platform 5 only (Lifts under construction)

Other information
- Station code: LUT
- Classification: DfT category B

History
- Opened: 1868
- Original company: Midland Railway

Passengers
- 2020/21: ▼1.107 million
- Interchange: ▼22,211
- 2021/22: ▲2.417 million
- Interchange: ▲48,344
- 2022/23: ▲3.282 million
- Interchange: ▲51,288
- 2023/24: ▲3.646 million
- Interchange: ▼50,864
- 2024/25: ▲3.666 million
- Interchange: ▲73,669
Location
Notes
- Passenger statistics from the Office of Rail and Road

Luton railway station is located in Luton, Bedfordshire, England, approximately 0.5 miles (0.8 km) north of the town centre. It is situated on the Midland Main Line, 30 miles (48 km) from London St Pancras. Services are provided by Thameslink and East Midlands Railway.

It is one of three railway stations in Luton, with the others being Leagrave to the north and Luton Airport Parkway to the south.

== History ==
Luton station was built by the Midland Railway in 1868 on its extension to St. Pancras. For some years, it was known as Luton Midland Road to distinguish it from the earlier Luton Bute Street station, which was built in 1858 on the GNR line from Hertford North to Leighton Buzzard.

A public area, known as the Great Moor, had to be built through; the remainder of the land was bought for development by John Crawley, who provided a replacement in what is known as the People's Park. This proved a worthwhile investment because, as the town's staple trade in straw hats diminished as they went out of fashion, it was replaced by engineering works. By the beginning of the twentieth century, the population had nearly trebled and the station had become an important stop for main line expresses.

=== London, Midland and Scottish Railway ===
The station, consisting of three platforms, was rebuilt in 1939 to the designs of the London, Midland and Scottish Railway company architect William Henry Hamlyn.

=== British Rail era ===
In 1960, a fourth platform was added. During electrification in the early 1980s, a fifth platform was added for the suburban services to and from St. Pancras.

In May 1988, Thameslink was launched, introducing direct trains from Luton to destinations such as Brighton, Gatwick Airport and Sevenoaks.

=== Privatisation ===
Upon the opening of Eurostar at St. Pancras International, through-fares to continental Europe were made available from Luton and 67 other UK towns and cities to Paris, Brussels and other destinations in France and Belgium.

In 2009, the station was identified as one of the ten worst category B interchange stations for mystery shopper assessment of fabric and environment; it was set to receive a share of £50 million funding for improvements. During 2010 and 2011, a number of improvements were implemented at the station; these included extensions to all five platforms (including removing the barrow crossing) and a new footbridge. The platform extensions formed part of the Thameslink Programme and allowed 12-coach operation at the station. During these works, two new rail overbridges were installed over Old Bedford Road allowing the track to be slewed for the extended platforms.

In February 2026, long-awaited work began on a second footbridge at the western end of the station, which will allow for all platforms to be accessible by lift. The station had first been promised lifts in 2006.

=== Re-nationalisation ===
On 31 May 2026, Thameslink services were brought back into public ownership through the gradual launch of Great British Railways.

=== Accidents and incidents ===
There have been two accidents at Luton, one in 1955, the other in 1976:

==== 1955 accident ====
Luton rail crash

Details
- Date: 22 December 1955; 19:56
- Location: Luton railway station
- Country: England
- Line: Midland Main Line
- Cause: Signal passed at danger

Statistics
- Trains: 2
- Deaths: 1
- Injured: 23

On 22 December 1955, two passenger trains collided at Luton station. One passenger was killed, and 23 injured. The first train, a local service from St Pancras to Leicester, had been given the "right away" from Luton and started to leave the station, but came to a halt when some late passengers attempted to board. As the train was clear of the Home signal, the signalman accepted the second train, an express from St Pancras to Derby. The signals were left at "Danger", so the Derby train should have stopped at the Home signal until the Leicester train had left the station. However, the driver of the Derby train failed to observe the Distant signal, and only made an emergency brake application when he saw the Home signal at danger, from a distance of approximately 400 yards (370 m). He was unable to stop the train in time, and it collided with the stationary Leicester train. The rear two coaches of the Leicester train telescoped into each other, causing the majority of casualties. The official enquiry held the driver of the Derby train responsible for the collision, but also noted that the lights from the nearby Vauxhall factory obscured the view of the Distant signal. The lighting was reorganised following the accident.

==== 1976 accident ====
Luton rail crash

Details
- Date: 25 June 1976
- Location: Luton railway station
- Country: England
- Line: Midland Main Line
- Cause: Signal passed at danger

Statistics
- Trains: 3

A passenger train being operated by a diesel multiple unit overran signals and collided with another diesel multiple unit at Luton South Signal Box. An express passenger train then collided with the wreckage, striking it with a glancing blow.

== Facilities ==
The station participates in the Plusbus scheme where train and bus tickets can be bought together for a cheaper price. It is in the same area as Luton Airport Parkway and Leagrave stations. FastTicket machines are used at this station. Thameslink has proposed closing the ticket office.

Facilities at the station include two waiting rooms, a newsagent, a cash machine, ticket barriers, toilets, and a car park with 669 spaces.

== Services ==
Services at Luton are operated by East Midlands Railway (under their EMR Connect brand) and Thameslink using Class 360 and 700 EMUs respectively.

The typical off-peak service in trains per hour is:

East Midlands Railway

- 2 tph to London St Pancras International
- 2 tph to Corby

On Sundays only, a limited number of Intercity East Midlands Railway services to and from Nottingham and Sheffield call at the station, operated by Class 222 DMUs and Class 810 BMUs.

Thameslink

- 4 tph to Bedford (stopping)
- 2 tph to Brighton via Gatwick Airport
- 2 tph to Three Bridges via Redhill
- 2 tph to Rainham via Dartford

During the peak hours, the station is served by additional services to and from Orpington, Sutton and East Grinstead. Some services on Sundays run to Horsham via Crawley.

Thameslink also operate a half-hourly night service between Bedford and Three Bridges on Sunday to Friday nights.

| Preceding station | National Rail | Following station |
|---|---|---|
| Bedford | East Midlands Railway Connect / Luton Airport Express | Luton Airport Parkway |
| Leagrave | Thameslink Thameslink | Luton Airport Parkway |
| Terminus | Thameslink Thameslink | Luton Airport Parkway |

== Connections ==
Luton Station Interchange, in front of the station building, provides connections with local and regional bus services.

- The Luton to Dunstable Busway serves Luton Station Interchange. This guided bus route, opened in 2013, provides bus rapid transit services 24 hours a day between the town and Dunstable, Houghton Regis and Luton Airport, with other busway routes to Leighton Buzzard, Milton Keynes and Aylesbury.
- There are two express services, Arriva's X1 and Stagecoach's MK1, which run to Milton Keynes Central station, connecting with Avanti West Coast services to the West Midlands, North West, North Wales and Scotland.
- Many National Express coach services serve Luton Station Interchange to destinations including Gatwick and Stansted Airports, Oxford, Birmingham, Derby and Leeds. Greenline 757 also runs regularly to London Victoria.

There was previously a shuttle bus service from the station to nearby London Luton Airport; however, the dedicated shuttle ceased following the construction of Luton Airport Parkway stationin 1999. Several bus routes serve the airport from Luton Station Interchange.
