= Earlswood Common =

Nature reserve in Surrey, England

Coordinates: 51.223°N 0.181°W

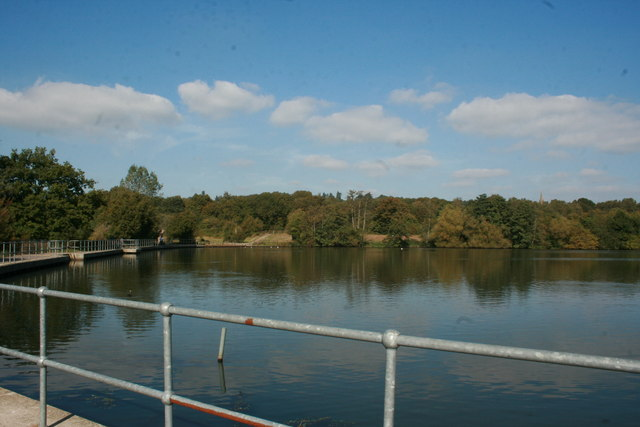
- Interactive map of Earlswood Common
- Type: Local Nature Reserve
- Location: Redhill, Surrey
- OS grid: TQ 271 487
- Area: 89.1 hectares (220 acres)
- Manager: Reigate and Banstead Borough Council

Earlswood Common is an 89.1-hectare (220-acre) Local Nature Reserve in Redhill in Surrey. It is owned and managed by Reigate and Banstead Borough Council.

Habitats on the common include woodland, semi-improved grassland, two large lakes, several ponds and wetland corridors. There are diverse insect species and mammals such as roe deer, foxes, rabbits and bats.

There are a number of access points, including ones on Pendleton Road, which goes through the common.
