= Horley railway station =

Railway station in Surrey, England

Horley
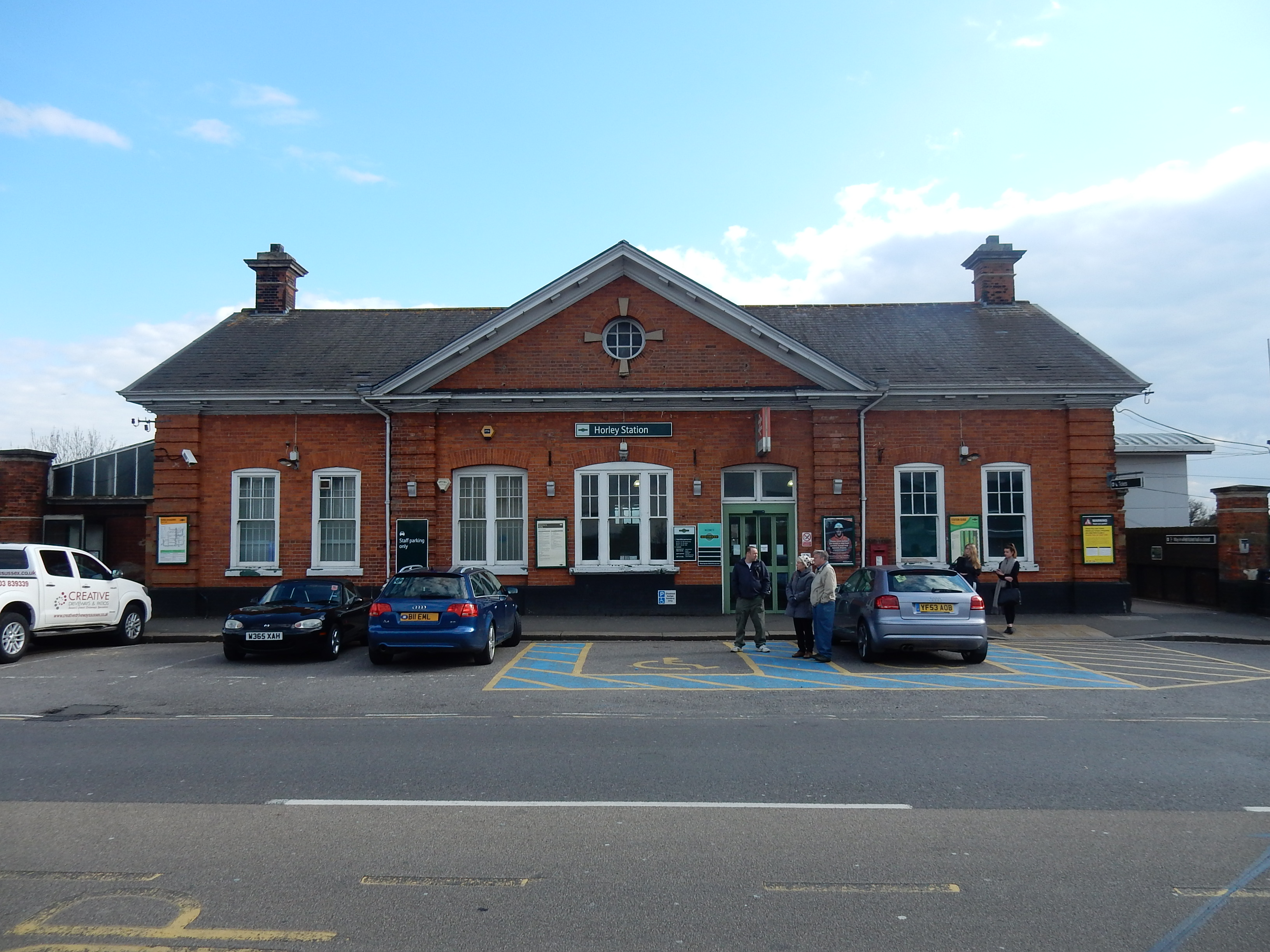
- Interactive map of Horley

General information
- Location: Horley
- Local authority: Reigate and Banstead
- Grid reference: TQ286426
- Managed by: Southern
- Station code: HOR
- DfT category: D
- Number of platforms: 4
- Accessible: Yes
- Fare zone: D

National Rail annual entry and exit
- 2020–21: ▼0.278 million
- 2021–22: ▲0.800 million
- 2022–23: ▲1.034 million
- 2023–24: ▲1.219 million
- 2024–25: ▲1.312 million

Key dates
- 1841: first station opened
- 31 December 1905: resited

Other information
- External links: Departures; Facilities
- Coordinates: 51.169°N 0.161°W

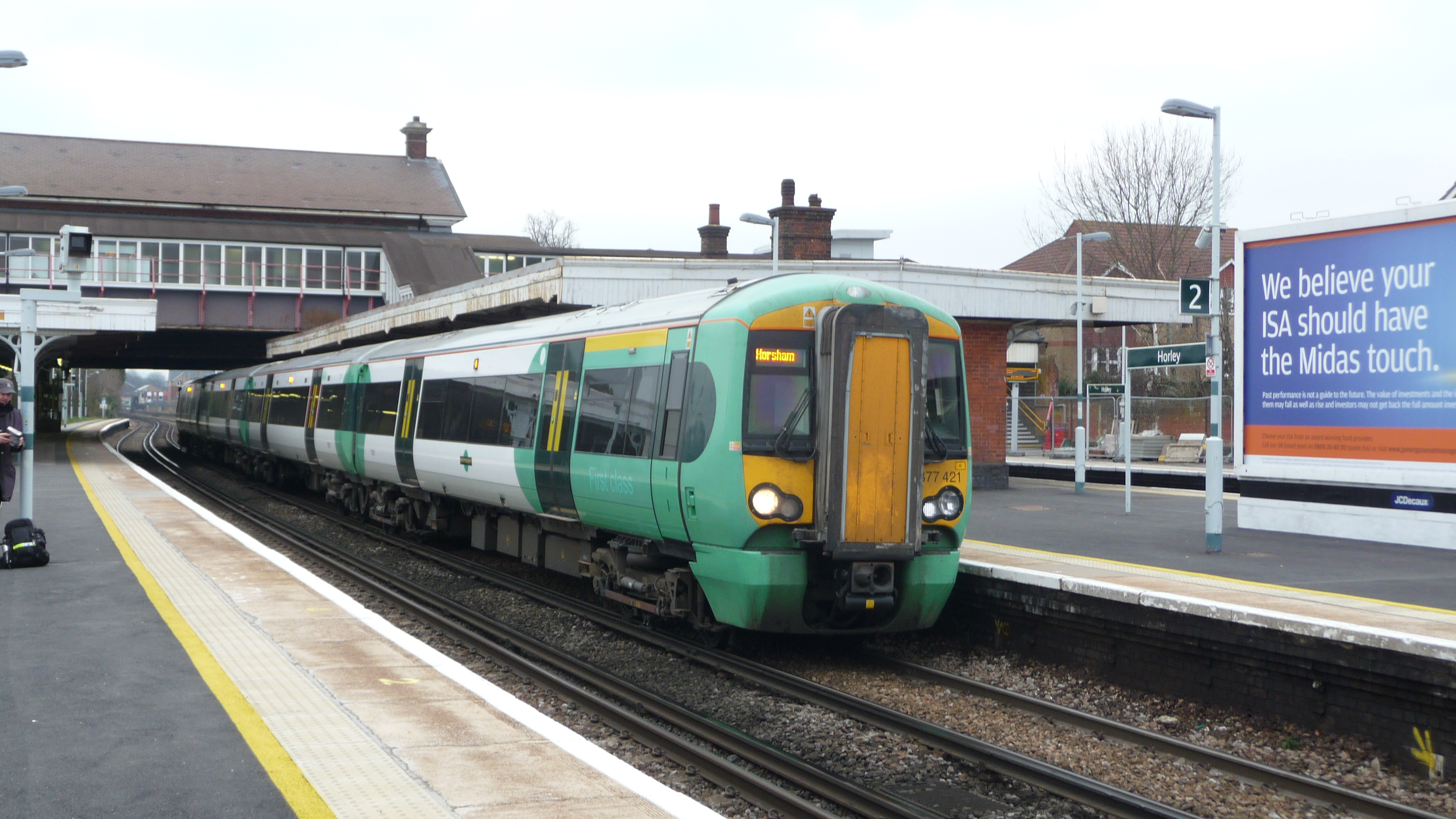
Southern 377421 at platform 2 with a service to Horsham.

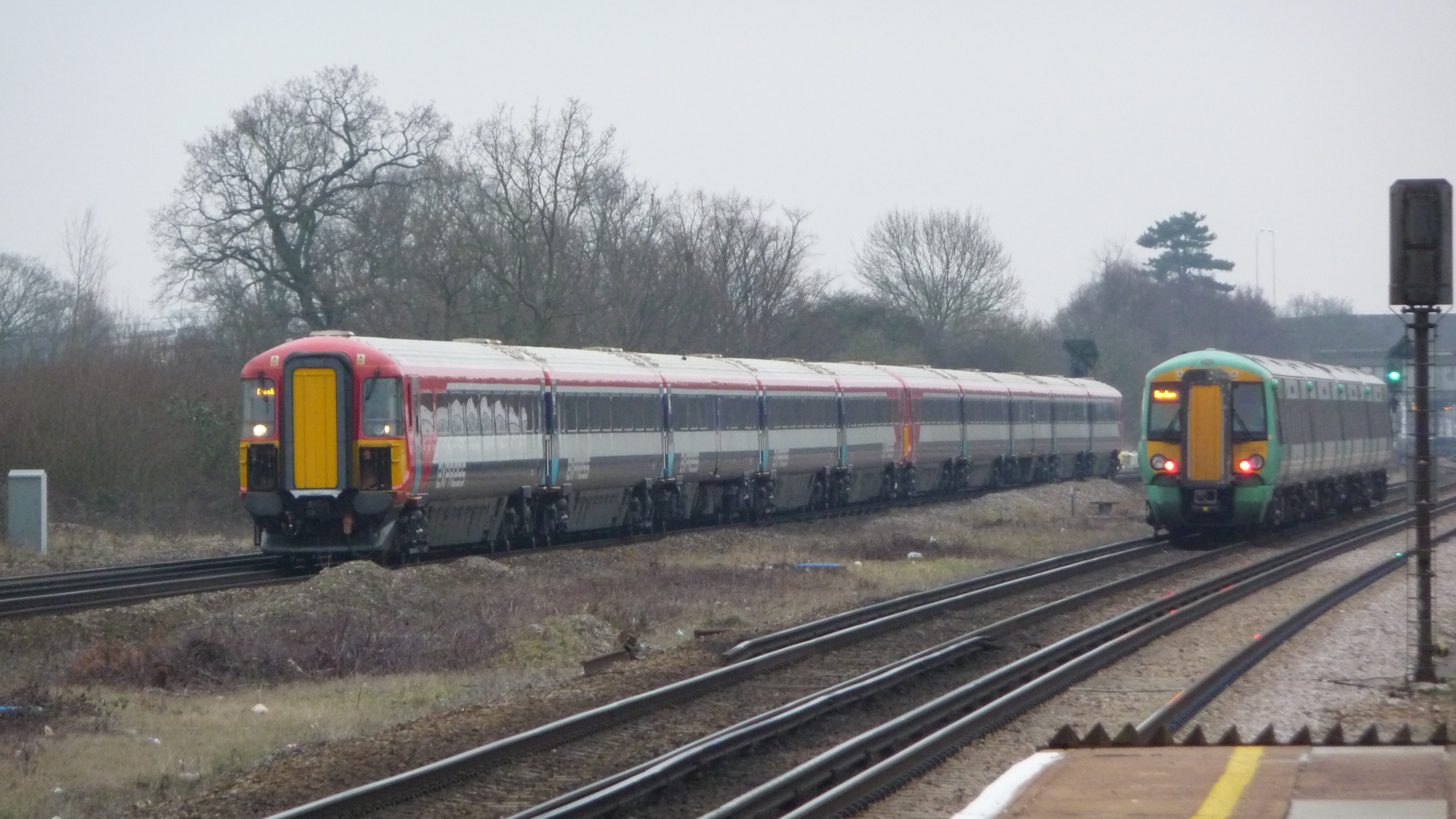
Gatwick Express & Southern service approaching and leaving Horley

Horley railway station serves the town of Horley in Surrey, England. It is on the Brighton Main Line, 25 miles 60 chains (41.4 km) down the line from London Bridge via Redhill, and train services are provided by Thameslink and Southern.

There are 4 platforms, all 270 yards (247 m) long, capable of accepting 12-car-long trains.

== History ==
The present Horley station is in fact the second in the town. The original station, constructed by the London and Brighton Railway, opened on 12 July 1841, was located 301 yards (275 m) north of the present site, where the Factory Shop is. The first station was designed by David Mocatta and was on a larger scale than other intermediate stations on the line. Horley was situated almost midway between London and Brighton, and was chosen for the erection of the London and Brighton Railway carriage sheds and repair workshops. These were later moved to Brighton railway works. The station was enlarged in 1862 by addition of a second storey to the building. A canopy and footbridge were added in 1884.

The current Horley station opened 31 December 1905, to coincide with the quadrupling of the railway line by the London Brighton and South Coast Railway. The original station then became the Station Master's house and survived until the 1960s.

In the 1870s William Stroudley considered moving the locomotive works to Horley but was persuaded to keep them in Brighton. Nevertheless, the sidings at Horley were used for storing withdrawn locomotives and those awaiting repair until the First World War.

The Thameslink Programme turned over some of the Southern services over to the expanded Thameslink network currently operated by Govia Thameslink Railway. This project saw most services that previously terminated at London Bridge continuing through the Thameslink core in Central London and northwards via the Midland Main Line and East Coast Main Line to destinations such as Bedford and Peterborough.

== Facilities ==
The station has a ticket office, a café, two waiting rooms, a unisex toilet, and two car parks.

== Services ==
Off-peak, all services at Horley are operated by Thameslink using Class 700 EMUs.

The typical off-peak service in trains per hour is:

- 2 tph to Bedford via London Bridge
- 2 tph to Peterborough
- 2 tph to Three Bridges
- 2 tph to Horsham

During the peak hours, the station is served by an additional half-hourly Southern between London Victoria and Three Bridges. In addition, faster peak hour services towards Littlehampton now stop at the station.

During the night, the station is served by an hourly Thameslink service between Three Bridges and Bedford (not calling at London Bridge). This service runs on Sunday-Friday nights with an hourly Southern service to London Victoria on Saturday nights.

Although the station is outside Greater London, Oyster Pay as you go and contactless payment cards are valid. However, the station is outside the London Fare Zone area and as a result, special fares apply.

Preceding station	National Rail	Following station
Salfords or Redhill	Thameslink Brighton Main Line	Gatwick Airport
Salfords or East Croydon	Southern: Brighton Main Line; Peak Hours Only	Gatwick Airport
