= Salfords railway station =

Railway station in Surrey, England

Salfords
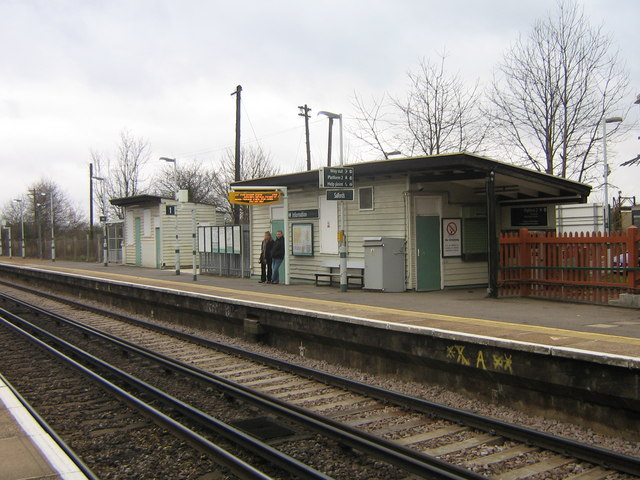
- Interactive map of Salfords

General information
- Location: Salfords
- Local authority: Reigate and Banstead
- Grid reference: TQ285462
- Managed by: Southern
- Station code: SAF
- DfT category: E
- Number of platforms: 2
- Accessible: Yes, Northbound only
- Fare zone: D

National Rail annual entry and exit
- 2020–21: ▼36,046
- 2021–22: ▲84,094
- 2022–23: ▲0.116 million
- 2023–24: ▲0.143 million
- 2024–25: ▲0.158 million

Railway companies
- Original company: London, Brighton and South Coast Railway
- Pre-grouping: London, Brighton and South Coast Railway
- Post-grouping: Southern Railway

Key dates
- 8 October 1915: Station opened as Salfords Halt unadvertised service for workmen
- 17 July 1932: Line electrified with advertised public service
- 1 January 1935: Renamed Salfords

Other information
- External links: Departures; Facilities
- Coordinates: 51.202°N 0.162°W

Salfords railway station serves the village of Salfords in Surrey, England. The station is sometimes shown as Salfords (Surrey) in timetables to differentiate it from the two stations in Salford, Greater Manchester. It is on the Brighton Main Line, 23 miles 37 chains (37.8 km) down the line from London Bridge via Redhill and is managed by Southern. Train services are provided by Thameslink and Southern.

The station has four lines running through it: two slow lines with platforms and two express lines that have no platforms. The ticket office is open weekdays from 6:30 am to 10:30 am. Journey times are around 45 minutes to London, 25 to Croydon, 7 to Redhill and Gatwick Airport, 10 to Crawley and 20 to Horsham.

== History ==
Salfords station was originally built in 1915 for workers at the Monotype Corporation, which had constructed a factory next to the railway line in 1899. From its opening on 8 October 1915 the train service was not advertised and sparse to meet the needs of Monotype Corporation staff. On 17 July 1932 the line was electrified on 750 Volts DC third rail and concurrently the station was served by a regular advertised train service. The station name, originally Salfords Halt, was simplified to Salfords on 1 January 1935.

Day Aggregates made use of the open land beside the station to store and transport their loose stones for construction in the area for some time. The sidings used still exist, including a bay platform at the station and most of the machinery used to expel and fill the wagons that transported the stone at the site.

Following a successful trial in Stoke-on-Trent, Network Rail have commissioned a live survey using drones, based in the sidings at Salfords. The survey is being used for design work for S&C replacement. The use of drones means surveys can be taken without track access or possessions.

On 14 January 2008, the station received a minor upgrade. This involved the replacing of the wooden huts with modern glass waiting areas and the installation of dynamic digital displays with information about the next train.

Southeastern used to serve the station with an hourly Maidstone West to Three Bridges (Via Redhill) service. This service was cut in the December 2008 timetable change.

Since 20 May 2018 Salfords is served by the Thameslink service between Bedford and Gatwick Airport.

== Services ==
Off-peak, all services at Salfords are operated by Thameslink using Class 700 EMUs.

The typical off-peak service in trains per hour is:

- 2 tph to Bedford via London Bridge
- 2 tph to Three Bridges

During the peak hours, the station is served by an additional half-hourly Southern service between London Victoria and Gatwick Airport.

On Sundays, the service is reduced to hourly but southbound services are extended beyond Three Bridges to and from Horsham.

Although the station is outside Greater London, Oyster Pay as you go and contactless payment cards are valid. However, the station is outside the London Fare Zone area and as a result, special fares apply.

Preceding station	National Rail	Following station
Earlswood	Thameslink Brighton Main Line	Horley
Earlswood	Southern Brighton Main Line Peak Hours Only	Horley
