= Gatwick Airport railway station =

Railway station in West Sussex, England

Gatwick Airport
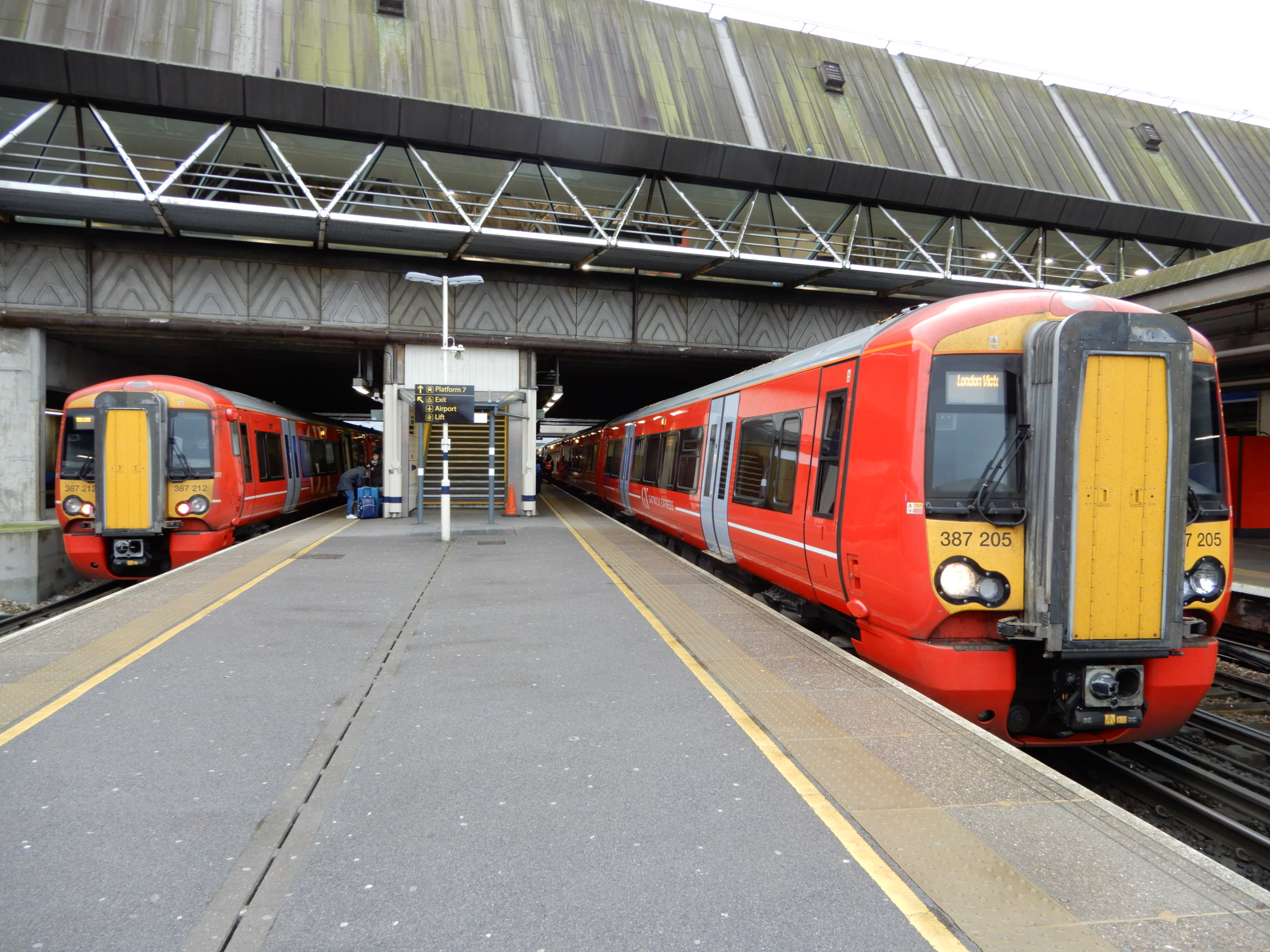
- Gatwick Express Class 387s at platforms 5 and 6
- Interactive map of Gatwick Airport

General information
- Location: Gatwick Airport
- Local authority: Borough of Crawley
- Grid reference: TQ287413
- Managed by: Gatwick Express
- Station code: GTW
- DfT category: B
- Number of platforms: 7
- Accessible: Yes

National Rail annual entry and exit
- 2020–21: ▼1.686 million
- Interchange: ▼0.319 million
- 2021–22: ▲5.919 million
- Interchange: ▲0.909 million
- 2022–23: ▲16.508 million
- Interchange: ▼0.853 million
- 2023–24: ▲19.490 million
- Interchange: ▲0.987 million
- 2024–25: ▲21.211 million
- Interchange: ▲1.157 million

Railway companies
- Original company: London, Brighton & South Coast Railway

Key dates
- 1891: Opened as Gatwick
- 1935: original Gatwick Airport station opened as Tinsley Green
- 1946: Gatwick station renamed Gatwick Racecourse
- 27 May 1958: Original station closed and Gatwick Racecourse station rebuilt and renamed Gatwick Airport

Other information
- External links: Departures; Facilities
- Coordinates: 51.1565°N 0.1609°W

Gatwick Airport railway station is on the Brighton Main Line in West Sussex, England. It serves Gatwick Airport, 26 miles 47 chains (42.8 km) down the line from London Bridge via Redhill. The platforms are about 70 metres (230 ft) to the east of the airport's South Terminal, with the ticket office above the platforms and station entrances and exits directly connected to the terminal. The station is also connected to the airport's North Terminal by the Gatwick Airport Shuttle Transit line. Gatwick Airport is the busiest station in South East England region (which excludes London) as of the 2023-24 usage statistics. There have been two stations at Gatwick, sited about 0.85 miles (1.37 km) from each other. It is the busiest station in both West Sussex and South East England, and the sixth busiest station in the UK outside of London.

The first railway station, Gatwick, opened in September 1891. It fell out of use after the opening of Tinsley Green station, which was renamed Gatwick Airport in September 1935. In 1946, it was renamed Gatwick Racecourse, to reflect its association with the neighbouring Gatwick Racecourse,. The stations had a reversal of fortunes in the 1950s as a result of a government decision to expand and develop the Beehive airport terminal into London's second airport. Gatwick Racecourse station was rebuilt to serve Gatwick Airport, and is integrated into its terminal. On 27 May 1958, the rebuilt station, which took over the name Gatwick Airport, was opened in conjunction with a regular train service; and services serving the former Tinsley Green station were discontinued.

Train services are provided by Southern, Gatwick Express, Thameslink and Great Western Railway. When viewed from the air (or in satellite imagery), the station's British Rail logo etched on the roof is visible. Between late 2010 and early 2014, new facilities were built at the station, among them platform 7; infrastructure was renewed and the concourse was refurbished. The station was one of 18 managed by Network Rail, but, in 2012, management was transferred to Southern. In May 2018, the station was named as the second-least popular major station in the UK.

== History ==
=== Gatwick/Gatwick Racecourse station ===
In September 1891, Gatwick station was constructed on the present site to serve Gatwick Racecourse, but operated only on race days. The facilities included passing loops and sidings, which enabled race trains to be held without impeding regular traffic on the Brighton Main Line. During the First World War, the sidings were extended to accommodate munitions trains heading for Newhaven.

In 1946, Gatwick station was renamed Gatwick Racecourse until 1958. The station had fallen out of regular use after the opening of nearby Tinsley Green/Gatwick Airport Station. In the early 1950s, the airport was expanded over land formerly occupied by the racecourse, and it was decided to rebuild the station. The station was integrated into the airport terminal via an upper level concourse designed by British Rail Southern Region. On 27 May 1958, the rebuilt station, Gatwick Airport, opened with a regular train service.

=== Tinsley Green/Gatwick Airport station ===
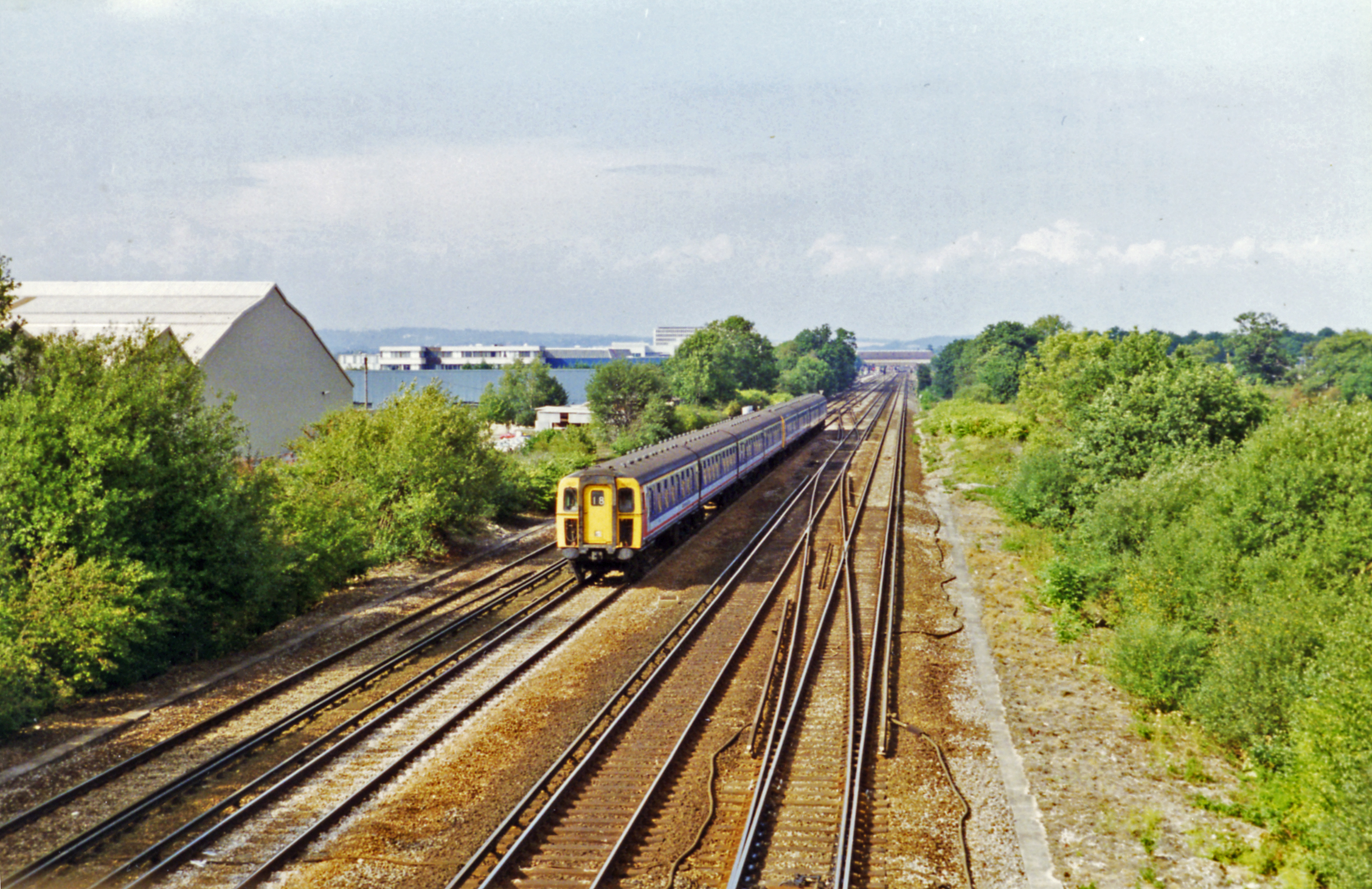
Site of the original Gatwick Airport station at Tinsley Green

On 30 September 1935, Tinsley Green station was opened 0.85 miles (1.37 km) south of the present station. Within a year it was renamed Gatwick Airport, following the completion of the Beehive airport terminal, which had a direct subway connection to the station. In 1940, the airport was requisitioned by the Royal Air Force (RAF) for military use. In 1952, the government decided to expand the airport as London's second airport. The station continued in operation until 27 May 1958 when the new Gatwick Airport station (above) opened. The old station was later demolished. The only visible remains of the old station are sections of the former up slow line platform and sections of the subway between the station and the original terminal building.

=== Present station ===
The 1958 facilities included a parcels office beneath the main concourse, lifts and a corridor on the south side of the overbridge, separated from the passenger corridor by a glazed partition. To accommodate trains of up to 12-carriage lengths, the three old Racecourse island platforms were raised by 1 ft (0.30 m) and extended to the north by about 100 ft (30 m), except for the very long westernmost platform, which was reduced from the south. The ticket office on the main concourse of the station was able to handle 670 separate issues of Edmondson tickets from its Bellmatic equipment. The signalbox was retained on the centre platform. In the 1980s, the station was refurbished. The station had six platforms immediately beneath the airport's South Terminal.

The ticket office is staffed for ticket sales and enquiries, supplemented by ticket machines capable of handling online bookings usually available on a round-the-clock basis. Automated teller machines, payphones and e-mail access points are installed on the main concourse. There are coin-operated trolleys for luggage and a left luggage facility. On-site food and drink outlets are present. Toilets are available and baby changing facilities and additional toilets can be found in the adjacent South Terminal. There is no car parking facility. Transport for London's (TfL) Oyster cards and contactless cards are accepted for travel at the station.

== Redevelopment ==
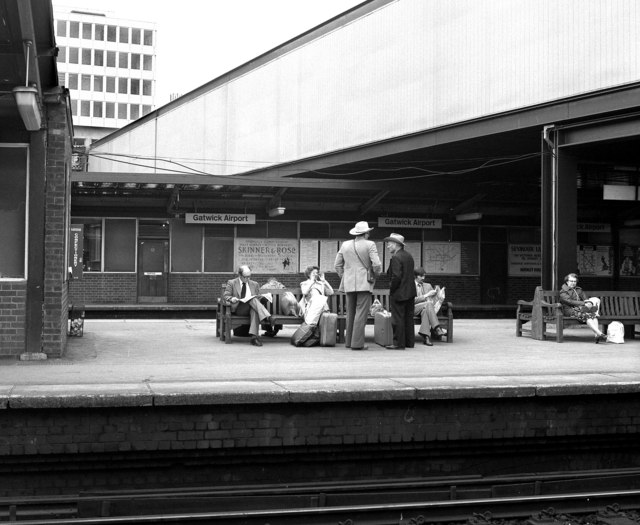
The station in 1979.

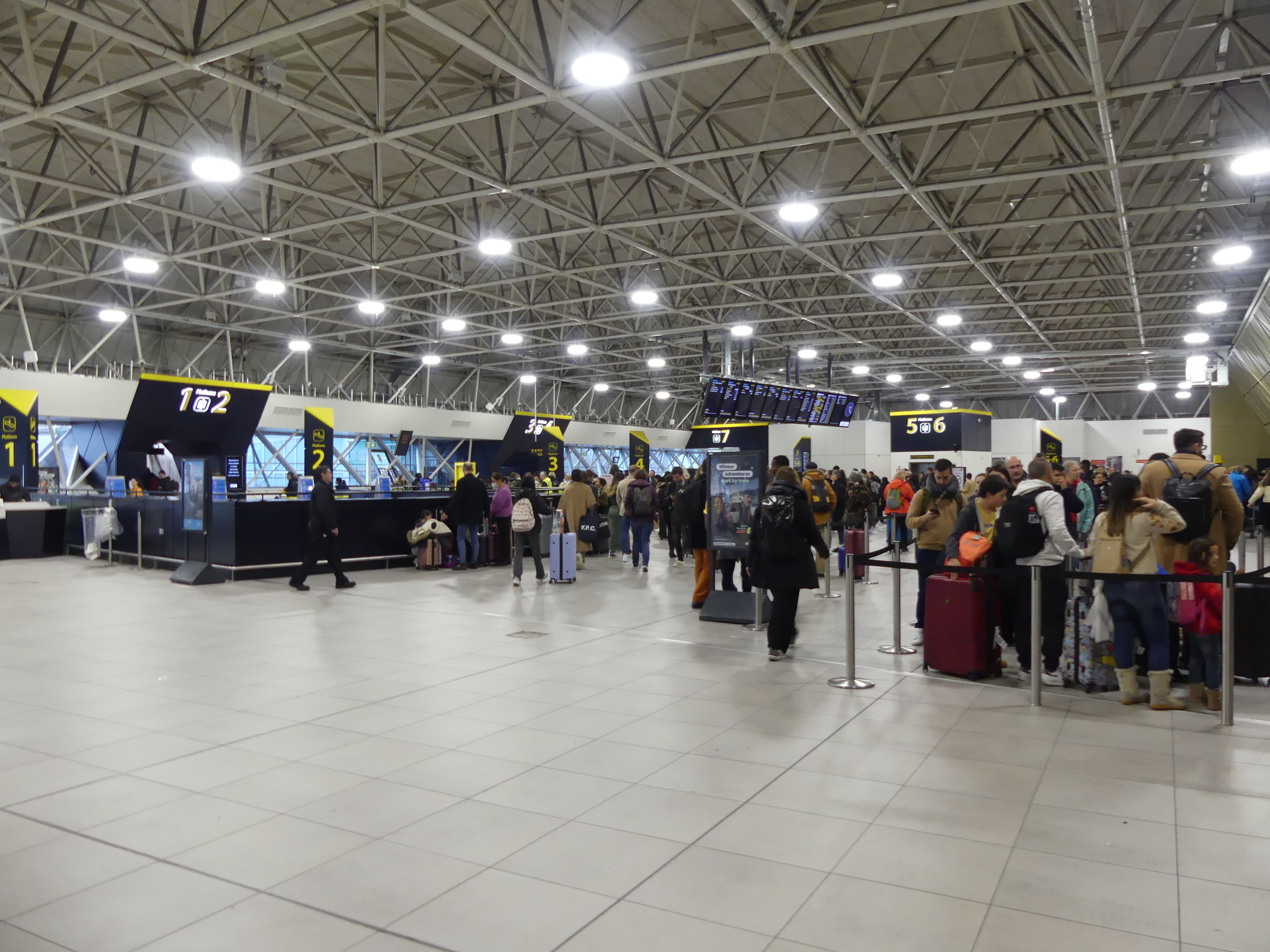
The railway station's main hall after its refurbishment

On 13 October 2010, a £53 million redevelopment programme was announced to provide another platform capable of accommodating 12-car trains, refurbishment of the concourse, and track and signal upgrades. Escalators and lifts were provided for platforms 5 and 6, replacing a staircase to achieve improved circulation. The redevelopment provided improved capacity and flexibility on the Brighton Main Line. The project was jointly financed by Network Rail, who contributed £44.9 million, and Gatwick Airport who provided £7.9 million. Construction was structured so as not to negatively affect the 2012 Summer Paralympics, which was hosted in London.

By 3 February 2014, completion was marked by a ceremony officiated by Minister of State for Transport Baroness Kramer, who formally opened the new platform. Constructed by VolkerFitzpatrick, platform 7 is served by a 975-metre (3,199 ft) loop from the down fast line and used by services which formerly used at platform 5. VolkerFitzpatrick were responsible for track and signalling modifications. This has allowed platforms 5 and 6 to be dedicated to Gatwick Express services, thereby eliminating previous conflicts with slower services when they crossed to platforms 1 and 2. The project was finished on schedule and budget, despite extreme weather conditions during the winter of 2013/2014.

In 2014, Baroness Kramer announced that the government had committed £50 million towards further improvements. A scheme for further improvements, estimated to cost around £120 million, was announced by Network Rail. In April 2018, Network Rail submitted a planning application for modernising the station; doubling the size of the concourse, widening two platforms, and improving connections to the airport terminal. It was done in partnership with Gatwick Airport authorities, the Coast to Capital local enterprise partnership and the Department for Transport. The expansion is an element of a five-year programme, costed at £1.11 billion, announced by Gatwick Airport in early 2018.

Construction on the new concourse began in November 2020. The refurbished station opened on 21 November 2023.

== Services ==
As of February 2024, train services at Gatwick Airport are operated by Southern, Gatwick Express, Thameslink and Great Western Railway and split between seven platforms.

=== Southern ===
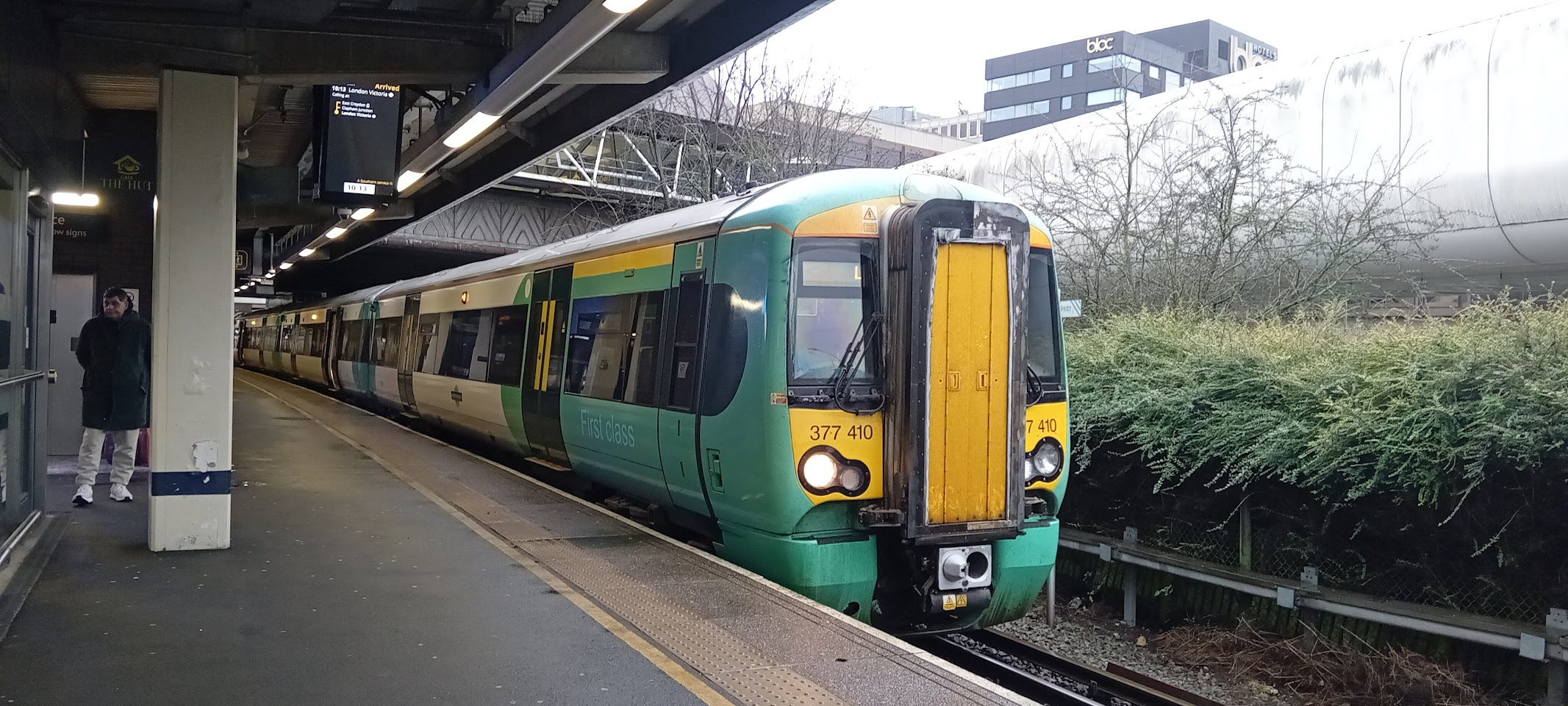
A Southern Class 377 at Gatwick Airport

The typical off-peak service in trains per hour (tph) is:

- 6 tph to London Victoria
- 2 tph to Eastbourne of which 1 continues to Ore
- 2 tph to Littlehampton via Worthing
- 2 tph to Bognor Regis and Portsmouth Harbour, dividing at Horsham

On Sundays, a London Victoria to Brighton service runs half hourly. However, services between London Victoria and Eastbourne do not run. In addition, services between London Victoria and Littlehampton reduce to hourly, and the services to Bognor Regis and Portsmouth Harbour also reduce to hourly and divide at Barnham, instead of Horsham.

=== Gatwick Express ===
The typical off-peak service in trains per hour is:

- 2 tph to London Victoria (non-stop)
- 2 tph to Brighton (calling at Haywards Heath only)

On Sundays, the services to Brighton do not run, with Gatwick Express trains operating as a shuttle between Gatwick Airport and London Victoria only.

=== Thameslink ===
The typical off-peak service in trains per hour is:

- 4 tph to Bedford via London Bridge
- 2 tph to Cambridge
- 2 tph to Peterborough via Redhill
- 4 tph to Brighton (semi-fast)
- 2 tph to Horsham (stopping)
- 2 tph to Three Bridges

On Sundays, the services between Horsham and Peterborough do not run, and instead, 1tph usually terminating at Three Bridges is extended to Horsham

There are also services that terminate here from Bedford in the evening peak hours

=== Great Western Railway ===
The typical off-peak service in trains per hour is:

- 2 tph to Reading via Guildford

| Preceding station | National Rail | Following station |
|---|---|---|
| Horley | Thameslink Arun Valley line | Three Bridges |
| East Croydon | Thameslink Brighton Main Line | Three Bridges |
| East Croydon | Southern Arun Valley line | Three Bridges |
| East Croydon | Southern Brighton Main Line | Haywards Heath |
| East Croydon | Southern East Coastway line | Haywards Heath |
| East Croydon | Southern West Coastway line | Haywards Heath |
| London Victoria | Gatwick Express Gatwick Express | Haywards Heath |
| Redhill | Great Western Railway North Downs Line | Terminus |
