= Brockley Jack Theatre =

Pub theatre in Lewisham, London, England

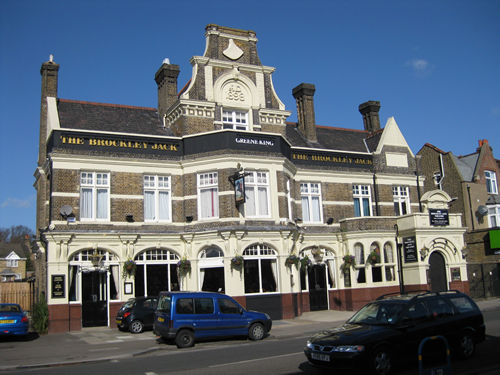
- The Brockley Jack pub. Theatre entrance is on the right.
- Interactive map of Brockley Jack Theatre
- Address: 410 Brockley Road; London, SE4 2DH; United Kingdom
- Coordinates: 51.4535°N 0.0384°W
- Capacity: 50
- Type: Fringe theatre
- Public transit: Crofton Park

Construction
- Opened: 1992

Website
- http://www.brockleyjack.co.uk

The Brockley Jack Theatre (also known as the Jack Studio Theatre) is an Off-West End theatre in the Crofton Park area of Lewisham, south London. It shares a building with the Brockley Jack pub.

The theatre was founded by David Kincaid, Michael Bottle and Peter Rocca; Kincaid and Bottle took the leads roles in its first production, of the Chekhov pieces On the Harmful Effects of Tobacco and Swansong. It opened in 1992 and is a registered charity.

The Brockley Jack Theatre's programming is a mix of established works and new writing, produced by in-house company Southside Arts and by visiting theatre companies, plus comedy and music nights and regular work-in-progress "scratch" shows. It runs workshops to support new playwrights, hosts the Brockley Jack Film Club and produces an annual festival of new plays, Write Now, supported by Lewisham Council.

The theatre's artistic director is Kate Bannister. Mike Burnside was the initial artistic director and Rhys Thomas held the post from 1996 to 1999. The Brockley Jack Theatre's associate companies are OutFox and Bruce Farce; previous associate companies include The Faction Theatre Company.

== Awards ==
- Mick Martin's play The Life and Times of Young Bob Scallion, which premiered at the Brockley Jack Theatre, won the TAPS/BAFTA Best New Play Award 1998.
- Kate Bannister and theatre manager Karl Swinyard won the Best Venue Directors category at the Fringe Report Awards 2011.
- 2011 Offie for 'Best Foodie Experience' (South East London).
- 2013 Offie for 'Most Welcoming Theatre' (South East London).
- 2014 Offie for 'Most Welcoming Theatre' (South East London).
