= Mary Stuart (Schiller play) =

1800 verse play by Friedrich Schiller

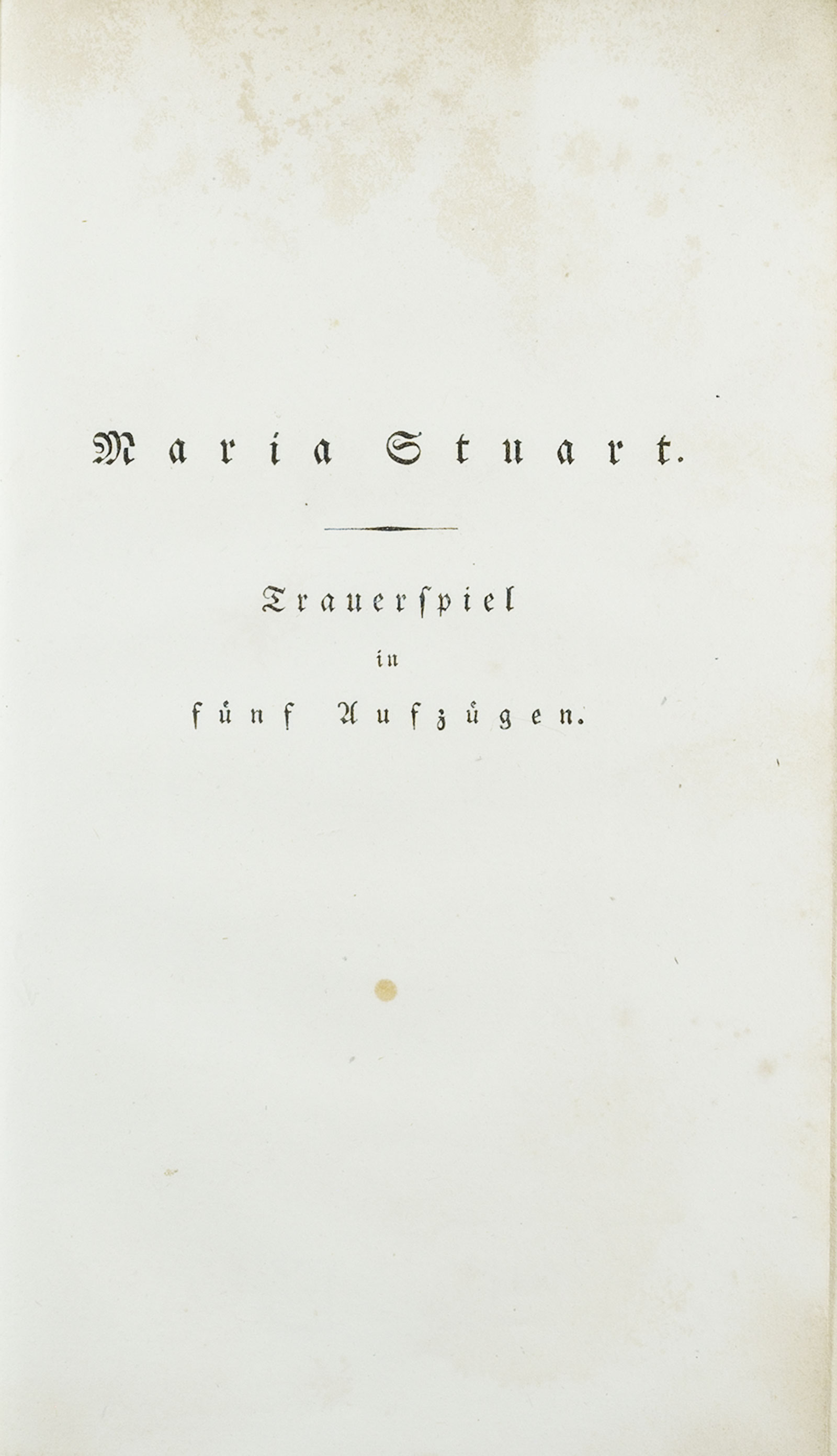
First edition (1801)

Mary Stuart (German: Maria Stuart, German pronunciation: [maˈʁiːa ˈstjuːɐt]) is a verse play by Friedrich Schiller that depicts the last days of Mary, Queen of Scots. The play consists of five acts, each divided into several scenes. The play had its première in Weimar, Germany on 14 June 1800. The play formed the basis for Donizetti's opera Maria Stuarda (1835).

== Synopsis ==
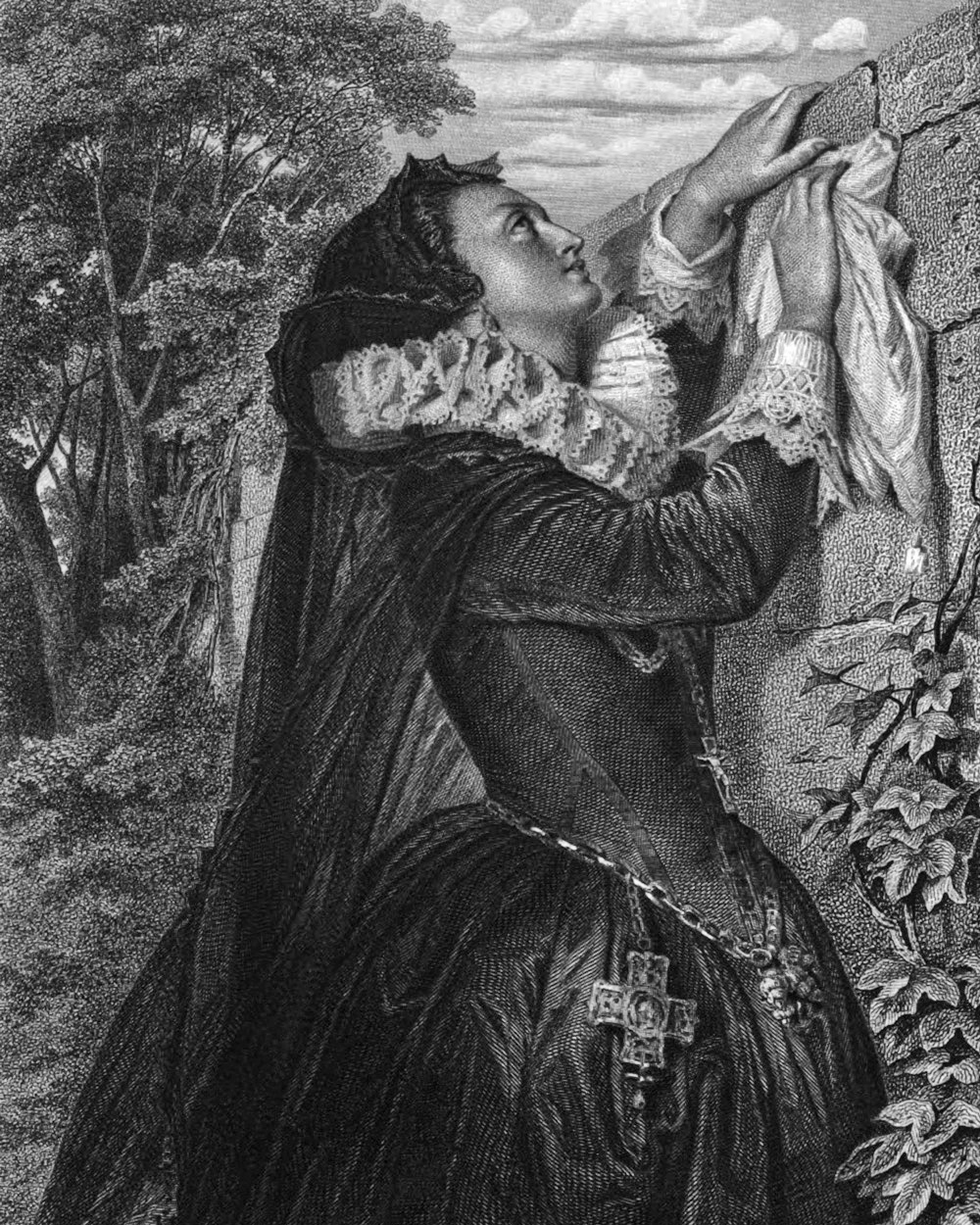
Mary Stuart (drawing by Arthur von Ramberg (1859))

Mary Stuart is imprisoned in England—nominally for the murder of her husband Darnley, but actually due to her claim to the throne of England held by Queen Elizabeth I. While Mary's cousin, Elizabeth, hesitates over signing Mary's death sentence, Mary hopes for a reprieve.

After Mary finds out that Mortimer (created by Schiller), the nephew of her custodian, is on her side, she entrusts her life to him. Mortimer is supposed to give Robert Dudley, the Earl of Leicester, a letter from Mary, in which she pleads for help. This is a delicate situation, for Leicester seems to support Queen Elizabeth.

After numerous requests, Mary finally gains the opportunity to meet Queen Elizabeth (something that, in reality, never happened). This meeting ends in an acrimonious argument, caused by Mary's unwillingness to submit entirely to Elizabeth's wish. The argument leads to the inevitable suspicion that the cause of reprieve will not succeed.

To complicate matters further, Mortimer plans to free Mary from the prison by force, a dramatized version of the unsuccessful Babington Plot, but when his attempt is found out, he commits suicide, while the Earl of Leicester uses this convenient suicide to rescue himself from suspicion.

Queen Elizabeth eventually persuades herself to sign Mary's death warrant. Elizabeth insists that her only reason for signing is the pressure from her own people to do so.

The signed warrant is handed to Queen Elizabeth's undersecretary William Davison without any clear instructions on what to do with it. In the process, Elizabeth transfers the burden of responsibility to him, fully aware that he in turn will hand over the warrant to Lord Burleigh, and thus confirm Mary's death sentence.

Burleigh demands the signed document from Davison, who—despite his uncertainty—eventually hands it to him. As a result, Burleigh has Mary executed.

The play ends with Elizabeth blaming both Burleigh and Davison for Mary's death (banishing the former from court and having the latter imprisoned in the Tower), Lord Shrewsbury (who pleaded for mercy for Mary throughout the play) resigning his honors and Leicester leaving England for France. Elizabeth is left completely alone as the curtain falls.

== Departures from history ==
Among Schiller's inventions are one of the play's principal characters, Mortimer, and one of its pivotal scenes, the meeting between Mary and Elizabeth. In addition, Robert Dudley, Earl of Leicester, was overseas at the time of Mary's trial; while in the Netherlands and after his return to England, he advocated vigorously - and, as far as the historical record can tell, sincerely - for Mary's execution.

== Recent productions and adaptations ==
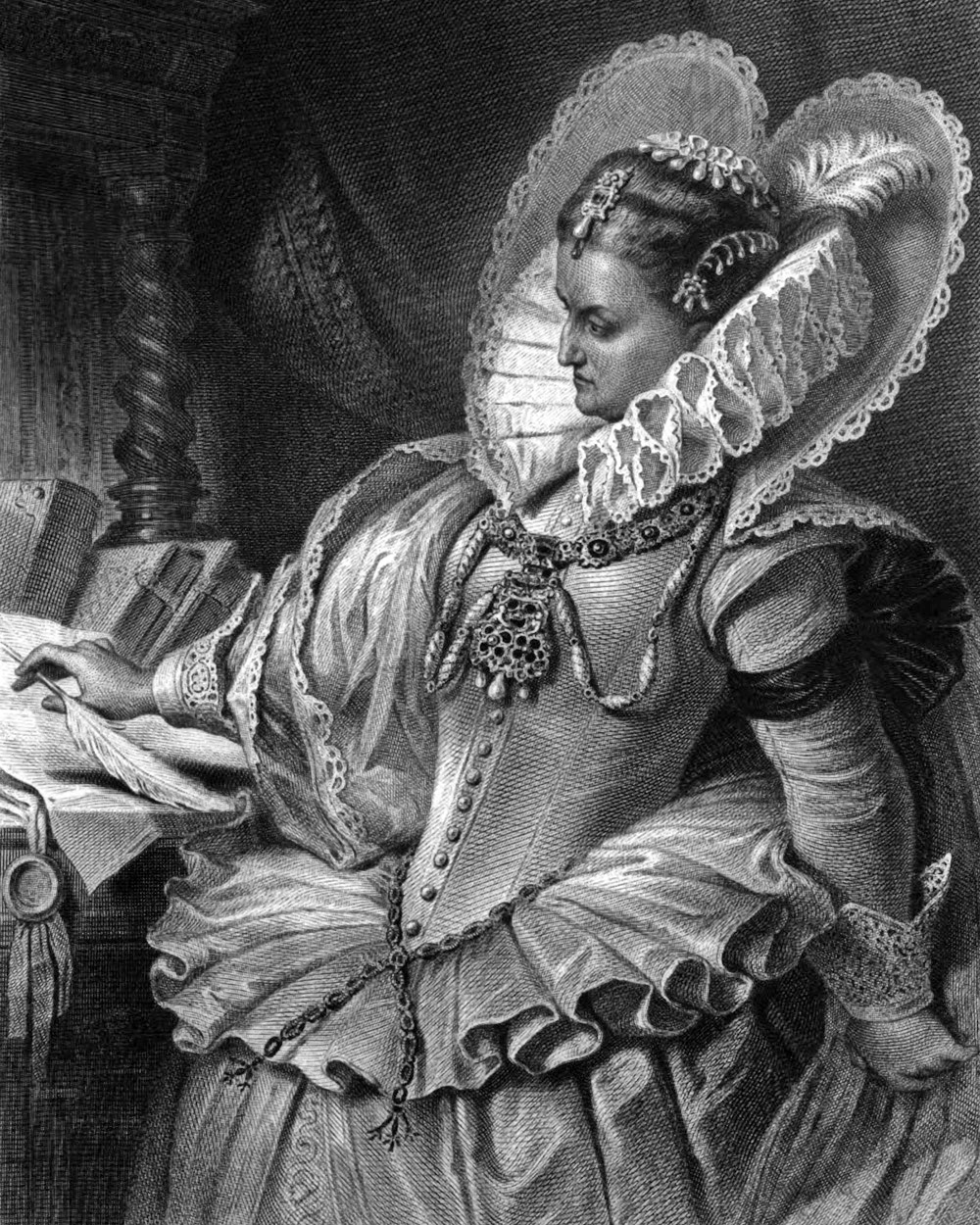
Queen Elizabeth in the Mary Stuart play (drawing by Arthur von Ramberg (1859))

The first UK production of Mary Stuart to be staged for the Schiller bicentenary in 2005, was at Derby Playhouse where it ran from 3 to 26 May. Using Robert David MacDonald's translation, the play was directed by Uzma Hameed and starred Hilary Tones as Elizabeth I and Chloe Angharad as Mary Stuart. The production drew parallels between the danger to Elizabethan England from Catholic Rome and the modern threat of Islamist terrorism, and was described by The Stage as "seriously good drama, powerfully staged." Mary Stuart, which holds a place in the opera repertory in Donizetti's version (as Maria Stuarda), can still hold the stage in its original form as demonstrated in its successful production, given in a 2005 run at the Donmar Warehouse. Using Peter Oswald's new translation, it was directed by Phyllida Lloyd and starred Janet McTeer as Mary, Queen of Scots and Harriet Walter as Elizabeth of England. The production transferred to the Apollo Theatre in London's West End, where it also played a sold-out engagement from late 2005 into January 2006. The production opened on Broadway on 30 March 2009 (previews), officially 19 April, for a limited engagement through mid-August. It earned seven Tony Award nominations including Best Revival of a Play.

The L.A. Theatre Works of Los Angeles mounted a production of the Peter Oswald translation in 2007 directed by Rosalind Ayres which was recorded on CD (ISBN 978-1580813754) and featured Alex Kingston as Mary, Jill Gascoine as Elizabeth, Martin Jarvis as Burleigh, Simon Templeman as Leicester, Ken Danziger as Paulet, W. Morgan Sheppard as Talbot, Christopher Neame as Davison, Shellagh Cullen as Hanna Kennedy and Seamus Dever as Mortimer.

The Faction Theatre Company, as part of a repertory season, staged an adaptation of Mary Stuart at the New Diorama Theatre in London in early 2012. The production was the third Schiller play translated and adapted by Daniel Millar and Mark Leipacher and staged by the company.

On 23 September 2012, BBC Radio 3 broadcast a production translated by David Harrower, adapted for radio by Robin Brooks and produced/directed by Gaynor Macfarlane. The cast included Meg Fraser as Mary, Alexandra Mathie as Elizabeth, Matthew Pidgeon as Mortimer, Robin Laing as Leicester, Richard Greenwood as Burleigh and Paul Young as Shrewsbury.

Mortimer's on-stage suicide has had its dangers. On 6 December 2008, German actor Daniel Hoevels slit his neck while playing Mortimer in Mary Stuart. His character's suicide scene was to feature a dull knife, which became damaged and was replaced by a sharp one. The Thalia Theater company had requested that the sharp one be dulled too, though this was "carelessly" disregarded.

The Stratford Shakespeare Festival ran a production in 2013 at the Tom Patterson Theatre with the Peter Oswald translation and directed by Antoni Cimolino. The cast includes Lucy Peacock as Mary, Seana McKenna as Elizabeth, Brian Dennehy as the Earl of Shrewsbury and Geraint Wyn Davies as the Earl of Leicester. The production began its run on 31 May 2013 and was consistently sold out to the point where the production's run was extended for a fourth time, until 19 October.

In 2016 Ben Naylor directed his own adaptation of the play at the Royal Central School of Speech and Drama.

An adaptation by Robert Icke opened at London's Almeida Theatre in 2016, starring Juliet Stevenson and Lia Williams. At the beginning of each performance the two leading actors were randomly assigned the roles of Elizabeth I and Mary Stuart by the spinning of a coin. The play transferred to the West End's Duke of York's Theatre in 2018 before embarking on a UK tour.

The Sydney Theatre Company staged a new adaptation by Kate Mulvany, directed by Lee Lewis, in February 2019 at the Ros Packer Theatre. It starred Caroline Brazier as Mary and Helen Thomson as Elizabeth.

== Important characters ==
- Mary Stuart (Mary, Queen of Scots)
- Queen Elizabeth I
- Earl of Leicester (Robert Dudley)
- Earl of Shrewsbury (George Talbot)
- Lord Burleigh
- Wilhelm Davison (undersecretary)
- Amias Paulet (Mary's warder)
- Mortimer, Amias' nephew (not a historical figure)
- Hanna Kennedy, based on Mary's lady in waiting Jane Kennedy.
