= Crofton Park =

Suburb of London, England

Coordinates: 51.4523°N 0.0333°W

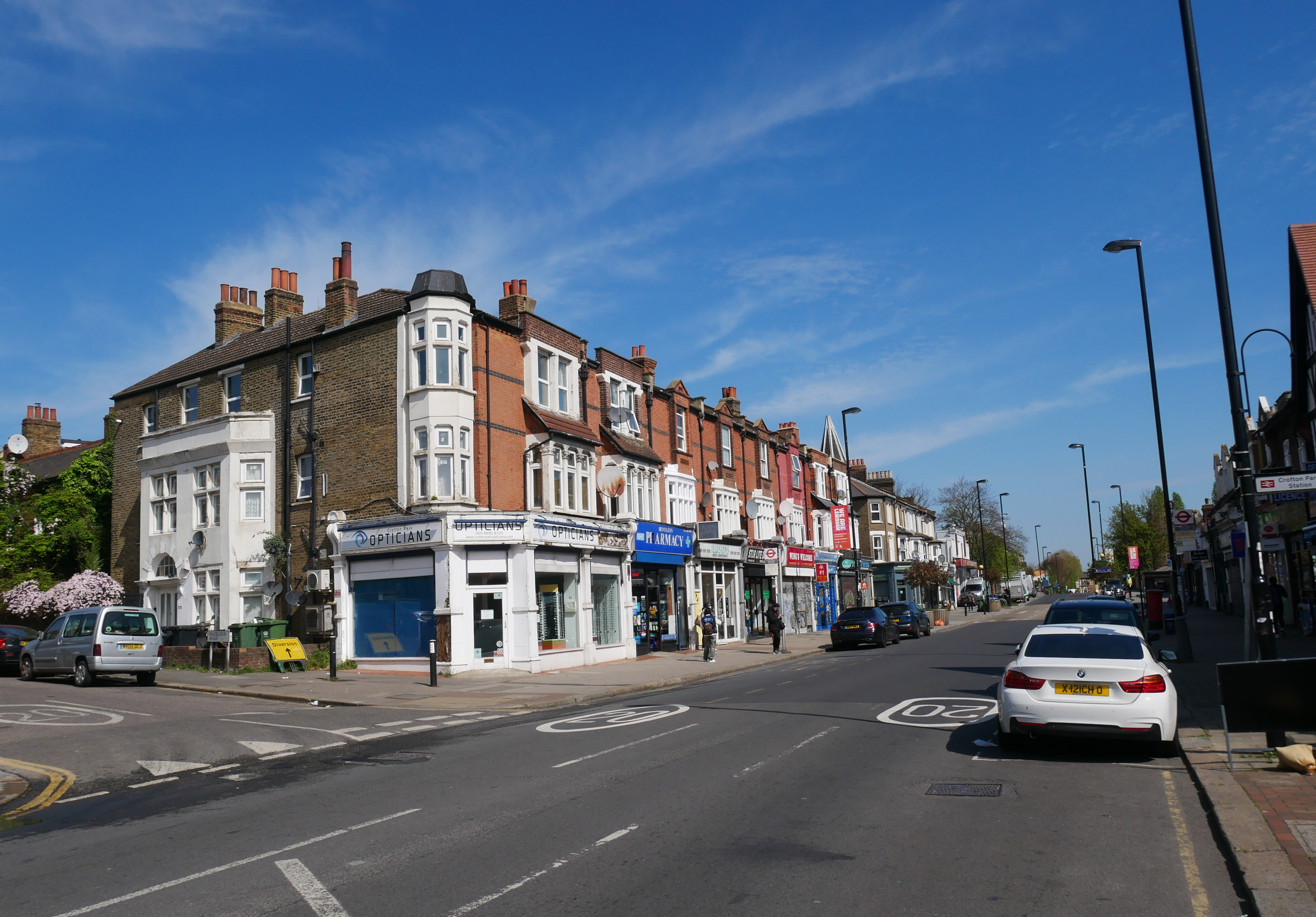
- Brockley Road runs through Crofton Park

- Location within Greater London
- Population: 14,937 (2011 Census. Ward)
- OS grid reference: TQ367744
- London borough: Lewisham
- Ceremonial county: Greater London
- Region: London
- Country: England
- Sovereign state: United Kingdom
- Post town: LONDON
- Postcode district: SE4, SE23
- Dialling code: 020
- Police: Metropolitan
- Fire: London
- Ambulance: London
- UK Parliament: Lewisham West and East Dulwich
- London Assembly: Greenwich and Lewisham

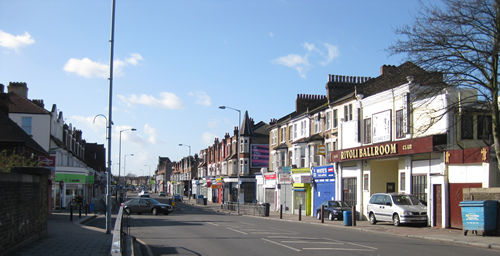
View of the high street in Crofton Park, London SE4, 2009

Crofton Park is a predominantly residential suburb in the London Borough of Lewisham.

It is the original site of the former agricultural hamlet of Brockley. It is located 5.3 miles (8.5 km) south east of Charing Cross, and is south of Brockley and north of Honor Oak. Major points of interest include the Rivoli Ballroom, the Brockley Jack Theatre and the Arts and Crafts Gothic church of St Hilda.

Crofton Park Ward is bordered by Brockley and Ladywell Cemeteries to the north, and Garthorne Road Nature Reserve in the west with the London to Brighton railway running along the western boundary of the ward and a section of Ladywell Fields to the south east. The area also offers easy access to South East London Green Chain of walks. Nearby, between Honor Oak and Catford, is Blythe Hill Fields, one of a number of hills in south east London and which provide good views of Canary Wharf and the City of London.

== History ==
Before the area was built in the late 19th century, the principal buildings were Brockley Farm, Brockley Hall, and the Brockley Jack public house. The area expanded rapidly in the 1890s with the opening of a new railway line (informally known as the Catford Loop) and railway station which opened in 1892. It was the naming of the station as Crofton Park which gave the area its modern and invented name. Despite this being the historic heart of Brockley, that name had already been used for two earlier railway stations further north – Brockley Station and Brockley Lane Station.

The rapid pace of expansion of the area continued pre-First World War, with the building of more shops and facilities to support the growing population. The London Encyclopaedia describes this development as: "a mixture of terrace houses for 'clerkly classes' and local authority flats and houses." A handsome Edwardian public library was built next to the railway station in 1905 and, eight years later, a local cinema – the Crofton Park Picture Palace – first opened its doors. This later became the Rivoli Ballroom.

=== Brockley Hall ===
Brockley Hall, a large private residence, stood on land to the west of the road which now bears its name. The property had a somewhat obscure history. There was a house on the site before 1745 and probably long before that date. It was the most associated with its final owners, the Noakes family who lived there. The Noakes were brewers and their ales were sold in many local pubs, including The Brockley Jack which they owned and was just across the road from Brockley Hall. The Hall's lodge stood in Brockley Grove on the approximate site of what are now the front gardens of nos. 24–28.

The 1901 census returns show Bertram Noakes as head of the household living in Brockley Hall with his five spinster sisters (Pauline, Elizabeth, Kate, Ada and Maude) and four servants. Lewisham Arhive's photograph of the Hall suggests at one time it was called Noakes Farm.

Maude Noakes was the last survivor. An eccentric, she was well known for her large collection of pets. The old lady would bury her pets in the grounds of Brockley Hall and give each one a marked gravestone – even her pigs and cows.

Following Maude's death in April 1931 the property was quickly sold and demolished. Brockley Hall Road, Bearsted Rise, Horsmonden Road, Sevenoaks Road and the 1930s houses in Brockley Grove were built on the site of the Hall and its grounds by the building company Wates.

=== The Second World War ===
In common with many areas of London, Crofton Park was damaged during the Second World War, particularly by V1 flying bombs and V2 rockets, with the area north of Crofton Park Station on Brockley Road suffering many strikes. A V1 'doodlebug' hit on the evening of 18 June 1944 destroyed Brockley Road School and killed five members of the Crofton Park Home Guard. The men are commemorated by a plaque in St Hilda's Church.

== Governance ==
For elections to Lewisham London Borough Council Crofton Park is part of the Crofton Park electoral ward.

== Notable buildings ==
=== Brockley Jack ===
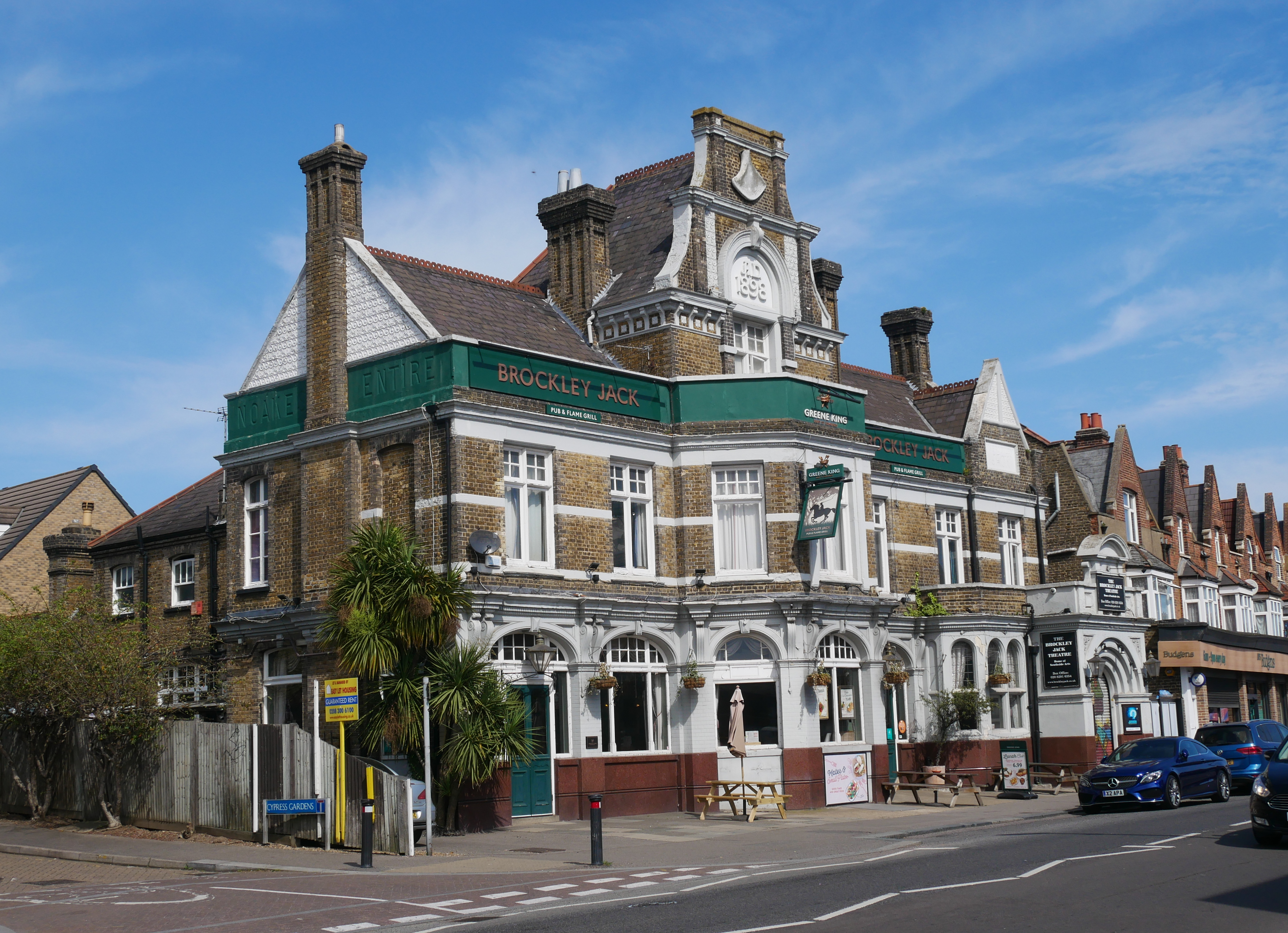
Southeast view of the Brockley Jack pub

The Brockley Jack was formerly a picturesque timber-framed building and one of the earliest landmarks in Crofton Park. It was described by The London Encyclopaedia as: "a curious, rambling hostelry, reputedly the haunt of highwaymen".

For much of the 18th century it was known as 'The Crooked Billet', for much of the 19th century 'The Castle'.

The old Brockley Jack was one of the most photographed pubs in South East London. It was a long, low building with a bay window looking onto the front garden. It had been extended and altered many times during its long history. In the garden were rows of seats and tables beneath old trees, and a large but almost branchless tree stump carrying the pub's sign board. The sign was written on a whale's shoulder blade.

A contemporary account, recorded at about the time of the building's demolition states: "A penthouse on one side sheltered some of the seats and on the other side was a staircase leading to the upper floor of an annex built at right angles to the main building... Within, the rooms are dark with low-pitched ceilings and redolent of beer and tobacco, of which is added the flavour of antiquity from ancient walls and beams."

The association with highwaymen is also cited in the account which continues: "There was a particular staircase so constructed that it could be removed at night, and thus cut off access to the upper storey, in case of criminals being secreted there." The film star comedian Will Hay recalled the old Brockley Jack in his unfinished autobiography, I Enjoyed Every Minute:

"Almost at the corner of the street was romance in the shape of a very old inn, several hundred years old, The Brockley Jack, a reputed haunt and 'pull up' for highwaymen including the famous Dick Turpin. I remember the place quite well – small rooms with the ceiling so low that even a man of ordinary height couldn't stand upright. Alas, the romance didn't long survive on arrival within the district for the place was condemned and pulled down to make way for a modern building."

A 2005 Radio 4 edition of Making History explored the history of Brockley Jack and found that the pub dated to at least 1810 and was close to areas notorious for robberies of travellers. However, the programme concluded that local legends about a highwayman called Brockley Jack may have been later embroidery to drum up business.

Brockley Jack, now a Greene King tied pub, was rebuilt as a more substantial structure of brick and stone in 1898. Its foundation stone was laid by Wickham Noakes. A representation of a whale's shoulderblade hangs on a high gable outside the front of the Jack. The real whale's shoulderblade (on which was once the pub's sign) is exhibited above the fireplace to the right of the bar.

=== St Hilda's Church ===
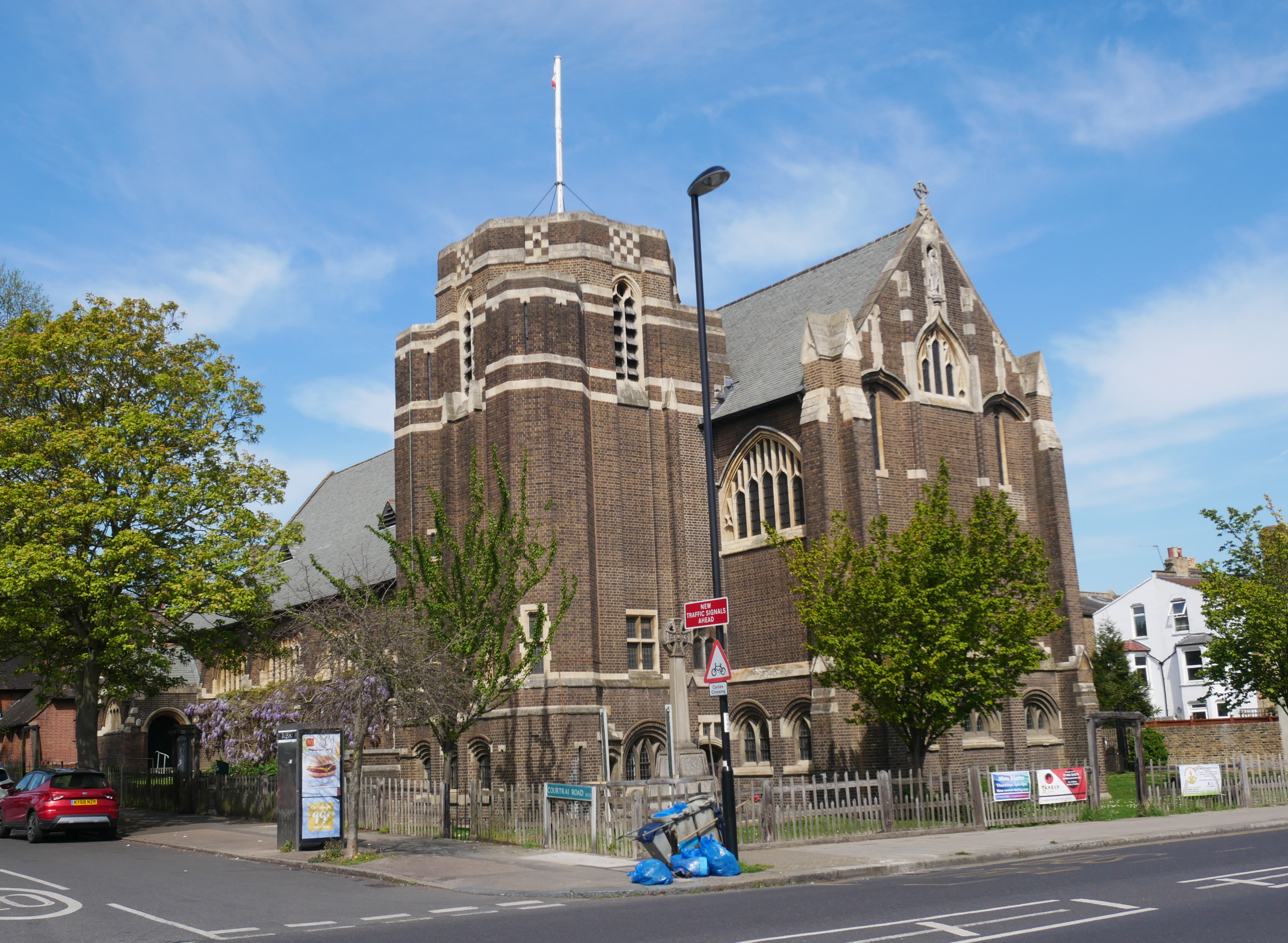
The Church of Saint Hilda in Crofton Park

Situated in Stondon Park, St Hilda's Church dates from 1907 and was designed by F H Greenaway and J E Newberry. The Grade II listed building is constructed of Crowborough brick with Chilmark stone dressings and is a fine example of Arts and Crafts ideas superimposed onto Gothic church design. Its English Heritage listing describes it as one of the best Edwardian churches in London. It has been described by the architectural historian Gavin Stamp as one of two "remarkable and inventive buildings" which distinguish this part of South London, the other building being the Horniman Museum at Forest Hill.

The church hall adjacent to the current church was its forerunner and originally served as a mission hall. Designed by J E Newberry, it is also Grade II listed.

The war memorial in front of the church is in the form of a granite Celtic cross and is inscribed with 141 names of the fallen. It was unveiled on 29 May 1920 by General Sir Ian Hamilton and dedicated by the Bishop Suffragan of Woolwich. A woman is listed among the names – Rosabelle Stanley, a nursing sister.

=== Library ===
Crofton Park Library, originally known as Brockley Branch Library, was opened in October 1905 to serve the expanding local population. It is a Carnegie library. Its architect was Alfred L Guy, ARIBA, and it was constructed by F J Gortham of Greenwich. The library is of an eclectic Edwardian free-style composition. Its entrance facade is dominated by a broad Dutch gable and an octagonal tower with a domed roof. The building sustained damage when the neighbouring Crofton Park Station was bombed in 1940 and 1945, losing two glass dome skylights and the leaded glass in the ground floor windows. The library was refurbished in 1959–60. The library building has been given local listing by Lewisham Borough Council, which describes it as making "a handsome contribution towards the streetscape".

In 2011, the library was outsourced by the council to be run as a Community run model, by Eco Computer Systems, now renamed Eco Communities. The library takes computer and book donations to help with the running costs of the building. The library is staffed by volunteers which meant unlike the Council run libraries it was closed for much of the COVID-19 pandemic lockdowns, finally reopening in April 2021.

Calico Projects took over in 2024 and extended the opening hours to the six day service that operates today.https://calicoprojects.com/about/

== Cultural life and leisure ==
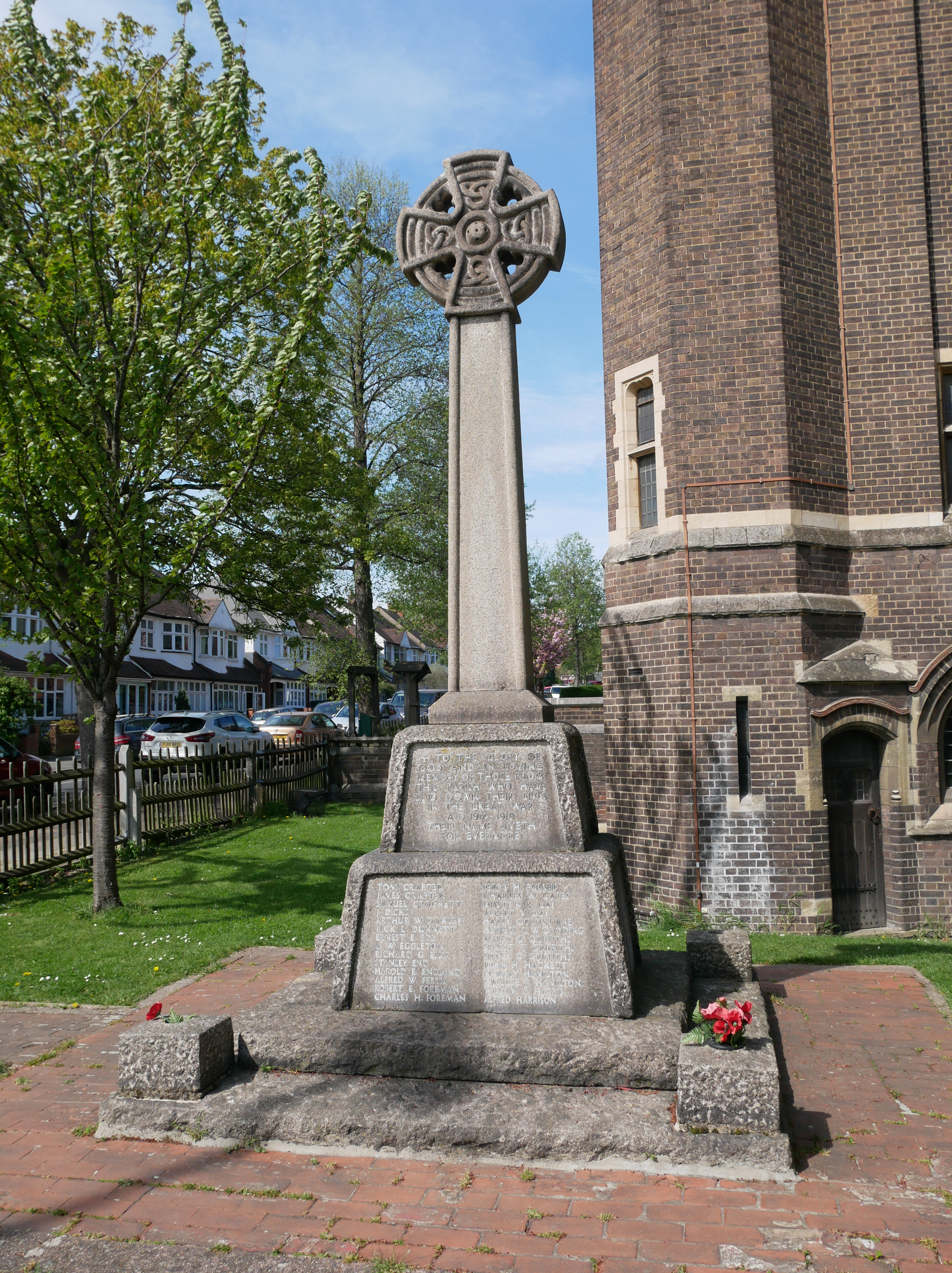
The Crofton Park war memorial, a Grade II listed structure

=== Brockley Jack Theatre ===
When the rebuilt Brockley Jack pub opened in 1898, it had a large function room at the rear of the building. The room has been used variously as a dance hall, a snooker room and a music venue, and by the 1980s, as nothing much at all. A small group of local actors, David Kincaid, Peter Rocca and Michael Bottle, hit upon the idea of staging dramatic productions in this back room. So, in 1993, the first of these ventures took place: 'An evening with Chekhov', featuring two one-handers, 'On the harmfulness of tobacco' and 'Swan Song'. David and Michael starred and Peter directed.

There was no finance and virtually no facilities but the short run proved a big success, especially with local people.

Gradually, with help of the brewery, Greene King, finance was secured, the room has been transformed over the years into the vibrant little theatre, that is now a fully equeped. It has now become a hub of local creativity, staging plays as diverse as 'Julius Caesar', 'Of Mice and Men', 'She Stoops to Conquer' and 'Lilies'. New writing is fostered by in regular workshops, part of the 'Write Now Festival'. Artistic Director Kate Bannister and Theatre Manager Karl Swinyard were awarded Best Venue Directors in the Fringe Report Awards 2011.

=== Rivoli Ballroom ===
Originally built as Crofton Park Picture Palace in 1913, the early cinema was renamed the Rivoli in 1929 and subsequently turned into a ballroom. It has a beautifully conserved interior which largely dates from the 1950s, although the Brockley Road elevation dates from 1931 and the barrel-vaulted ballroom ceiling (originally the cinema auditorium) is also earlier.

It was saved from development as a block of flats after English Heritage gave it a Grade II listing in 2007. A feature in Country Life described it as: "the best dance space in the country".

The English Heritage listing rests largely on the Rivoli's 1950s makeover, describing it as a: "luxuriant, exotic and deeply theatrical" interior, little altered since 1960. Its listing notes that it has special historic interest as witness to the important dance trends of the 1950s and '60s – also noting that attending a dance at Rivoli Ballroom is listed in Time Out's list of 101 things to do in London.

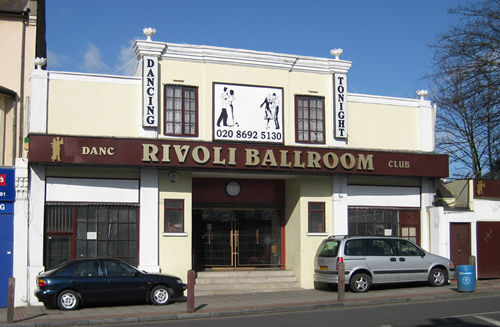
The Rivoli Ballroom, Crofton Park

In 2012, it was included in a feature in The Guardian about London's hidden interiors. Described as a popular location of music, fashion and TV shoots because of its kitsch and authentic interior, the article also notes: "There is nothing quite like it anywhere else in London."

It maintains a lively calendar of events, including cabaret, dance competitions and themed evenings, including tea dances, and Jackie's Juke Box, a mixed gay/straight night every month which regularly attracts between 200 and 300 people.

== Transport ==
The area has a network of rail and bus services, with connections to central London and Kent.

=== National Rail ===
Crofton Park Station opened in July 1892. It is served by Thameslink services to London Blackfriars (for the South Bank and Bankside), City Thameslink (for the City and St Paul's Cathedral), Farringdon (which will connect with the Crossrail network) and St Pancras International (for Channel Tunnel services). In the southbound direction the service links to Catford, Bromley and Sevenoaks. Disabled access entrances to Crofton Park station were opened from Marnock and Lindal Road in 2008. The station ticket office is open every weekday morning, and an automatic Metro ticket machine is also available.

The South London Rail Utilisation Strategy published by Network Rail in March 2008 proposed improvements to rail services along the Catford loop line (through Crofton Park). These include four stopping Thameslink services per hour at this station, and a Victoria to Bellingham service to provide additional trains per hour.

There are three other train stations within a ten to 15-minute walk of Crofton Park Station: Brockley railway station, Honor Oak Park and Ladywell.

Honor Oak Park and Brockley stations provide rail links to London Bridge, London Victoria, Shoreditch High Street, Highbury & Islington, Crystal Palace, Sydenham, East and West Croydon and Caterham. Both stations are served by Southern and since 2010 London Overground services.

=== Bus ===
A number of bus services operate throughout the area providing links to the West End/The city. Services include:

- 171 – Bellingham Catford to Holborn (via Peckham, Elephant and Castle, and Waterloo)
- N171 – Bellingham Catford to Tottenham Court Road bus station
- 172 – Brockley Rise to St Paul's (via Old Kent Road, Elephant and Castle, and Waterloo)
- 122 – Crystal Palace to Plumstead
- P4 – Brixton Station to Lewisham Station (via Dulwich Village)
- 284 – Lewisham Station to Grove Park

== Local government ==
Crofton Park electoral ward includes part of the Honor Oak Park area and is one of 18 wards in the London Borough of Lewisham. It is currently represented by two Labour councillors and one Liberal Democrat who were elected on 6 May 2010 when the general election and London Borough elections took place on the same day.

Across Lewisham, Labour gained heavily from the other parties, taking the council from no overall control to a Labour majority of 24 seats. The Liberal Democrats lost a net of five seats, Crofton Park ward being the party's only gain from Labour anywhere in London. This change was put down to the rapid gentrification of the local area.

Local election results for Crofton Park Ward, Lewisham Borough Council 2002, 2006 and 2010.
	% 2002	Votes 2006	% 2006	Votes 2010	% 2010
TURNOUT	25.56%		30.05%		64.8%
Candidates for the Labour Party	49.46%	2,897	35.00%	6,404	35.77%
Candidates for the Liberal Democrats	15.78%	1,670	20.18%	5,833	32.58%
Candidates for the Green Party	13.31%	2,062	24.92%	2,793	15.60%
Candidates for the Conservative Party	15.81%	1,647	19.90%	2,589	14.46%
Candidate for Lewisham For People Not Profit	n/a	n/a	n/a	282	1.58%
Candidate for Local Education Action by Parents	5.60%	n/a	n/a	n/a	n/a

== Schools ==
The in the years 2007–2008 renovated Crofton School – now renamed Prendergast Ladywell School – is the main secondary school in the area and is located on Manwood Road. The area has a number of primary schools, including:

- Beecroft Garden Primary School (formerly known as Brockley Primary School) which was rebuilt in 2011–12
- Stillness Infant And Junior Schools in Brockley Rise

== Health ==
Healthcare for the area is commissioned by Lewisham CCG. There is a modern teaching hospital a short walk away. There are two pharmacies in the area, as well as a local opticians

== Football Team ==
Crofton Park Football Club was formed in May 2007 and is the area's local side.

== Famous residents ==
- Jim Connell (1852–1929), writer of the anthem, "The Red Flag", lived close to St Hilda's Church at 22A Stondon Park. A maroon commemorative plaque was unveiled there by Lewisham Council in February 1989.
- British film, radio and music hall comedian Will Hay (1888–1949) lived at 7 Eddystone Road and later 40 Merritt Road, Crofton Park as a child in the late 1890s. He also attended the nearby Brockley Primary School (now renamed Beecroft Garden Primary School).
- Irish comedian Spike Milligan (1918–2002) lived at 50 Riseldine Road (which is on the Crofton Park side of Honor Oak) in the late 1930s, a few years after coming to England from India. A silver birch tree has been planted in his memory in front of Crofton Park Library.

== Nearest places ==
- Brockley
- Honor Oak
- Ladywell
- East Dulwich
- Nunhead
- Lewisham
- Forest Hill
- Catford
- Greenwich

== Nearest railway stations ==
- Crofton Park railway station
- Honor Oak Park railway station
- Ladywell railway station
- Brockley railway station
- Forest Hill railway station
- Catford railway station
- Catford Bridge railway station
