= Ladywell =

Coordinates: 51.453°N 0.017°W

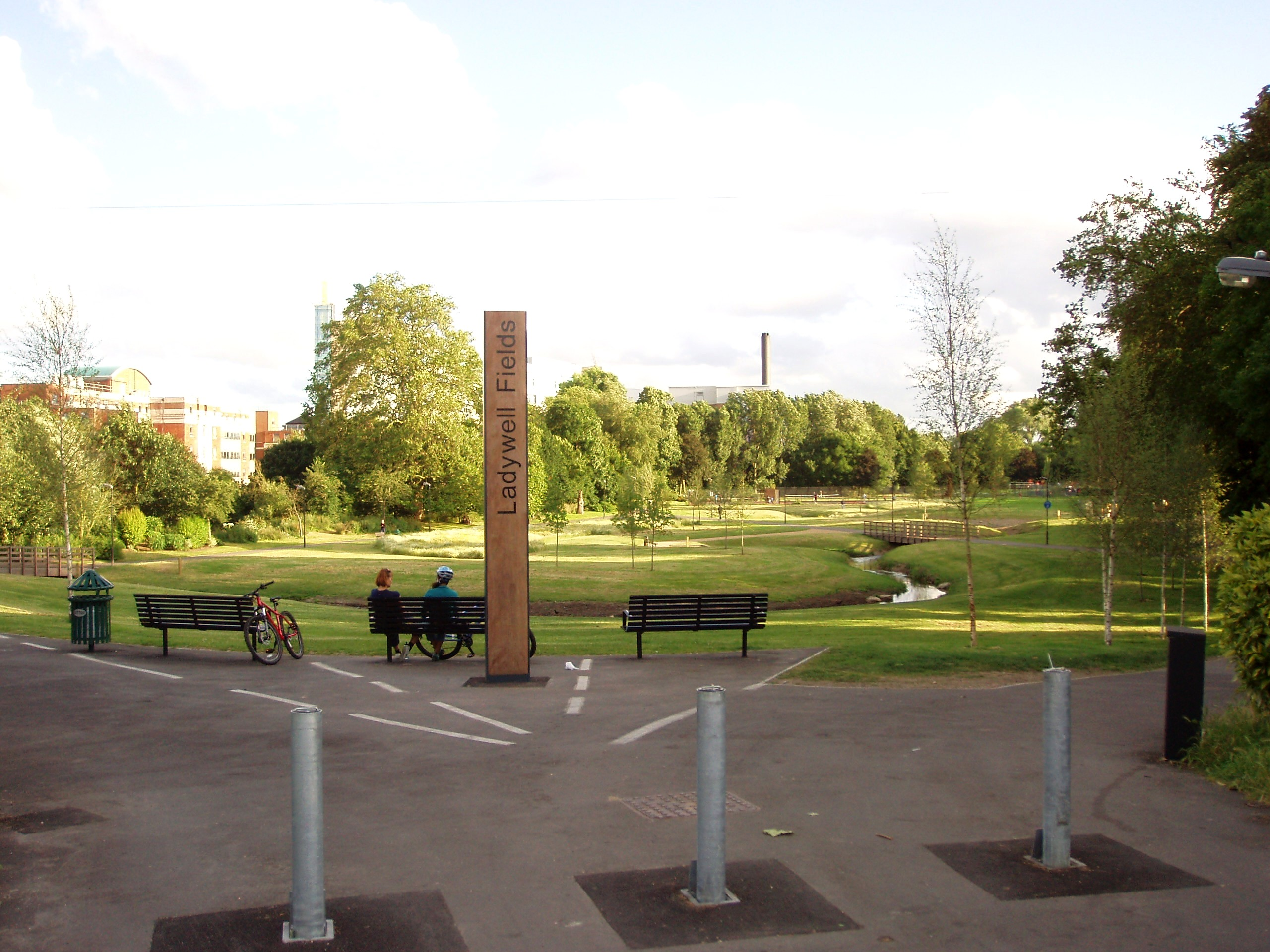
- Ladywell Fields

- Location within Greater London
- Population: 14,515 (2011 Census. Ward)
- OS grid reference: TQ37777459
- London borough: Lewisham
- Ceremonial county: Greater London
- Region: London
- Country: England
- Sovereign state: United Kingdom
- Post town: LONDON
- Postcode district: SE13, SE4
- Dialling code: 020
- Police: Metropolitan
- Fire: London
- Ambulance: London
- UK Parliament: Lewisham North
- London Assembly: Greenwich and Lewisham

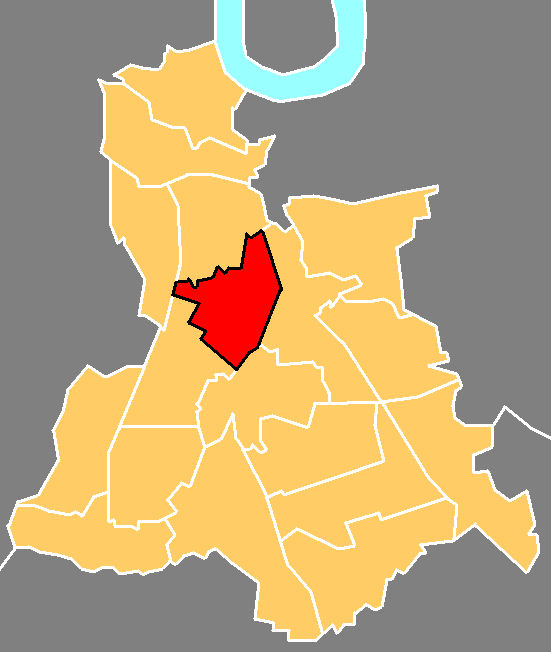
The electoral ward of Ladywell (red) within the London Borough of Lewisham (orange)

Ladywell is an area in Lewisham in South East London, England, and a ward in the London Borough of Lewisham between Brockley, Crofton Park and Lewisham proper. It has ample green space including Ladywell Fields and Hilly Fields which borders Brockley. Ladywell Village, the main shopping area along Ladywell Road, was given a facelift in 2013 with £800,000 of Transport for London funding. The pavements were widened, short stay bays created to help local businesses and shoppers, and trees were added. Ladywell Village has a range of retail outlets including a number of cafes, a patisserie and a delicatessen.

== History ==
The name Ladywell was in use by the 15th century, and maps dating to this period show the site of the original Lady well, in front of the area later to be occupied by the Freemason's Arms and now marked by a plaque.

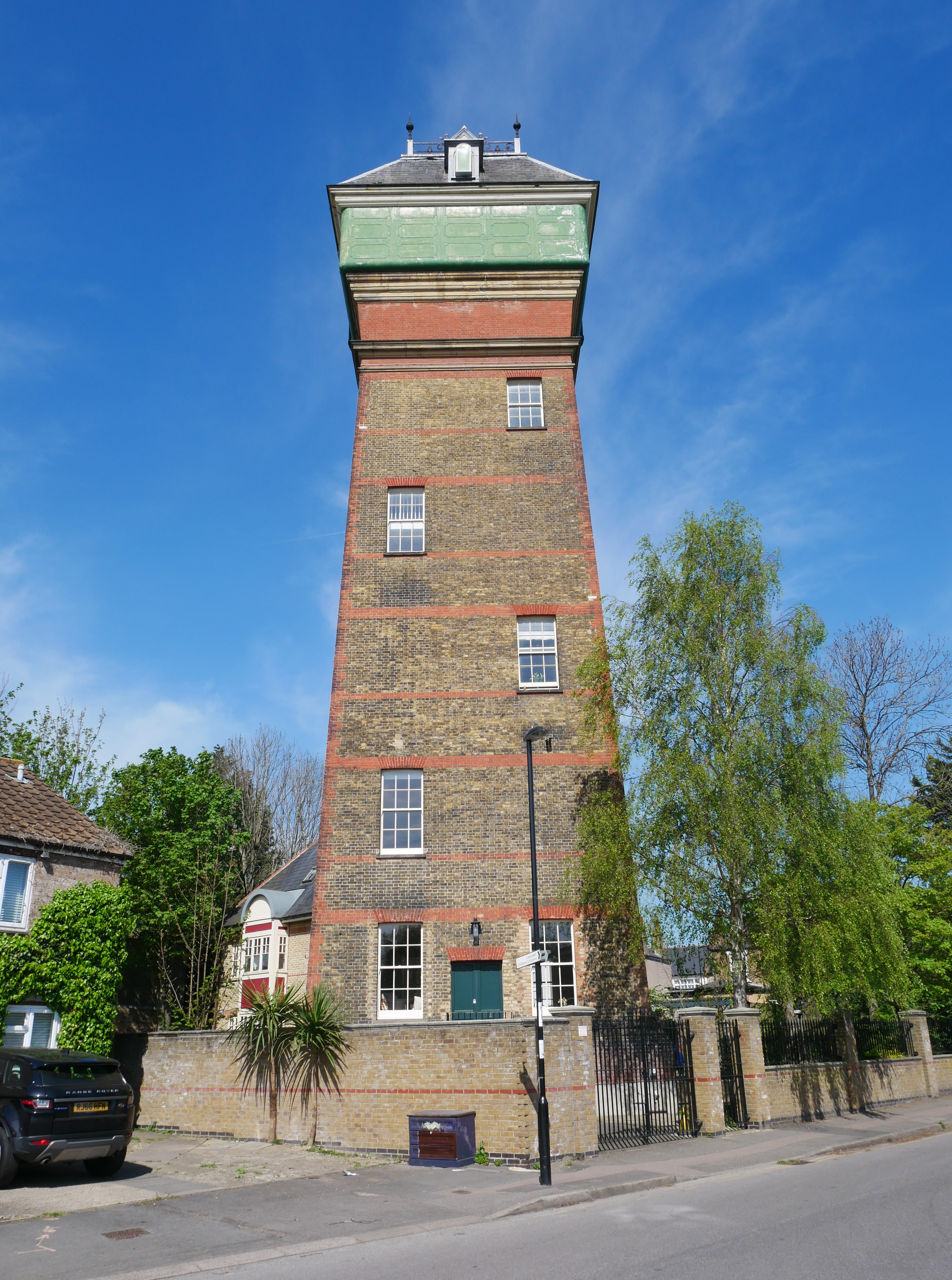
The water tower in Ladywell, completed in 1900

The well was probably a holy well dedicated to Virgin Mary and was 1.8 m to 2 m (six to seven feet) deep and surrounded by an iron railing. It was in use until the 1850s, when it was covered over as part of the construction of the railway. The coping stones of this well were later uncovered during work to underpin the railway bridge, and rescued by a signalman. In 1896 they were incorporated as part of the fountain that stood in the grounds of the Ladywell Public Baths, a local landmark built in red brick in 1884.

Another well is located nearby at what is now 148 Ladywell Road. This was a mineral spring, the waters of which local people drank for medicinal purposes.

Until the second half of the eighteenth century there were few dwellings in Ladywell, the most notable being 'The Bridge House Farm' and Ladywell House. Ladywell House was the vicarage built in 1693 for Dean George Stanhope, the vicar of Lewisham and Deptford. Stanhope was a friend of the writer Jonathan Swift, Swift visited Ladywell House in 1711. The house was extended in 1881 and 1895, and is now used by the South London and Maudsley NHS Foundation Trust.

The opening of Ladywell Station in 1857 brought expansion to the area. Church Grove and the terraces to either side of it in Ladywell Road were built in the following year, which also saw the opening of Ladywell Cemetery, Railway Terrace, Prospect Place, and Mercy Terrace. The public park Ladywell Fields opened in the 1890s. Hilly Fields park opened on 16 May 1896 after campaigning by one of the Founders of the National Trust, Octavia Hill.

== Conservation area ==
Designated in 2010, the area consists mainly of late Victorian suburban residential development which was built by the local developer Samuel J. Jerrard. In the conservation area, external changes to elevations visible from public viewpoints require planning permission. These include:

- Changes to windows, doors, chimneys and other material alterations.
- Alterations to the roof of a house.
- The addition of a porch. This would include infilling an open porch.
- Construction of any building within the grounds of a house where this would be visible from any public viewpoint.
- Putting down a hard surface, for example a drive, or replacing an existing drive.
- New boundary treatments like gates, walls and fences and the demolition of the original.
- The painting of the exterior of a dwelling house or building within the grounds of the building.

Through the 1880s and 1890s Jerrard built up long stretches of Vicars Hill and the newly laid out streets Algernon Road, Algiers Road, Ermine and Embleton Road, taking advantage of the topography and the good transport links to London.

His houses are generously sized and are stylistically distinctive as a group. Many of his other houses in the area are protected within the Brockley conservation area.

Jerrard’s development in Ladywell survives nearly complete, including its rich architectural detailing. It constitutes the core of the conservation area, supplemented by some later infill development of the late 19th and early 20th century that completed his streets.

The conservation area also encompasses the commercial core of Ladywell along Ladywell Road, known as Ladywell Village, which contains some of the oldest houses and pubs of the area and Edwardian shops that were constructed at the turn of the century in response to the rapidly increasing community around them.

The Council recommends a number of improvements that could be made to the benefit of both the character of the area as well as the value of individuals’ properties:

- reinstatement of painted timber windows to the original design. These will in most, but not all cases be vertical sliding sash windows
- reinstatement of original style doors, such as the Victorian glass and timber panelled doors that can be found on most of the Jerrard properties,
- the removal of later porch additions,
- removal of render or pebbledash where not part of the original design,
- reinstatement of terracotta chimney pots, chimney stacks or ridge tiles where missing,
- reinstatement of slate roofs,
- repair or reinstatement of any other architectural detail where lost,
- front garden improvements such as the reinstatement of stock brick walls with stone copings; planting of shrubs, lawns and hedging to hide wheelie bins, and the repair or reinstatement of York stone or tile paths,
- re‐siting of satellite dishes to inconspicuous locations such as the rear garden,
- reinstatement of traditional shopfronts and removal of internally illuminated signs.

== Local politics ==
Ladywell is a ward of Lewisham Council, represented by three councillors who are elected every four years.

Ladywell - 2018 Election (3)
Party	Candidate	Votes	%	±%
Labour	Liz Johnston-Franklin	2,420		
Labour	Carl Handley	2,125		
Labour	Bill Brown	1,850		
Green	Corin Ashwell	1,495		
Women's Equality	Rebecca Jones	1,188		
Green	John Keidan	989		
Green	Matt Barker	898		
Liberal Democrats	Deborah Hudson	411		
Conservative	Catriona Archer	334		
Liberal Democrats	Richard Hebditch	290		
Liberal Democrats	Tony Lloyd	275		
Conservative	Camilla Harper	257		
Conservative	Edmund Stewart	215		
Majority				
Turnout				

Ladywell - 2014 Election (3)
Party	Candidate	Votes	%	±%
Labour	Bill Brown	2,038		
Labour	Liz Johnston-Franklin	1,960		
Labour	Carl Handley	1,860		
Green	Michael Keogh	1,335		
Green	Andrea Carey Fuller	1,221		
Green	Clare Phipps	1,092		

== Notable people ==
- Birthplace of Rolling Stones' bassist Bill Wyman.
- Burial place of Ernest Dowson poet and decadent buried at Brockley and Ladywell Cemeteries
- Henry Williamson, author of Tarka the Otter brought up in Ladywell. No 21 Eastern Road has a blue plaque to commemorate that he lived there
- Yung Filly, YouTuber, brought up in Ladywell

== Local societies ==
There are two local societies. The Ladywell Village Improvement Group and the Ladywell Society

== Transport ==
Ladywell station itself is on Southeastern's Hayes Line with direct trains to Elmers End, Hayes, London Bridge, Cannon Street, Waterloo East and Charing Cross.

It has been proposed to extend the Bakerloo line to Ladywell

Other close stations:

- Lewisham
- Crofton Park
- Brockley
