= Daniel Hoevels =

Swedish-born German theater actor (born 1978)

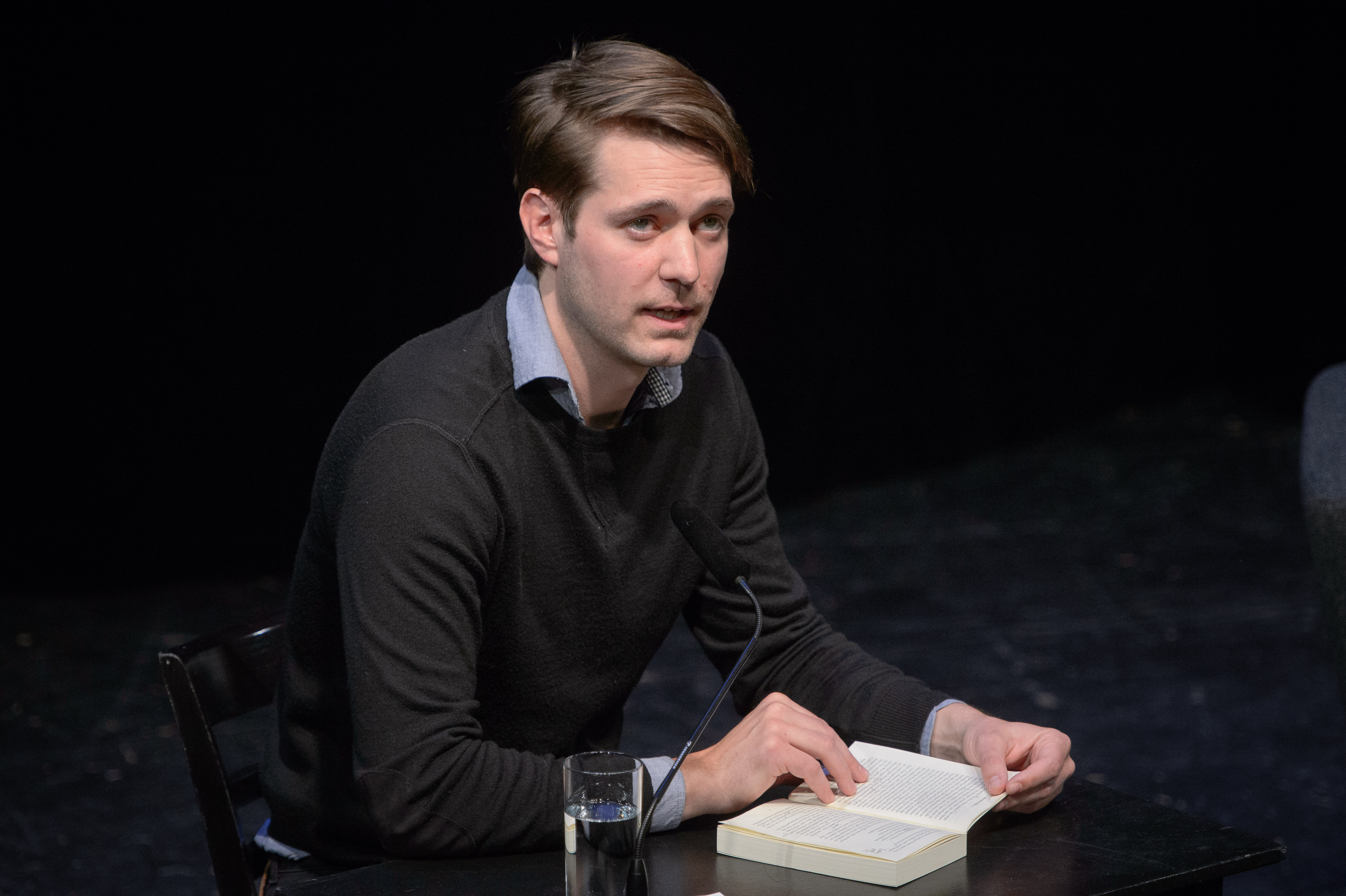

Daniel Hoevels (born 10 March 1978) is a Swedish-born German theater actor.

== Early life and acting career ==
Hoevels was born in Sweden. After three years studying politics in Berlin at Freie Universität Berlin, he trained as an actor at the Hochschule für Musik und Theater in Hamburg between 2001 and 2004, and acted in some films and theater productions in Hamburg during that time. He joined the Thalia Theater Hamburg in 2004, where his first roles were Huck in Tom Sawyer and Huckleberry Finn, Haimon in Christine Eders's Antigone, and the Duke of Burgundy in Andreas Kriegenburg's production of Shakespeare's King Lear. His subsequent Shakespearean roles have been Lysander in A Midsummer Night's Dream and Romeo Montague in Romeo and Juliet. From 2005 to 2009 he was part of Thalia Theater Hamburg. From 2009 on he works at Deutsches Theater Berlin. He is noted for bringing a touch of comedy to rather serious roles.

== Accidental stabbing ==
On 6 December 2008, Hoevels slit his neck while playing "Mortimer" in Mary Stuart, written by Friedrich Schiller. His character's suicide scene was to feature a dull knife, but it was damaged and was replaced by a sharp one. Thalia - the theatre company - requested that the sharp one be dulled too, though this was "carelessly" disregarded. The near-fatal knife was bought at a local store and reportedly still contained a price tag.

Austrian police forces are currently investigating who failed to blunt the knife. They have not ruled out the possibility of a conspiracy, and some rumors claim that the knife was replaced by a rival of Hoevels. They reportedly questioned the cast and crew and performed DNA tests.

When Hoevels collapsed on the Burgtheater's stage, the audience reportedly began to clap. They thought that the blood spilling from Hoevels's neck was some sort of special effect. No one realised he was injured until he did not take a bow after the show.

The actor was taken to a hospital, where he was given stitches. He survived the incident because the blade barely missed his carotid artery. Hoevels returned to acting at the Burgtheater the next day.

A spokeswoman for the Burgtheater later said that reports were exaggerated and that the audience did not applaud. Police denied that an investigation had been launched or that DNA tests of cast and crew were done.

=== Later performance ===
Hoevels returned to Hamburg on 8 December. He was to play the character Willi in The New Sorrows of Young W. by Ulrich Plenzdorf. Coincidentally, the main character Edgar Wibeau was also to commit suicide in the play.
