= Ladywell Fields =

Park in the London Borough of Lewisham, England

- Ladywell Recreation Ground
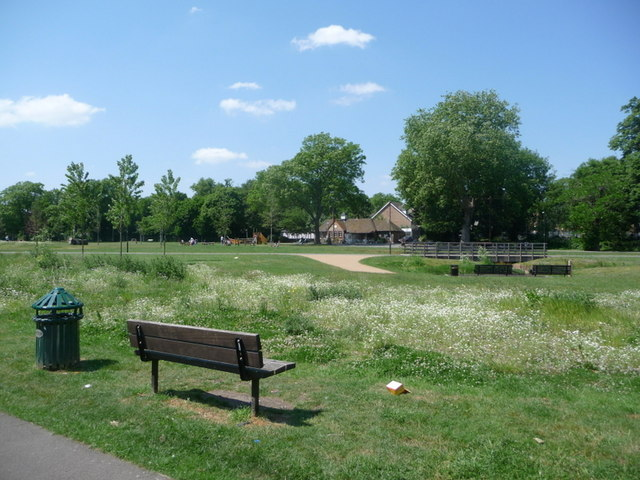
- Ladywell Fields was originally ancient water meadows traversed by the River Ravensbourne photo: Chris Downer, geograph.org.uk
- Interactive map of Ladywell Fields
- Type: public park
- Location: London, England
- Coordinates: 51°27′21″N 0°01′05″W
- Area: 22 hectares (54 acres)
- Created: 1889–1894
- Operator: London Borough of Lewisham
- Open: 8am-sunset
- Status: Open year round
- Website: lewisham.gov.uk

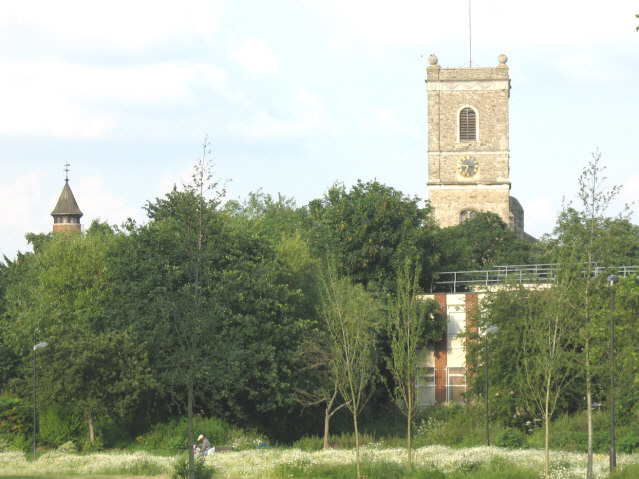
St Mary the Virgin church viewed from Ladywell Fields photo: Stephen Craven, geograph.org.uk

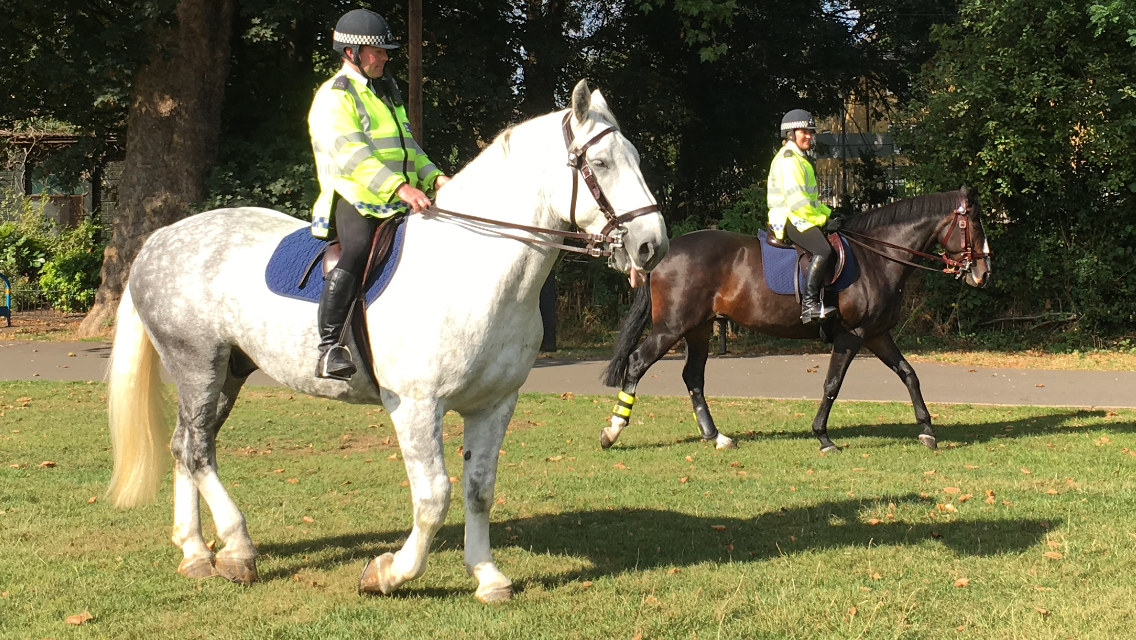
Horses in the park

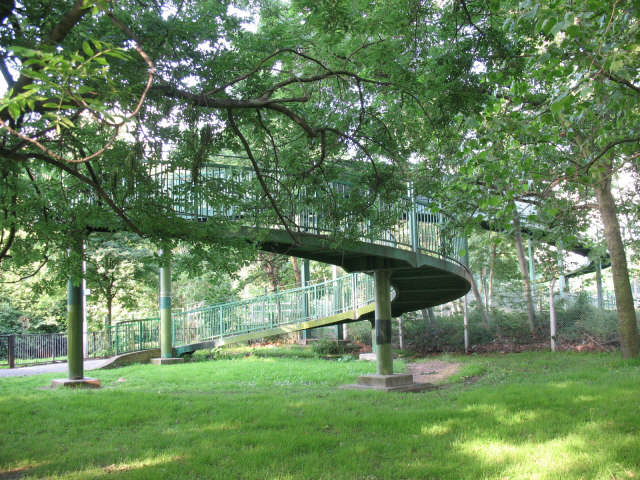
A spiral bridge that takes the Waterlink Way across the railway line that runs alongside Ladywell Fields photo: Stephen Craven, geograph.org.uk

Ladywell Fields, originally Ladywell Recreation Ground is a public park in the London Borough of Lewisham created from three historic fields. It is located near Ladywell railway station at the northern end of the park, and Catford Bridge at the southern end.

== History of the park ==
The site is mentioned in the Domesday Book, as meadows in the manor of Lewisham. A medicinal well – ‘our lady’s well’ – said to be named after nearby St Mary the Virgin Church was first recorded in 1472. It was reputed to be effective for curing eye complaints. The well is now underneath the access road to Ladywell station and a further well lies to the west of it.

Ladywell began to develop as a suburb of London with the arrival of the railway station in 1857, and in 1889 land between the River Ravensbourne and the station was bought by London County Council and Lewisham District Board of Works. Further parcels of land were bought in 1891 and ’94 and the whole area was laid out as a public amenity and named Ladywell Recreation Ground. According to author and historian Nick Barratt, Ladywell Recreation Ground was purchased for the parish in 1889.

== Layout and notable features ==
The is park, which consists of three adjoining fields, extends to 22 hectares (54 acres) and follows the course of the River Ravensbourne. It includes a wide range of recreation facilities, including play areas, skate park and ball courts, bowling green and football pitch. There is a café on site, and the park is part of the Waterlink Way cycling and walking route that extends from the River Thames at Creekside, Deptford to Sydenham.

There are a variety of mature trees on the site, including field maple, hybrid black poplar and, on the river bank, a large European White Elm Ulmus laevis (identity confirmed by dendrologist Owen Johnson from its distinctive fruit), which bears a Great Trees of London plaque currently (2025) mislabelled 'Klemmer' or 'Flanders elm'; these plaques denote trees considered of importance to the capital. The northern part of the park features a small nature reserve.

The original park design featured riverside plantings and rustic bridges over the Ravensbourne. Since the land was originally water meadows, and therefore liable to flooding, extensive work was done prior to the park’s opening and, over time, the river channel was straightened, widened and weirs added.

== Recent park restoration and improvements ==
The River Ravensbourne is the major natural feature of the park's three fields, but previous work to reduce flooding had affected its aesthetic, recreational and environmental value. Alongside other river-straightening and canalisations, this resulted in increasingly frequent downstream flooding where the Quaggy and Ravensbourne met in Lewisham town centre.

Informed by the successful ecological and natural flood defence restoration of Chinbrook Meadows, in 2007/8 £400,000 of works were carried out in the northern field. Called QUERCUS and part funded by the European Union, this diverted the river through the middle of the park, creating an area for river dipping and paddling, as well as flood buffering to protect downstream Lewisham town centre from high rainfall events.

A major £2m project followed, two years later, funded by the London Development Agency and won 'best new public space' in the London Planning Awards 2011. Renovation, which was undertaken by BDP and East Architecture, included redesigned footpaths, river viewing platforms, an orchard and meadows. The river channel was modified to create a more naturalistic setting incorporating backwaters, wetlands and riverside tree planting – all designed to create more sustainable drainage and reduce flooding. This restoration also gave the park a new entrance, adventure playground and tennis courts.

== External sources ==
- PDF map showing Waterlink Way and including Ladywell Fields
- History and maps on Ideal Homes
