= The Faction Theatre Company =

The Faction is a London-based theatre company. Founded in 2008 by Mark Leipacher, the company has become known for its contemporary takes on classic plays. They are a reperatory company, though they often work with independent artists and playwrights.

== Company ==
The Faction is led by two artistic directors; founder Mark Leipacher and Rachel Valentine Smith. The company is supported by a core ensemble of eleven actors and associate artists.

=== Ensemble ===
- Alex Guiney
- Amelia Donkor
- Anna-Maria Nabirye
- Christopher Hughes
- Christopher York
- Clare Latham
- Gareth Fordred
- Jude Owusu
- Kate Sawyer
- Lachlan McCall
- Natasha Rickman

=== Associate artists ===
- Gareth Jandrell – Playwright
- Emily Juniper – Playwright
- Suzie Foster – Stage Manager
- Max Pappenheim – Sound Designer
- Chris Withers – Lighting Designer

== History ==
After seeing the Schaubühne Berlin at Edinburgh International Festival in 2004, Mark Leipacher created The Faction Theatre Company in 2008. The Faction became a registered charity in 2011. Their first production was Richard III at the Brockley Jack Theatre, London, in October 2008.

During The Faction's formative years, they toured across the UK, played studio theatres across London, and established an open-air season in Brockwell Park. They were then invited to be an associate ensemble of the New Diorama Theatre. With the support of their 5-year relationship at The New Diorama, The Faction was able to trial a more permanent model of working in repertory theatre, with a core ensemble.

Since 2012, The Faction have produced five annual sell-out repertory seasons, engaging with over 26,000 audience members and 4,000 students. In 2016, The Faction partnered with Selfridges to create an auditorium in their Oxford Street store for Shakespeare 400 celebrations, where they produced a version of Much Ado About Nothing to critical acclaim. The Faction took their work even further afield later that year, in partnership with the British Council, and the American University of Beirut, producing and co-directing an Arabic premiere production of King Lear.

In addition to Shakespeare, The Faction have produced work by other classic writers such Cervantes, Euripides, Gorky, Lorca and Schiller. They also bridge the divide between classics and new writing by engaging some of the UK's lsser-known writers. To date, this has included Ranjit Bolt (Three Sisters), Gareth Jandrell (Thebes, published by Bloomsbury Methuen Drama), Emily Juniper (Miss Julie and Vassa Zheleznova) and two unique projects: Reptember and Demetrius.

Reptember is an Offies-nominated project, consisting of 12 classic texts adapted for solo performance by several playwrights, including Jessica Sian and Will Gore.

Demetrius is an ongoing portmanteau project to complete Schiller's final unfinished work. Established writers such as April de Angelis, Glyn Maxwell and Simon Reade complete a "unit" before passing the baton to up and coming writers like Jon Brittain and Daniel Kanaber.

== Productions ==
- 2008
  - Richard III – Shakespeare
- 2009
  - Macbeth – Shakespeare
  - Twelfth Night – Shakespeare
- 2010
  - The Tempest – Shakespeare
  - Intrigue/Love – Schiller in a version by Mark Leipacher & Daniel Millar
  - Canterbury Tales – Chaucer
  - The Robbers – Schiller in a version by Mark Leipacher & Daniel Millar
- 2011
  - Strindberg's Apartment – Strindberg adapted by Simon Reade
  - The Odyssey – Homer
  - A Midsummer Night's Dream – Shakespeare
  - Arabian Nights – Folklore
- 2012
  - Twelfth Night – Shakespeare
  - Mary Stuart – Schiller in a version by Mark Leipacher & Daniel Millar
  - Miss Julie – Strindberg in a version by Emily Juniper
  - Othello – Shakespeare
- 2013
  - Fiesco – Schiller in a version by Mark Leipacher & Daniel Millar
  - Three Sisters – Chekhov in a version by Ranjit Bolt
  - Blood Wedding – Lorca in a version by Gareth Jandrell
- 2014
  - Hamlet – Shakespeare
  - Thebes – Aeschylus in a version by Gareth Jandrell
  - Shakespeare's Lovers – Shakespeare
  - Reptember: Solo – Various
- 2015
  - Romeo & Juliet – Shakespeare
  - The Talented Mr Ripley – Highsmith in a version by Mark Leipacher
  - Joan of Arc – Schiller in a version by Mark Leipacher
- 2016
  - Richard III – Shakespeare
  - Reptember Reloaded: Solo Season – Various
  - Vassa Zheleznova – Gorky in a version by Emily Juniper
  - Much Ado About Nothing – Shakespeare
  - King Lear – Shakespeare (Arabic language premiere, Lebanon)
- 2017
  - Schillerfest - Various Artists
- 2018
  - A Midsummer Night's Dream – Shakespeare
  - My Name is Rachel Corrie – Corrie in a version by Alan Rickman and Katharine Viner
  - The Talented Mr Ripley – Highsmith in a version by Mark Leipache
- 2021
  - Medea/Worn – Euripides in a version by Emily Juniper
  - My Last Duchess – Browning in a version by Jessica Siân
  - The Faction Solos – Various Artists
- 2023
  - Macbeth – Shakespeare in a version by Mark Leipache
- 2025-2026
  - The Talented Mr Ripley – Tour; Highsmith in a version by Mark Leipache

== Awards ==
The Faction have been awarded the Peter Brook Ensemble Award, and has received Offies for Best Ensemble, or nominated for: Best Director; Best Actor (3 nominations); Best Supporting Actress; Best Supporting Actor; Best Lighting Design; Most Promising New Playwright; and TBC Award for the productions that defy traditional categories. In addition, The Faction were nominated at the London Theatre Awards for Best Artistic Director, and for the National Stage Management Awards' 'Individual Award'.
