= Crofton Park railway station =

National Rail station in London, England

Crofton Park
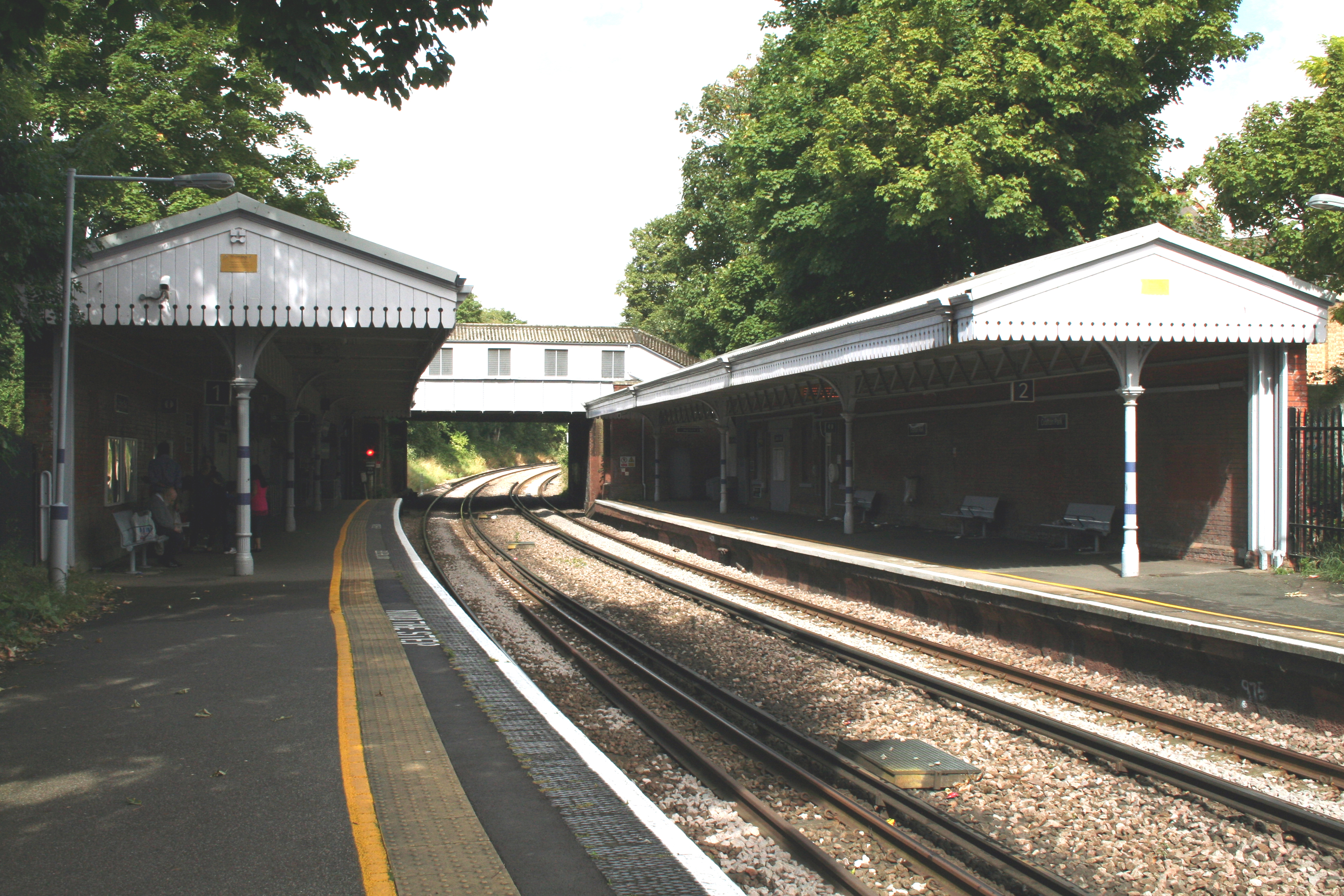
- Northbound view of the station in August 2012
- Interactive map of Crofton Park

General information
- Location: Crofton Park
- Local authority: London Borough of Lewisham
- Managed by: Thameslink
- Station code: CFT
- DfT category: E
- Number of platforms: 2
- Accessible: Yes
- Fare zone: 3

National Rail annual entry and exit
- 2020–21: ▼0.196 million
- 2021–22: ▲0.456 million
- 2022–23: ▲0.576 million
- 2023–24: ▲0.645 million
- 2024–25: ▲0.699 million

Key dates
- 1 July 1892: Opened

Other information
- External links: Departures; Facilities
- Coordinates: 51.455°N 0.0367°W

Crofton Park is a station on the Catford Loop line, between Nunhead and Catford. It is in London fare zone 3.

Crofton Park is in the historic centre of Brockley, in the London Borough of Lewisham and is 7 miles 11 chains (11.5 km) measured from London Victoria.

== Facilities ==
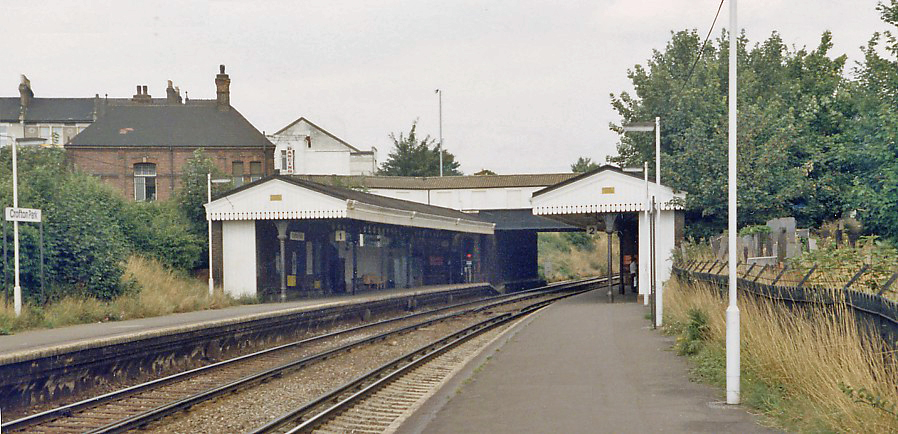
Crofton Park railway station in 1983

The station has an automated ticket machine on the overbridge. The Southeastern website in March 2014 advertised ticket office hours as 06:40-13:20 from Monday to Friday, with the office closed on weekends.

New level access facilities were constructed to avoid the stairs to the platform. There is now step-free access to platform 1 (northbound) from Marnock Road, and step-free access to platform 2 (southbound) from Lindal Road. There is also step-free access to the ticket office on Brockley Road – although it is a few minutes walk from the step free access points.

== Services ==
Off-peak, all services at Crofton Park are operated by Thameslink using Class 700 EMUs.

The typical off-peak service in trains per hour is:

- 2 tph to London Blackfriars
- 2 tph to Sevenoaks via Swanley

During the peak hours, additional services between Orpington, Kentish Town and Luton call at the station. In addition, the service to London Blackfriars is extended to and from Welwyn Garden City via Finsbury Park.

The station is also served by a number of peak hour Southeastern services between London Victoria, Rochester and Gillingham. The station is served by four trains to London Victoria in the morning peak and two trains to Rochester, one of which continues to Gillingham, in the evening peak.

Preceding station	National Rail	Following station
Nunhead	Thameslink Catford Loop Line	Catford
Denmark Hill	Southeastern Chatham Main Line Peak Hours Only	Bellingham
