= Farringdon station =

National rail and London Underground station

Farringdon
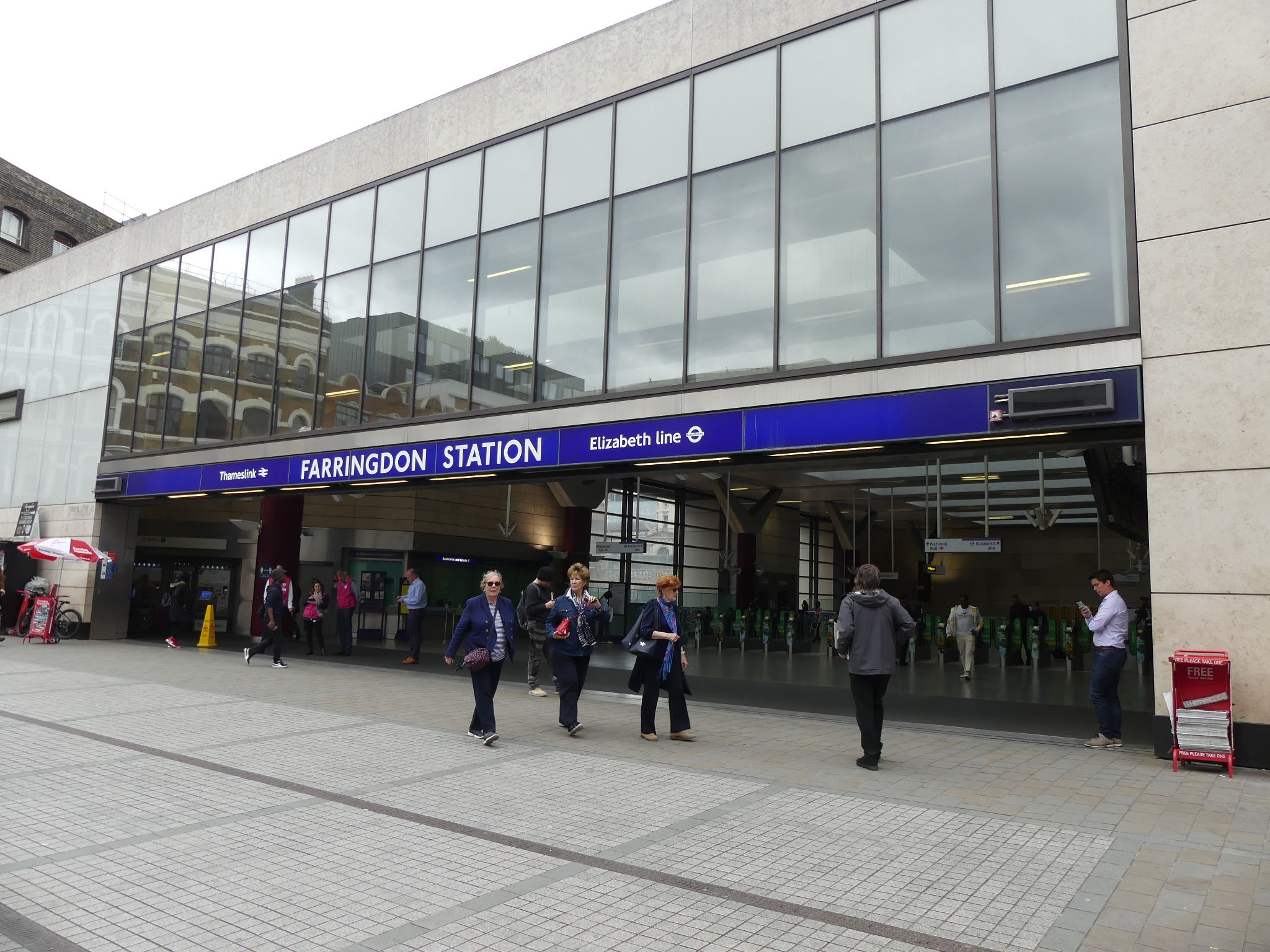
- Thameslink and Elizabeth line station entrance
- Interactive map of Farringdon

General information
- Location: Clerkenwell
- Local authority: London Borough of Islington
- Managed by: London Underground
- Owners: Transport for London; Network Rail
- Station code: ZFD
- DfT category: E
- Number of platforms: 6 (2 Thameslink) (2 London Underground) (2 Elizabeth line)
- Accessible: Yes
- Fare zone: 1

London Underground annual entry and exit
- 2021: ▲8.50 million
- 2022: ▲30.07 million
- 2023: ▲40.07 million
- 2024: ▼39.53 million
- 2025: ▲42.03 million

National Rail annual entry and exit
- 2020–21: ▼2.643 million
- Interchange: ▼0.118 million
- 2021–22: ▲6.865 million
- Interchange: ▲0.245 million
- 2022–23: ▲31.460 million
- Interchange: ▲0.640 million
- 2023–24: ▲46.050 million
- Interchange: ▲9.607 million
- 2024–25: ▲50.171 million
- Interchange: ▼9.342 million

Key dates
- 10 January 1863: Opened as Farringdon Street
- 23 December 1865: Resited
- 26 January 1922: Renamed Farringdon & High Holborn
- 21 April 1936: Renamed Farringdon
- 1 July 1936: Goods yard closed
- 1982: Electrified
- May 1988: Thameslink started
- 21 March 2009: Thameslink services to Moorgate discontinued
- 24 May 2022: Elizabeth line opened

Listed status
- Listed feature: Underground station
- Listing grade: II
- Entry number: 1298047
- Added to list: 17 May 1994; 32 years ago

Other information
- External links: TfL station info page; Departures; Facilities
- Coordinates: 51°31′14″N 00°06′18″W

Farringdon (/ˈfærɪŋdən/) is an interchange station located in Clerkenwell in the London Borough of Islington, just outside the boundary of the City of London for London Underground, Elizabeth line and National Rail services. It is in London fare zone 1.

The London Underground station is on the Circle, Hammersmith & City, and Metropolitan lines, between King's Cross St Pancras and Barbican stations. The Elizabeth line station is between Tottenham Court Road and Liverpool Street stations. The National Rail station is on the Thameslink route between St Pancras and City Thameslink.

Opened in 1863 as the terminus of the Metropolitan Railway, the world's first underground passenger railway, Farringdon is one of the oldest surviving underground railway stations in the world.

== History ==
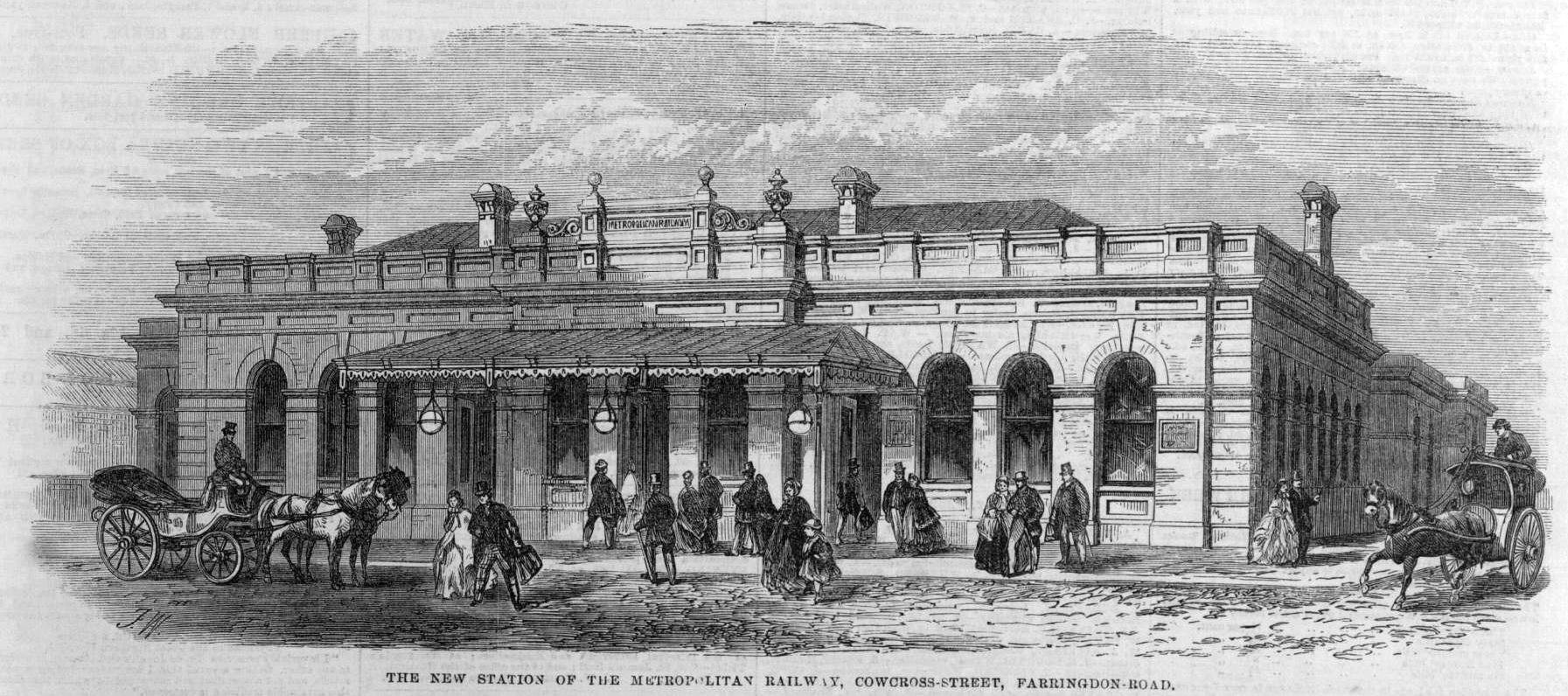
The Metropolitan Railway's second Farringdon station, 1866.

The station was opened on 10 January 1863 as the terminus of the original Metropolitan Railway, the world's first underground metro line. The station, initially named Farringdon Street, was originally a short distance from the present station building. The line ran from the Farringdon area to Paddington, a distance of 4 mi (6 km).

The station was relocated on 23 December 1865 when the Metropolitan Railway opened an extension to Moorgate. It was renamed Farringdon & High Holborn on 26 January 1922 when the new building by the architect Charles Walter Clark facing Cowcross Street was opened, and its present name was adopted on 21 April 1936. It was built in conjunction with a freight station to take livestock to a slaughterhouse to its south-east to supply Smithfield Market; remains of cattle ramps on a street outside the market, West Smithfield. Smithfield was redesignated as a wholesale 'deadmeat' market in the 19th century and the freight station was last used in the 1920s.

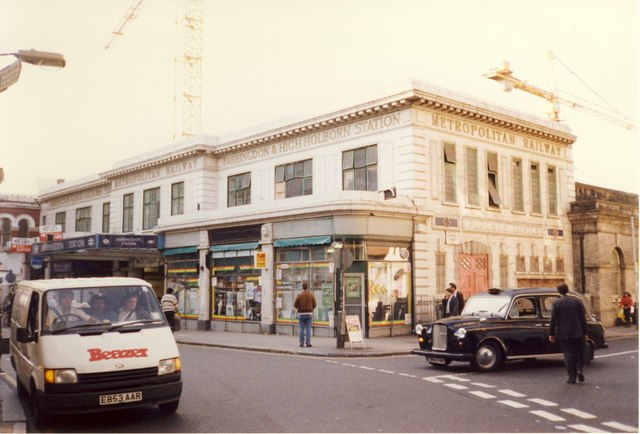
The station frontage carrying the name Farringdon & High Holborn, 1989.

The lines from Farringdon towards King's Cross St. Pancras run alongside the Fleet ditch, culverted since 1734. The station building is unusually well-preserved early 20th-century London Underground architecture. It retains indications of the Metropolitan Railway's main-line style operation such as a sign for a parcel office on the outer wall and some original signage, with the 1922–1936 name on the facade.

After the bay platforms at Blackfriars closed on 21 March 2009, Southeastern services that previously terminated at Blackfriars were extended to Kentish Town, St. Albans, Luton or Bedford, calling at this station. Thameslink trains to Moorgate ceased at the same time.

=== Recent and current developments ===
Farringdon has recently received significant upgrades to allow it to meet the needs of a series of major rail upgrade projects: The Thameslink Programme was a major upgrade to the existing north-south Thameslink route, enabling longer and more frequent trains, completed in 2018; and the Four Lines Modernisation involves the wholesale resignalling of the London Underground's sub-surface lines bringing a major boost in capacity to Circle, Hammersmith & City and Metropolitan line services calling at Farringdon. In addition the station has been significantly expanded to serve as a stop on the new east-west Elizabeth line providing interchange between Thameslink and the Elizabeth line.

Once all these projects have been completed, Farringdon will be one of the country's busiest stations with approximately 200 tph, an average of one departure every 20 seconds. A new building, housing a dedicated ticket hall, has been constructed to serve these extra passengers. The new building is to the immediate south of the original station, which itself has been upgraded as part of the programme.

An additional entrance has also been built at the north end of the original station, onto Turnmill Street.

==== Thameslink upgrade ====
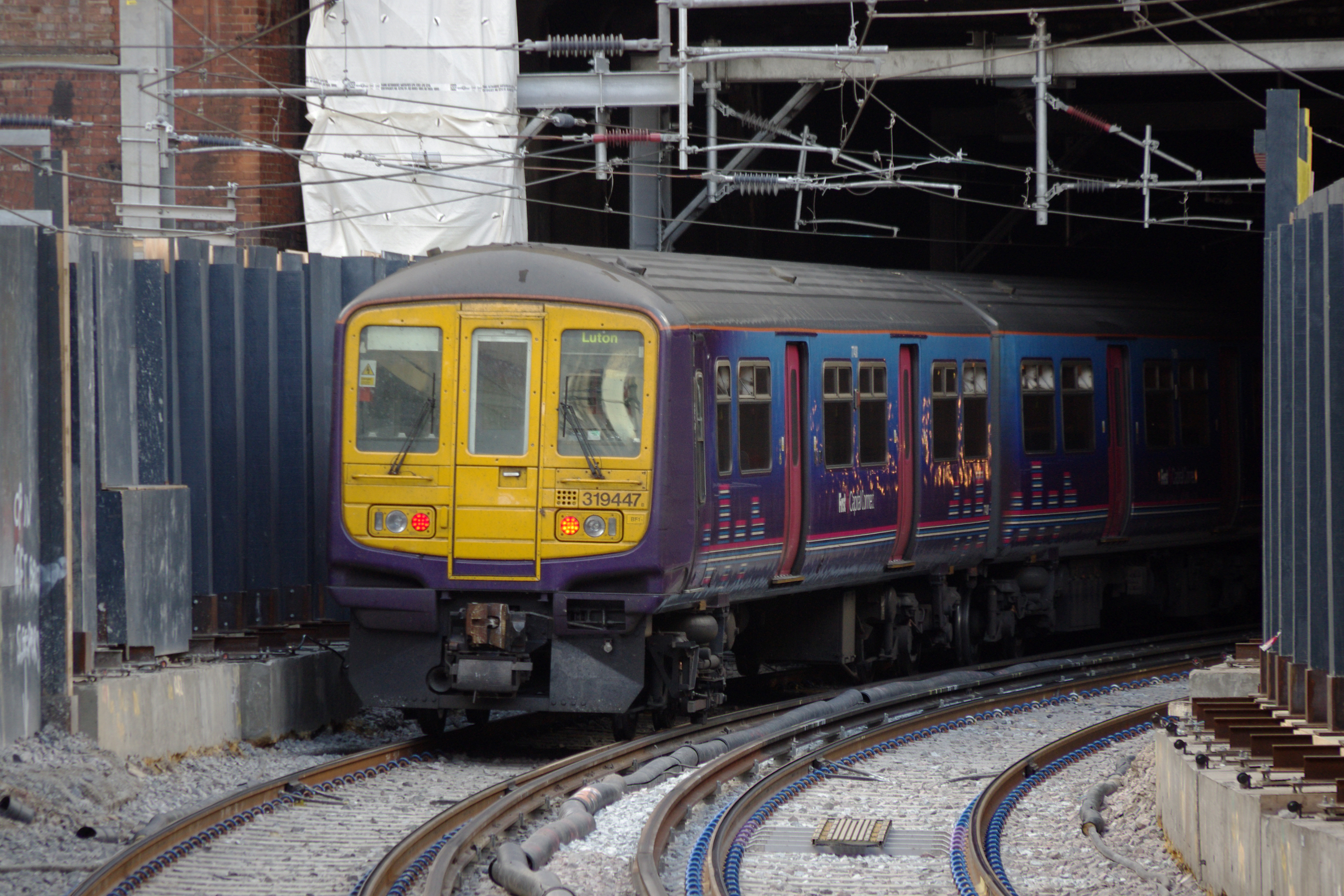
A Class 319 heads south from Farringdon. On the left is the blocked-off City Widened Line branch to Moorgate, closed as part of the Thameslink Programme.

Farringdon Station has been rebuilt to accommodate longer Thameslink trains and to make other improvements to the station. The existing station building has been refurbished with a new roof canopy covering the north end of all four platforms and a new entrance and concourse facing Turnmill Street. An additional ticket hall has been built on the south side of Cowcross Street providing access to the Thameslink platforms, which have been extended southwards underneath this building, allowing the station to handle 240 m (12-carriage) trains. Platforms have been widened to accommodate increased passenger numbers. This process required the bridge that formed Cowcross Street to be demolished and rebuilt. Cowcross Street is now pedestrianised. Lifts have been provided throughout.

The existing listed ticket hall and concourse have been remodelled, for use by London Underground and Thameslink passengers. Interchange within the station has been improved by removing the interchange bridge and installing new stairs and lifts with access to all four platforms, allowing passengers with impaired mobility to use the station.

It was necessary to build the Thameslink platform extensions to the south, since there is a sharp gradient to the immediate north of the station. This resulted in the two-station branch to Moorgate being permanently closed. The platform extensions cross the former Moorgate line and reach within a few metres of the entrance of the Snow Hill Tunnel. The alternative of realigning both the Thameslink and Circle/Hammersmith & City/Metropolitan lines was impractical as the latter crosses over the former on a bridge almost immediately to the north of the station.

==== Elizabeth line ====
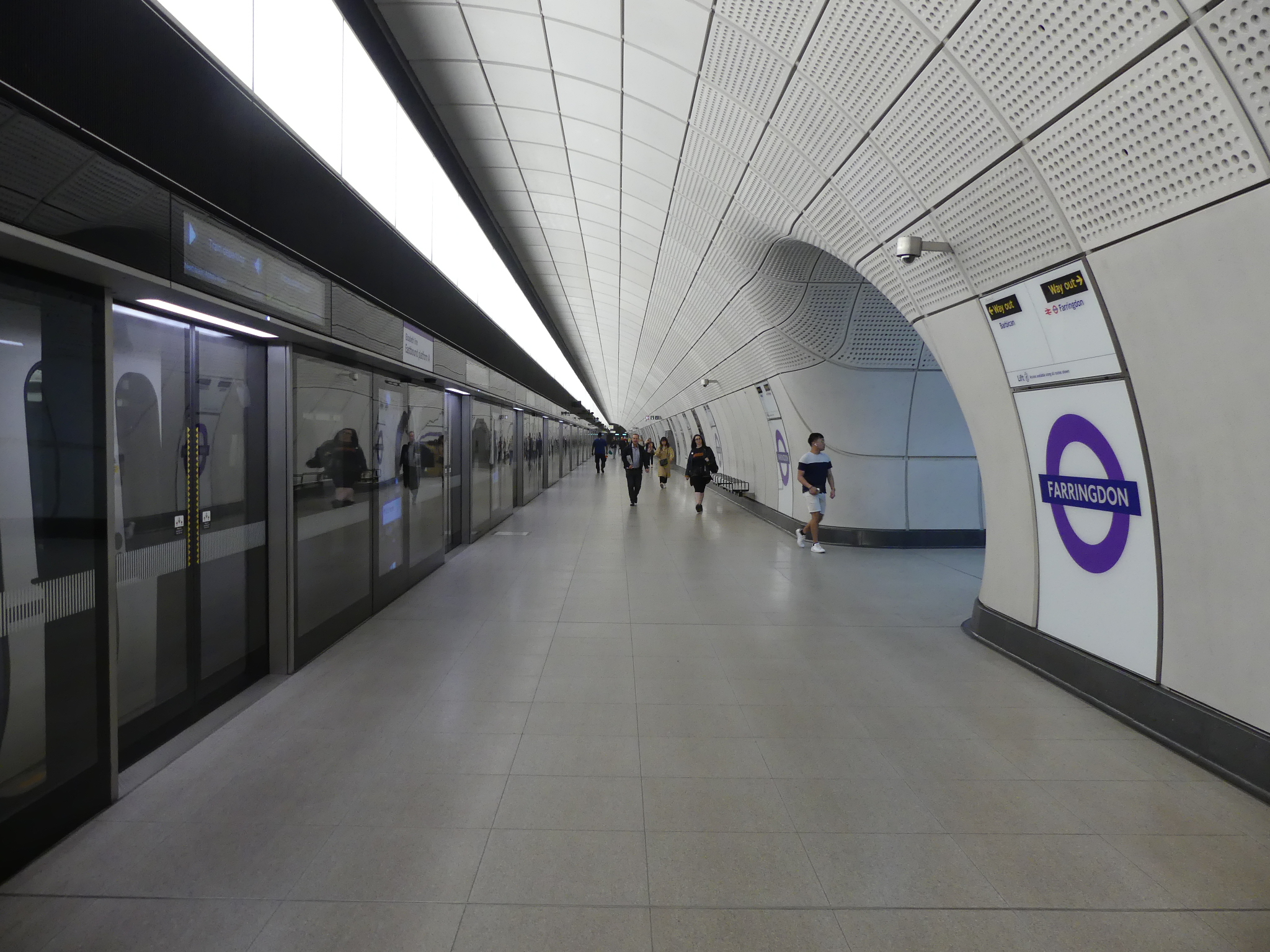
Eastbound Elizabeth line platform at Farringdon

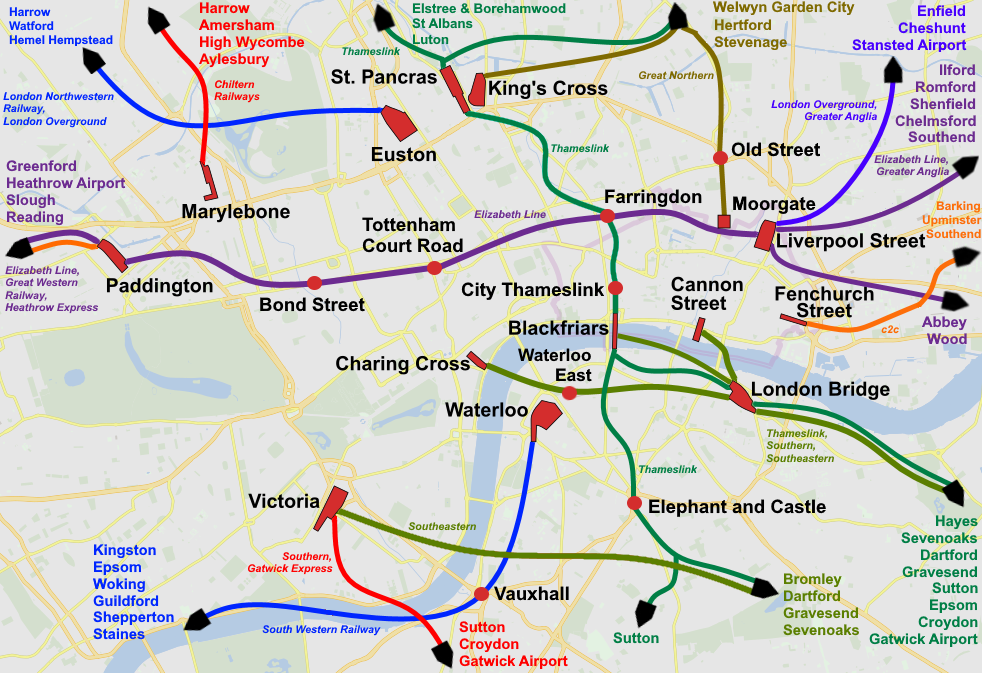
With the opening of the Elizabeth line, Farringdon became the interchange between the north–south Thameslink and the west–east Elizabeth line.

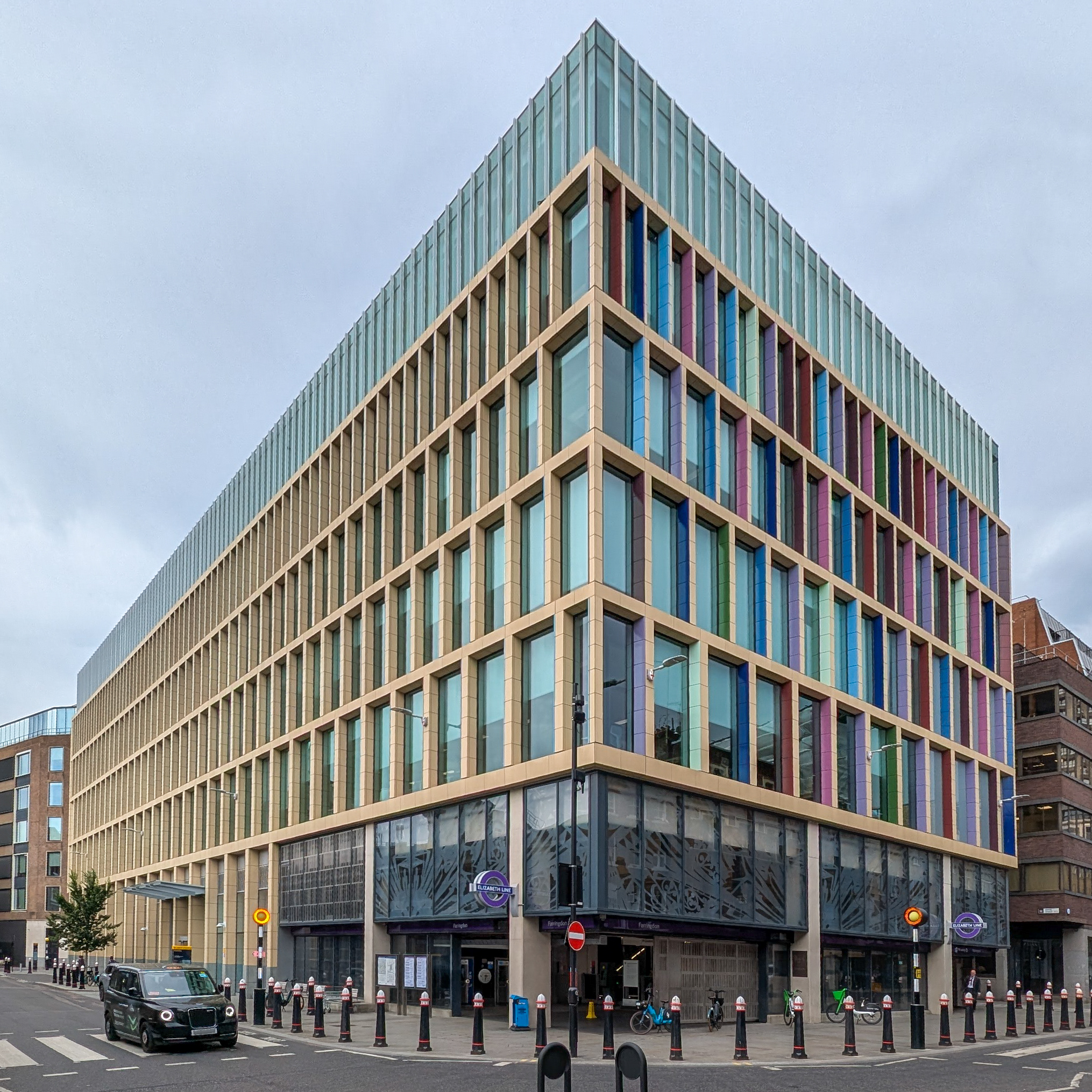
Additional Elizabeth line entrance at junction of Long Lane and Lindsey Street

The Farringdon Elizabeth line station was built as part of the Crossrail project. It lies between Farringdon and Barbican Underground stations and has interchanges with both of them. Access at the Farringdon end is via the new Thameslink ticket hall. Work was anticipated to be completed in 2018, but the scheduled opening date was delayed.

From 24 May 2022 the new railway line linked Farringdon to Abbey Wood via Canary Wharf in the east and Paddington, in the west. The station is also a hub for cross-London travel, being the only station to be on both the north-south Thameslink service and the east-west Elizabeth line service.

Direct Elizabeth line services between Reading/Heathrow in the west and Shenfield (via Whitechapel and Stratford) started in late 2022.

== Dual traction current supply ==
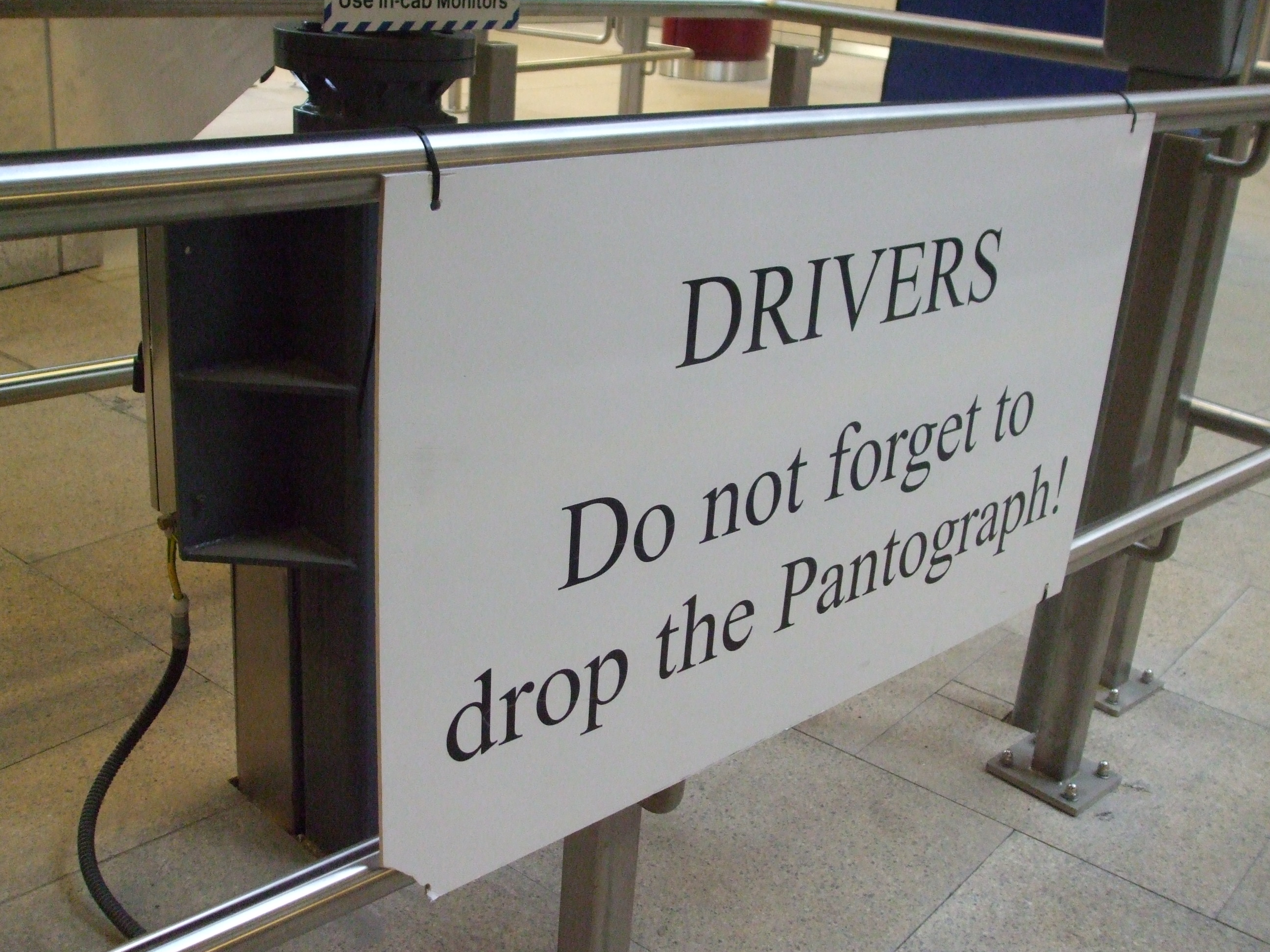
Warning to train drivers heading south from Farringdon

Thameslink trains switch between the 25 kV AC overhead supply used to the north of London and the 750 V DC third rail supply used to the south whilst standing at the platform. The trains that formerly ran to Moorgate used 25 kV AC throughout their journeys. This project was installed by the Network SouthEast sector of British Rail in May 1988.

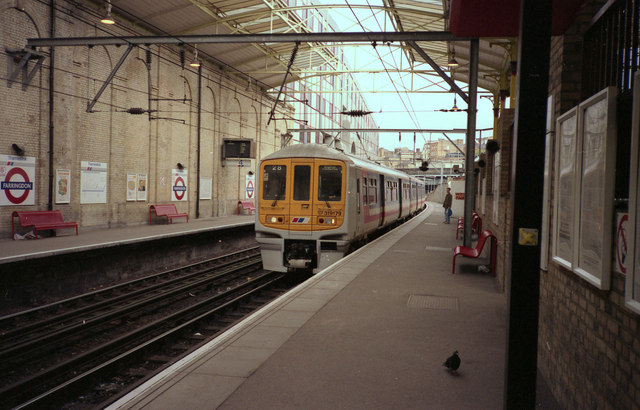
A Network SouthEast livery British Rail Class 319 in the station switching power supply in 1991

Until the start of the Thameslink Programme southbound trains that were unable to switch to DC were taken out of service at Farringdon and stabled at Moorgate to prevent them from blocking the core section of the Thameslink route. As this option is no longer possible the catenary has been extended to City Thameslink to enable these trains to continue to the southbound platform at City Thameslink using AC and then return northwards using the new crossover in Snow Hill Tunnel. The pantograph on southbound trains is normally lowered at Farringdon.

Underground trains serving Farringdon use the four-rail 630 V DC system.

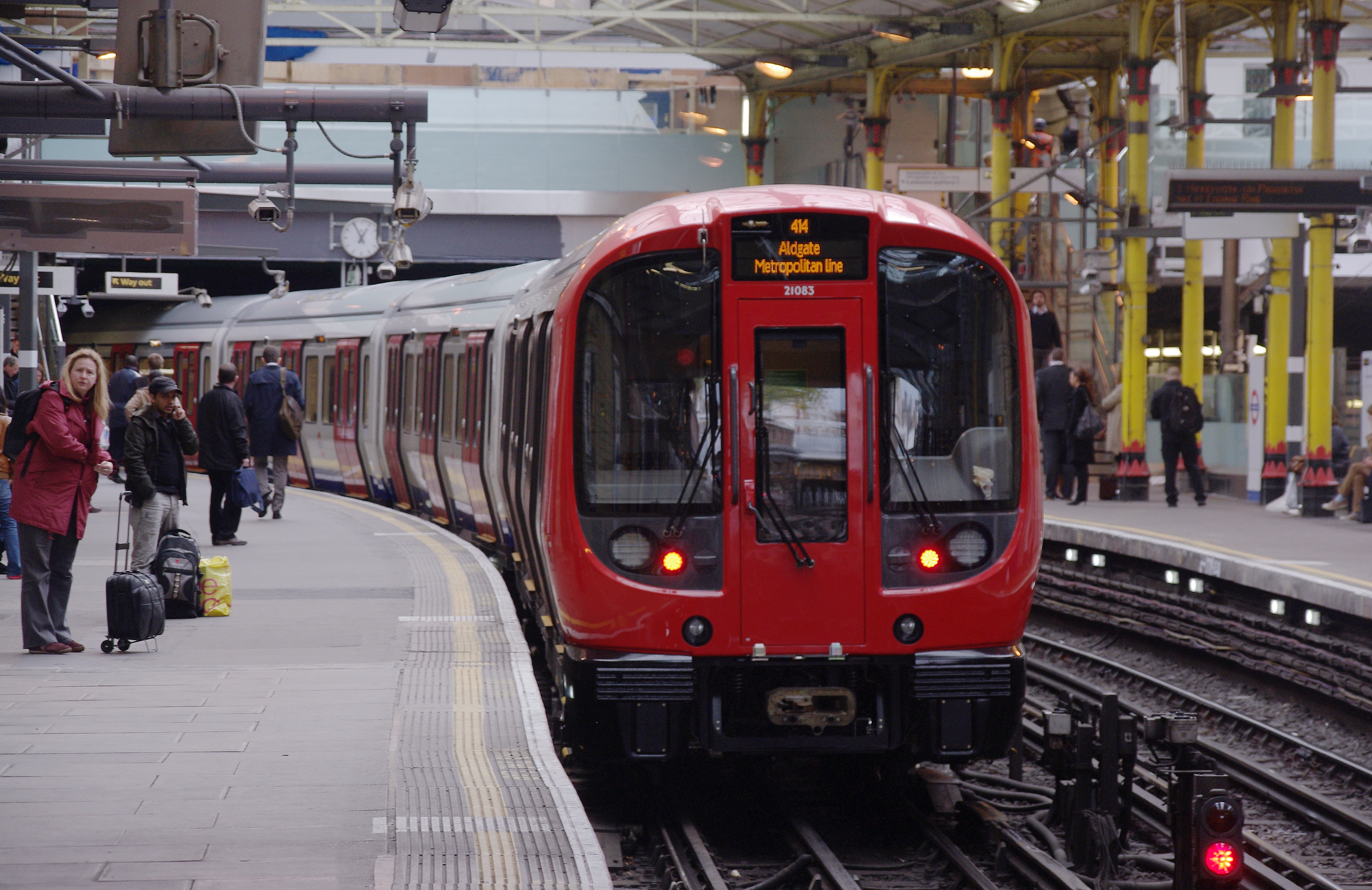
A Metropolitan line S Stock train departing Platform 1 with an Eastbound service to Aldgate

== Artwork ==
On the London Underground concourse, a memorial to Edward Johnston (the creator of the eponymous London Underground typeface) was designed by Fraser Muggeridge. Consisting of the letters of the alphabet in wood type set in Johnston, the memorial was unveiled by Sir Peter Hendy in 2019.

As part of the Crossrail Art Programme, two artworks were commissioned from British artist Simon Periton. At the eastern entrance, the exterior glass of the station is printed with patterns echoing the Victorian ironmongery of the Smithfield Market located opposite the station entrance. At the western entrance, the glazing alongside the escalators are printed with giant diamonds, referencing the jewellers located nearby in Hatton Garden.

== Accidents and incidents ==
- On 5 January 1867, 16 people were injured at Farringdon Street station in a rear-end collision caused by a signaller's error.
- On 5 January 1892, a defective axlebox resulted in the derailment of part of a train shortly after it had departed Farringdon Street. Five passengers were injured.
- On 26 November 1907, a train in the process of departing Farringdon Street was rear-ended by a second train entering the station.
- On 1 May 1939, a total of 31 people were injured when a Circle line train was involved in a minor collision with a railway engine. Seventeen passengers reported they had suffered shock and injury while a further nine subsequently complained that they had incurred minor injuries. Five crew members were also injured.
- On 22 May 1954, three people in a lorry were killed when it fell from a bridge on to the tracks near Farringdon. A goods train collided with the lorry shortly after departing Farringdon.
- On 30 April 2026, fourteen people received medical treatment, with two hospitalised, after a "chemical smell" on an Elizabeth line platform.

== Services ==
=== London Underground ===
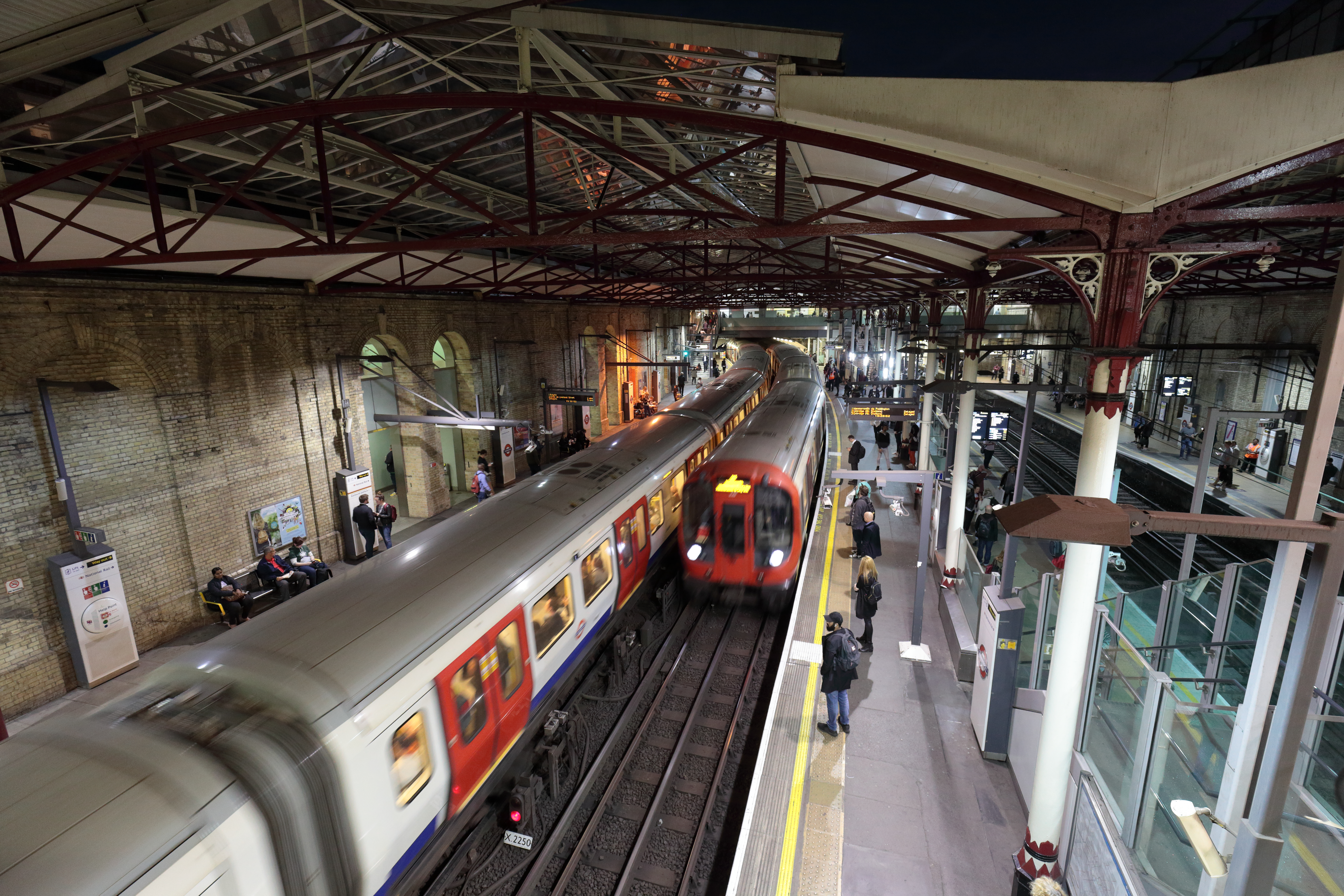
Underground trains at Farringdon Station

The London Underground part of the station is directly next to the Thameslink platforms and is served by the Circle, Hammersmith & City and Metropolitan lines, between King's Cross St Pancras to the west and Barbican to the east. All three lines share the same pair of tracks from Baker Street Junction to Aldgate North Junction making this section of track one of the most intensely used on the London Underground network.

==== Circle line ====
The typical service in trains per hour (tph) is:

- 6 tph Clockwise via Liverpool Street and Tower Hill
- 6 tph To Hammersmith via King's Cross St Pancras and Paddington

==== Hammersmith & City line ====
The typical service in trains per hour (tph) is:

- 6 tph Eastbound to Barking
- 6 tph Westbound to Hammersmith via Paddington

==== Metropolitan line ====
The Metropolitan line is the only line to operate express services, though this is only during peak times (Eastbound 06:30–09:30 / Westbound 16:00–19:00). Fast services run non-stop between Wembley Park, Harrow-on-the-Hill and Moor Park. Semi-fast services run non-stop between Wembley Park and Harrow-on-the-Hill.

The typical off-peak service in trains per hour (tph) is:

- 12 tph Eastbound to Aldgate
- 2 tph Westbound to Amersham (all stations)
- 2 tph Westbound to Chesham (all stations)
- 8 tph Westbound to Uxbridge (all stations)

Off-peak services to/from Watford terminate at Baker Street

The typical peak time service in trains per hour (tph) is:

- 14 tph Eastbound to Aldgate
- 2 tph Westbound to Amersham (fast in the evening peak only)
- 2 tph Westbound to Chesham (fast in the evening peak only)
- 4 tph Westbound to Watford (semi-fast in the evening peak only)
- 6 tph Westbound to Uxbridge (all stations)

Farringdon is in London fare zone 1.

=== Thameslink ===
All Thameslink services at Farringdon serve between St Pancras International and City Thameslink using part of the City Widened Lines and Snow Hill Tunnel respectively. Services are operated using Class 700 EMUs.

The typical off-peak service in trains per hour is:

- 4 tph to Brighton via Gatwick Airport
- 2 tph to Horsham via Redhill and Gatwick Airport
- 2 tph to Three Bridges via Redhill
- 2 tph to Rainham via Greenwich, Woolwich Arsenal, Dartford and Gravesend
- 4 tph to Sutton (2 of these run via Mitcham Junction and 2 run via Wimbledon)
- 4 tph to St Albans City (all stations)
- 2 tph to Luton (all stations except Kentish Town, Cricklewood and Hendon)
- 4 tph to Bedford (semi-fast)
- 2 tph to Cambridge via Stevenage
- 2 tph to Peterborough via Stevenage

The station is also served by a half-hourly night service between Bedford and Three Bridges.

Prior to 2009, Thameslink services also ran to Moorgate via Barbican with trains diverging from the core route east of the platforms at Farringdon. This section of line was closed as part of the Thameslink Programme which involved the construction of a new ticket hall and the lengthening of platforms at Farringdon to enable platform extensions to accommodate longer 12 carriage trains which covered over the junction in the process.

Farringdon is in London fare zone 1.

=== Elizabeth line ===
Elizabeth line services began calling at Farringdon on 24 May 2022 and all services are operated using Class 345 EMUs.

The typical off-peak service in trains per hour is:

- 8 tph to Abbey Wood
- 8 tph to Shenfield
- 6 tph to London Paddington
- 4 tph to Heathrow Terminal 4
- 2 tph to Heathrow Terminal 5
- 2 tph to Maidenhead
- 2 tph to Reading

These services combine to give a service of 16 tph in each direction. During the peak hours, the service is increased to 20 tph in each direction.

On Sundays, the services between Shenfield and London Paddington are reduced to 4 tph, with another 4 tph terminating instead at Gidea Park.

Preceding station	London Underground	Following station
King's Cross St Pancras towards Hammersmith	Circle line	Barbican towards Edgware Road via Aldgate
King's Cross St Pancras towards Hammersmith	Hammersmith & City line	Barbican towards Barking
King's Cross St Pancras towards Uxbridge, Amersham, Chesham or Watford	Metropolitan line	Barbican towards Aldgate
Preceding station	National Rail	Following station
St Pancras International	Thameslink Thameslink	City Thameslink
Preceding station	Elizabeth line	Following station
Tottenham Court Road towards Reading or Heathrow Airport Terminal 4 or Terminal 5	Elizabeth line	Liverpool Street towards Abbey Wood or Shenfield
Former services
Preceding station	London Underground	Following station
King's Cross St Pancras towards Hammersmith	Metropolitan line Hammersmith branch (1864–1990)	Barbican towards Barking
Abandoned plans
Preceding station	London Underground	Following station
Clerkenwell towards Hammersmith, Kensington (Addison Road), Uxbridge, Chesham, Verney Junction or Brill	Metropolitan Railway	Aldersgate; Whitechapel
Disused railways
Preceding station	National Rail	Following station
King's Cross Thameslink (before December 2007); St. Pancras International (December 2007 – March 2009)	First Capital Connect; City Widened Lines	Barbican
King's Cross Metropolitan or King's Cross York Road	British Rail; Eastern Region; City Widened Lines	Barbican

== Connections ==
London Buses day and night routes serve the station.
