= Barbican tube station =

London Underground station

Barbican
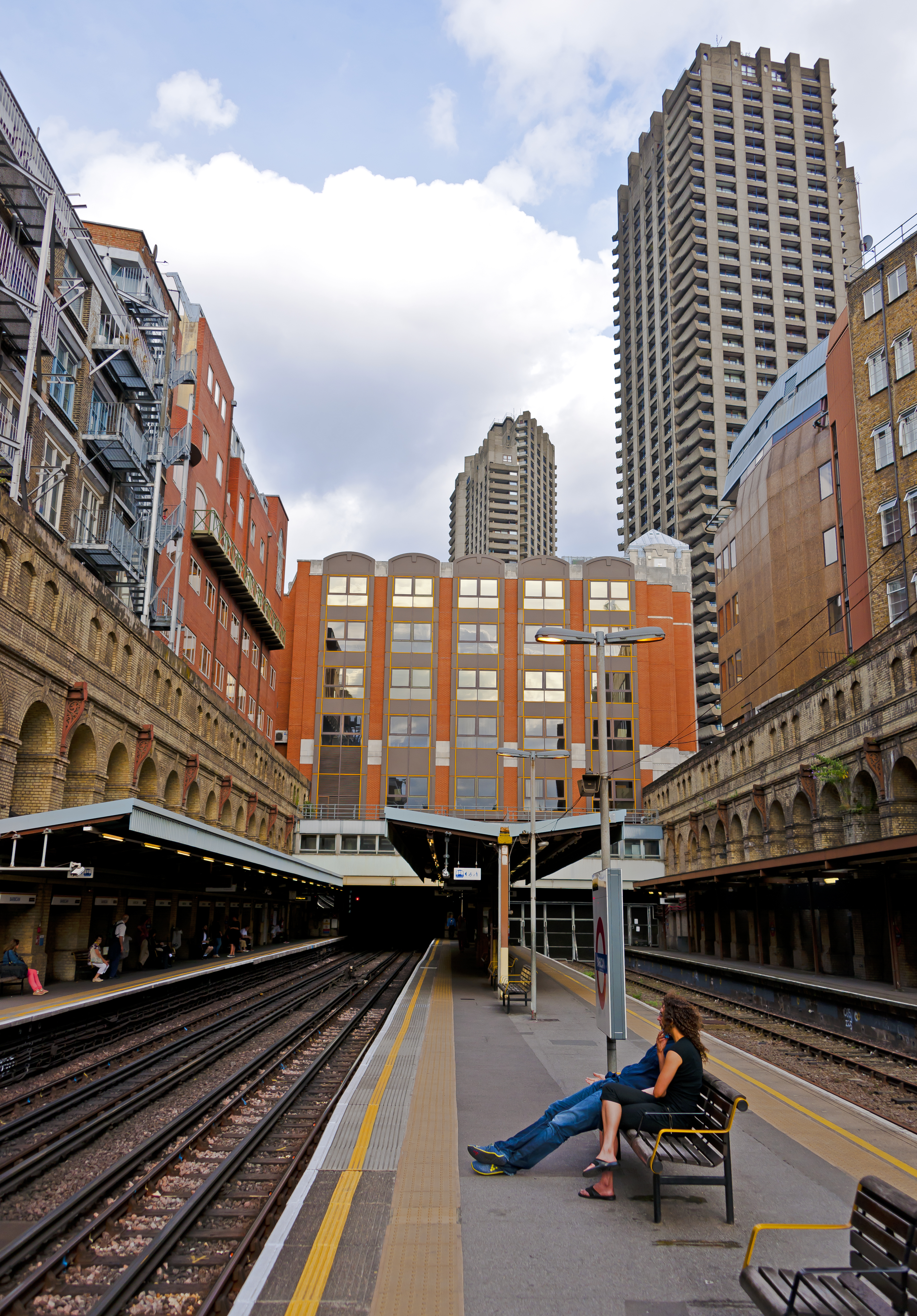
- View of Barbican station platforms, with the Barbican Estate towers in the background, 2014
- Interactive map of Barbican

General information
- Location: Barbican
- Local authority: City of London
- Managed by: London Underground
- Number of platforms: 4 (2 in use)
- Fare zone: 1

London Underground annual entry and exit
- 2021: ▲3.47 million
- 2022: ▲5.36 million
- 2023: ▼5.19 million
- 2024: ▼5.15 million
- 2025: ▲5.34 million

Key dates
- 23 December 1865: Opened as Aldersgate Street
- 1 November 1910: Renamed Aldersgate
- 24 October 1924: Renamed Aldersgate & Barbican
- 1 December 1968: Renamed Barbican
- 1976: Services from Great Northern line via Widened Lines ceased
- 1982: Electrified services from Bedford commenced
- 2009: Thameslink services ceased
- 24 May 2022: Opened access to Farringdon (Elizabeth line)

Other information
- External links: TfL station info page
- Coordinates: 51.5202°N 0.0977°W

Barbican is a London Underground station situated near the Barbican Estate, on the edge of the ward of Farringdon Within, City of London. It has been known by various names since its opening in 1865, mostly in reference to the neighbouring ward of Aldersgate.

The station is on the Circle, Hammersmith & City and Metropolitan lines, between Farringdon and Moorgate stations. It is in London fare zone 1. Platform 2, serving westbound trains, is connected by a single lift to Farringdon station on the Elizabeth line. Until 2009, Barbican was additionally served by Thameslink services to and from Moorgate.

== Location ==
Barbican station lies in an east–west-aligned cutting with cut-and-cover tunnels at either end. The modern entrance gives access from Aldersgate Street, through a 1990s building, to a much older footbridge leading to the eastern end of the platforms. (Note: Aldersgate Street is where the station has always stood. The street itself took its name from Aldersgate, a gate in the old London Wall.) To the north of the station are the backs of buildings which face onto Charterhouse Street, Charterhouse Square and Carthusian Street. To the south are the backs of buildings which face onto Long Lane, and to the west is Hayne Street. The station is close to the Barbican Estate, Barbican Centre, City of London School for Girls, St Bartholomew-the-Great, and Smithfield. The Eastern Ticket Hall entrance to Farringdon Elizabeth line station is one street west of the station entrance, on the corner of Long Lane and Lindsey Street. A single lift connects directly from the Elizabeth line onto the westbound platform at Barbican.

== History ==
The station was opened with the name Aldersgate Street on 23 December 1865 on the Moorgate extension from Farringdon. It was built on the site of an earlier building at 134 Aldersgate Street, which for many years had a sign claiming "This was Shakespeare's House". The building was very close to the nearby Fortune Playhouse, and a subsidy roll from 1598 shows a "William Shakespeare" as the owner of the property, however, there is no documentary evidence indicating they and the playwright were the same person.

The station, which has no surface building, had its name shortened to Aldersgate on 1 November 1910 and was renamed again on 24 October 1924 as Aldersgate & Barbican, although tube maps and London A to Zs continued to show it as Aldersgate. On 1 December 1968 the station's name was simplified to Barbican.

Train services were disrupted during the Second World War when the station suffered severe bomb damage during the Blitz, particularly in December 1940. This led to the removal of the upper floors, and in 1955 the remainder of the street-level building was also demolished and the glass roof was replaced with awnings. This urged John Betjeman to write his poem Monody on the Death of Aldersgate Station.

Increasing traffic by other companies, including goods traffic, led to the track between King's Cross and Moorgate being widened to four tracks in 1868; the route was called the 'City Widened Lines'. Suburban services from the Midland Railway ran via Kentish Town and the Great Northern Railway ran via Kings Cross. British Rail services to Moorgate were initially steam operated before being converted to Cravens-built diesel multiple units and British Rail Class 31 locomotives class hauling non-corridor stock which remained in operation until the mid-1970s.

Passenger trains from the Great Northern line, via the York Road and Hotel curves at King's Cross to the Widened Lines, ran until the Great Northern's electrification in 1976. The City Widened Lines were renamed the Moorgate line when overhead electrification was installed in 1982, allowing the Midland City Line service to run from Bedford via the Midland Main Line to Moorgate on the Thameslink service. The Thameslink platforms at Barbican were closed again in March 2009 as part of the Thameslink Programme to allow Farringdon to have its main line platforms extended across Thameslink's Moorgate branch. As a result, Barbican now serves Underground lines only.

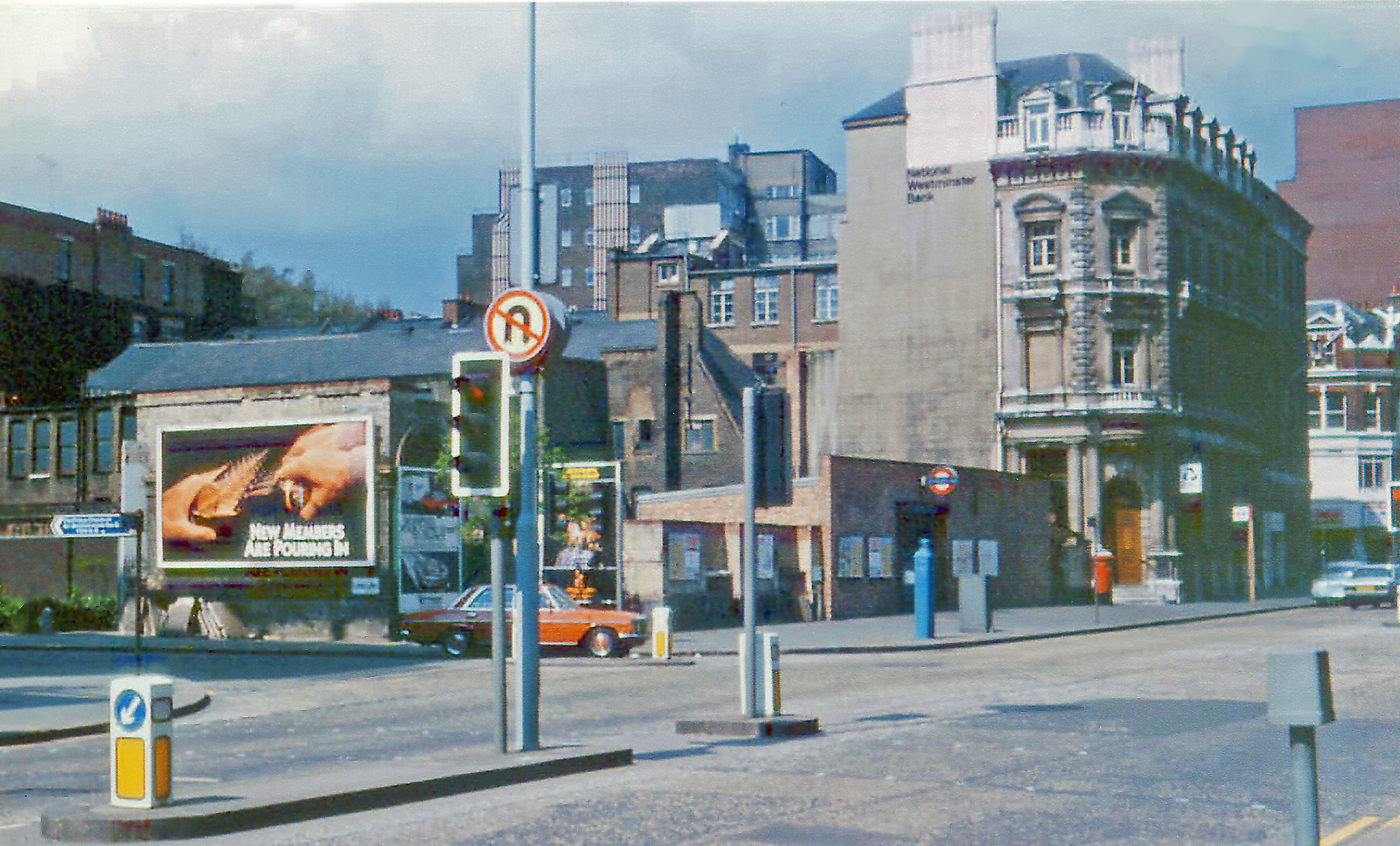
The old entrance in 1981

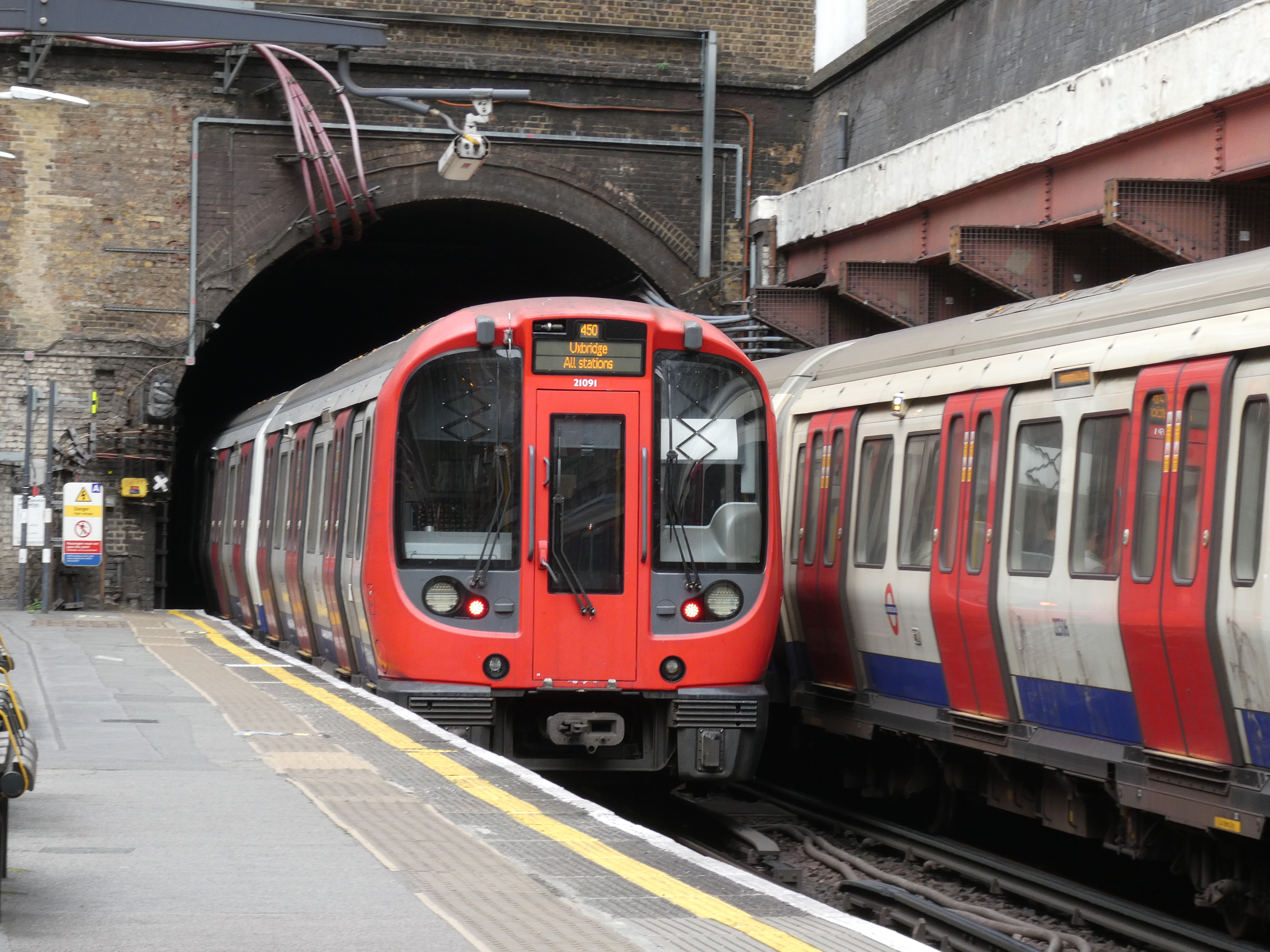
Metropolitan line S8 Stock departing the station in 2025

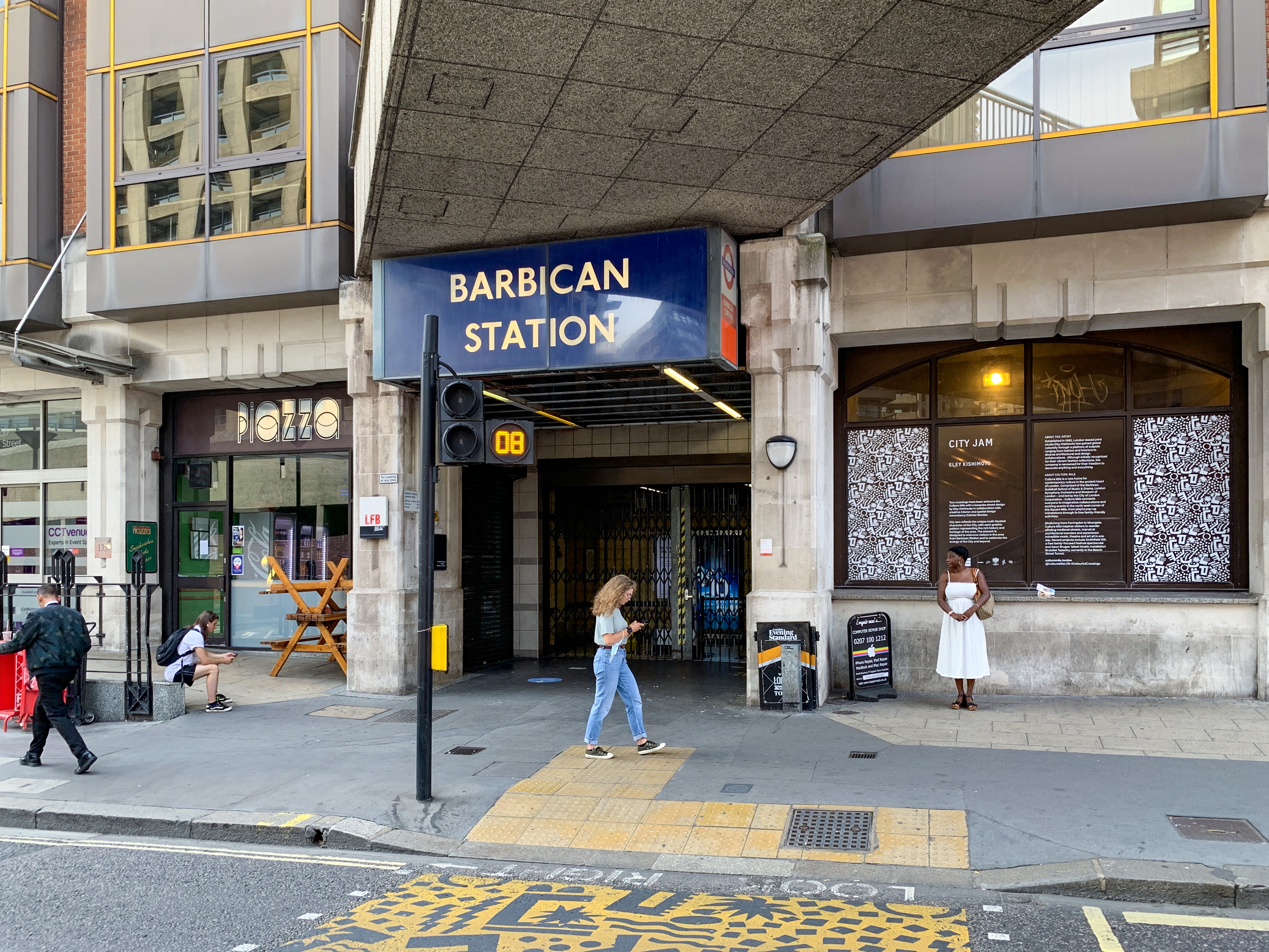
Modern entrance to Barbican

The modern station is mostly open to the elements, though there are some short canopies. The remains of the supporting structure for a glass canopy over all four platforms (removed in the 1950s) may still be seen. At the west end of the platforms may be seen the beginnings of the complex of tunnels leading under Smithfield meat market. Livestock for the market was at one time delivered by rail and there was a substantial goods yard under the site of the market.

Platform 1 is the most northerly, serving eastbound London Underground services. Platforms 2 and 3 form an island platform, with platform 2 serving westbound services.

Platform 2 contains a lift to the Elizabeth line platforms; it is the only platform with step-free access. Platforms 3 and 4 are out of use. A display on the history of the station, including text and photographs, is just inside the barriers, on the southern side of the main entrance corridor.

The station has a commemorative plaque affixed to one of its walls in memory of the station's deceased cat Pebbles.

== Incidents and accidents ==
On 16 December 1866, three passengers were killed, a guard was seriously injured, and one other person suffered shock when a girder collapsed onto a passenger train in the station. The accident was the first to include multiple passengers on the underground network. Four people died during the accident, and a fifth (a workman involved in the accident) died while awaiting trial. Service on the line was running again only 30 minutes afterwards.

On 26 April 1897, a bomb exploded under a seat in a first-class carriage in the station, injuring ten people of whom two died later. The perpetrators were never identified, but it was believed to have been part of a Fenian campaign following three other bombs in 1883–1885.

== Services ==
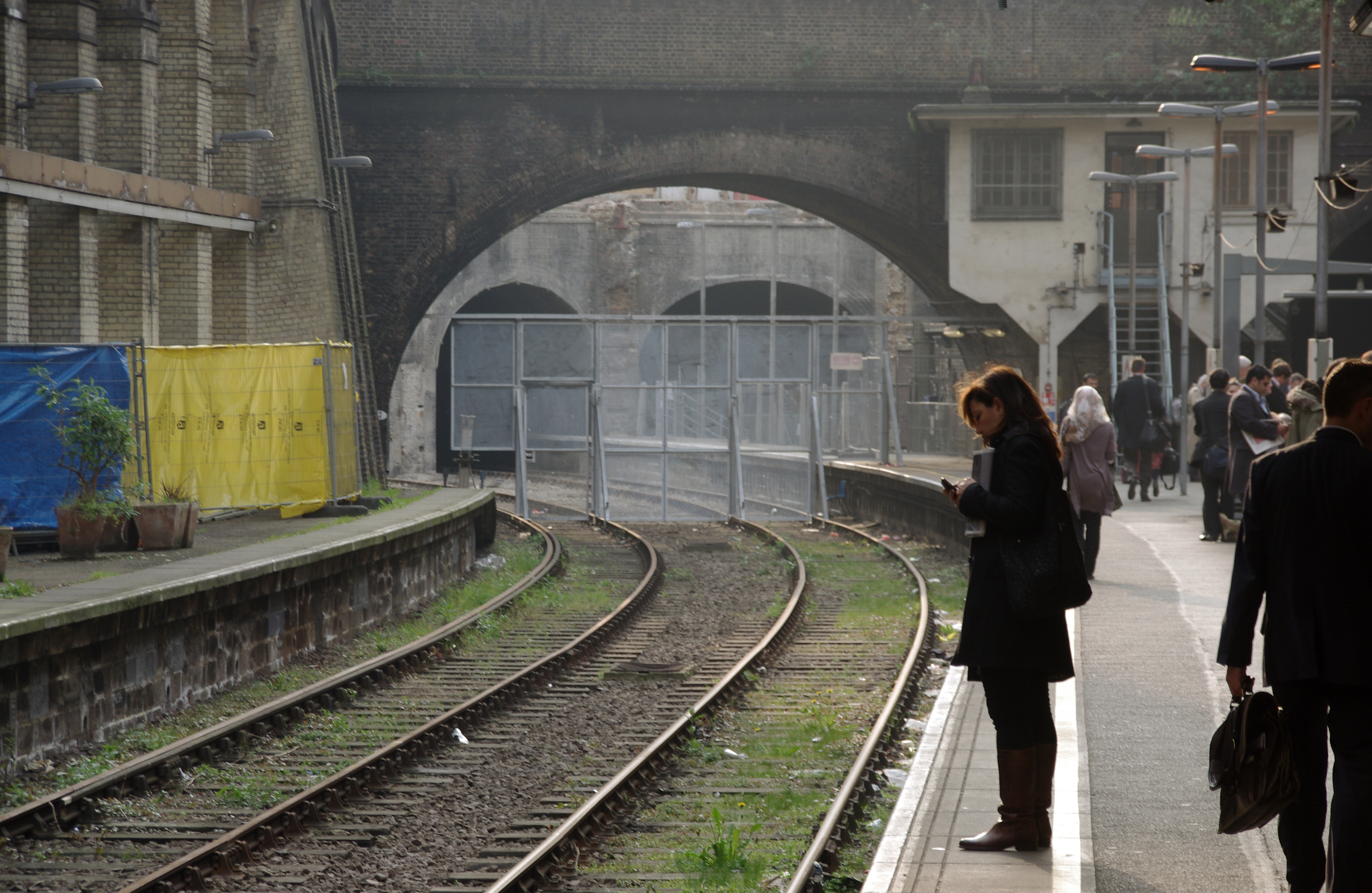
The Thameslink lines on the south side of the station are no longer in use. The signal box seen here (R) was demolished in January 2015 as part of the Crossrail redevelopment.

Barbican station is on the Circle, Hammersmith & City and Metropolitan lines in London fare zone 1. It is between Farringdon to the west and Moorgate to the east. All three lines share the same pair of tracks from Baker Street Junction to Aldgate Junction making this section of track one of the most intensely used on the London Underground network.

=== Circle line ===
The typical service in trains per hour (tph) is:

- 6 tph clockwise to Edgware Road via Liverpool Street and Victoria
- 6 tph anti-clockwise to Hammersmith via Kings Cross St Pancras and Paddington

=== Hammersmith & City line ===
The typical service in trains per hour (tph) is:

- 6 tph Eastbound to Barking
- 6 tph Westbound to Hammersmith via Paddington

=== Metropolitan line ===
The Metropolitan Line is the only line to operate express services, though currently this is only during peak times (Eastbound 06:30–09:30 / Westbound 16:00–19:00). Fast services run non-stop between Wembley Park, Harrow-on-the-Hill and Moor Park, Semi-fast services run non-stop between Wembley Park and Harrow-on-the-Hill.

The typical off-peak service in trains per hour (tph) is:

- 12 tph Eastbound to Aldgate
- 2 tph Westbound to Amersham (all stations)
- 2 tph Westbound to Chesham (all stations)
- 8 tph Westbound to Uxbridge (all stations)

Off-peak services to/from Watford terminate at Baker Street

The typical peak time service in trains per hour (tph) is:

- 14 tph Eastbound to Aldgate
- 2 tph Westbound to Amersham (fast in the evening peak only)
- 2 tph Westbound to Chesham (fast in the evening peak only)
- 4 tph Westbound to Watford (semi-fast in the evening peak only)
- 6 tph Westbound to Uxbridge (all stations)

=== Elizabeth line ===
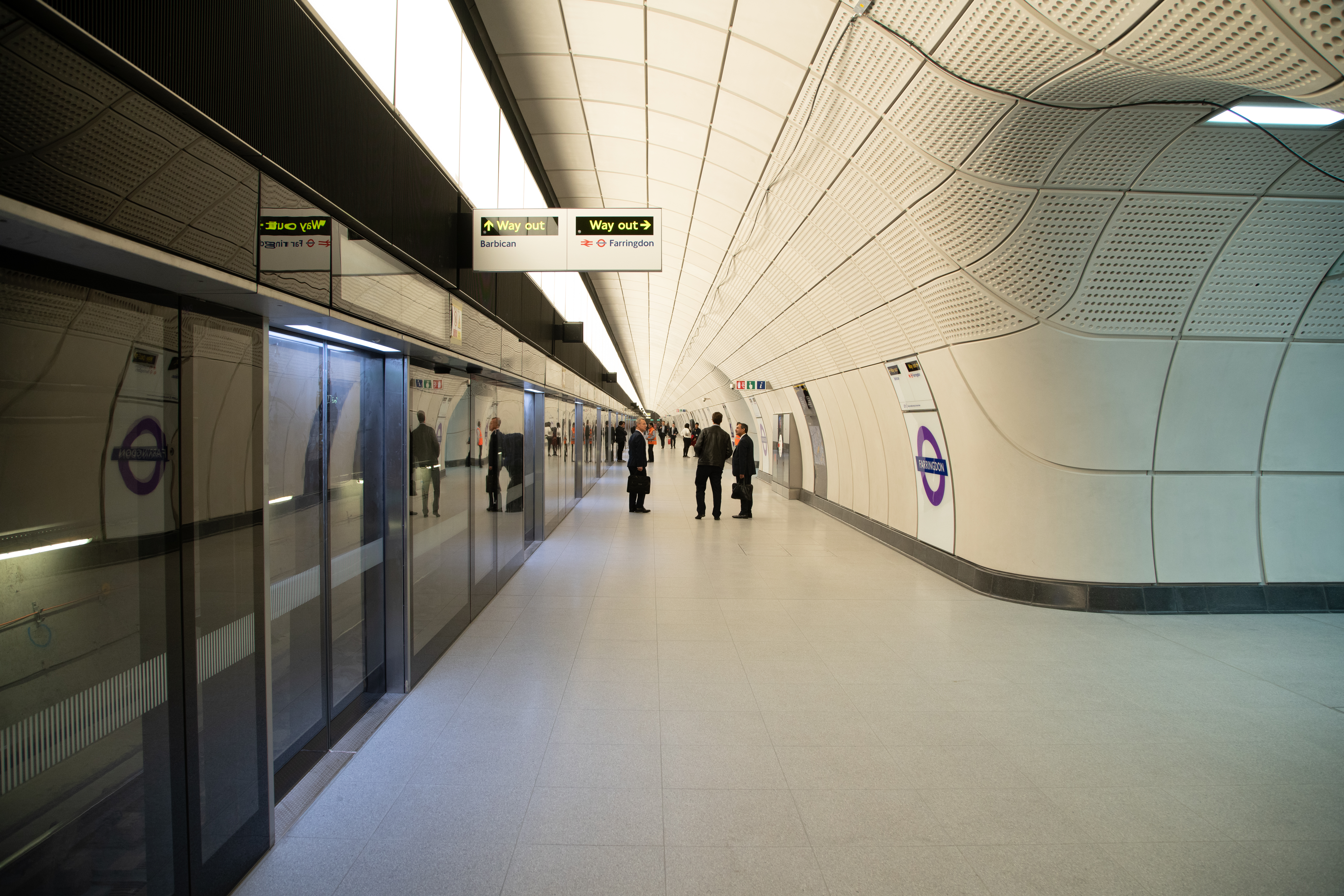
The Elizabeth line platforms at Farringdon are connected to Barbican's westbound platform.

Farringdon's Barbican ticket hall for the Elizabeth line is just to the west of Barbican station along Long Lane. This construction involved significant changes at the western end of the station, including the demolition of the former signal box to construct a lift shaft from the Elizabeth line station to the westbound Underground platform only. The original plan of a new footbridge spanning the tracks to the eastbound platform was not proceeded with on the grounds of engineering difficulties. Work was anticipated to be completed in 2018, but was completed in May 2022.

Preceding station	London Underground	Following station
Farringdon towards Hammersmith	Circle line	Moorgate towards Edgware Road via Aldgate
Farringdon towards Hammersmith	Hammersmith & City line	Moorgate towards Barking
Farringdon towards Uxbridge, Amersham, Chesham or Watford	Metropolitan line	Moorgate towards Aldgate
Internal connection
Preceding station	Elizabeth line	Following station
Tottenham Court Road towards Paddington	Elizabeth line transfer at Farringdon	Liverpool Street towards Abbey Wood
Former services
Preceding station	London Underground	Following station
Farringdon towards Hammersmith	Metropolitan line Hammersmith branch (1864–1990)	Moorgate towards Barking
Disused Railways
Preceding station	National Rail	Following station
Farringdon	First Capital Connect; City Widened Lines; Peak hours only	Moorgate
Farringdon	Great Northern Railway; Widened Lines	Moorgate

== Connections ==
London Buses routes serve the station.
