= Clerkenwell tube station =

Unbuilt London Underground station

Clerkenwell
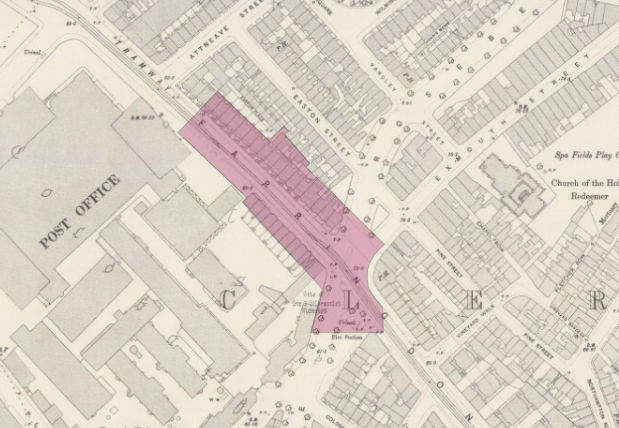
- Proposed location superimposed on Ordnance Survey map

- Location of Clerkenwell in Greater London
- Location: Clerkenwell
- Owner: Never built

Railway companies
- Original company: Metropolitan Railway

Other information
- Coordinates: 51.5254°N 0.1107°W

Clerkenwell was an authorised underground railway station planned by the Metropolitan Railway but never built. It was to be located on Farringdon Road at Mount Pleasant in Clerkenwell, London.

== History ==
The route of the Metropolitan Railway, 1863

The Metropolitan Railway (MR, now the Metropolitan line) opened in 1863 between Paddington and Farringdon as the world's first underground railway line. The railway was mostly constructed using cut and cover techniques under existing roads, though the section through Clerkenwell under Mount Pleasant hill was constructed using traditional tunnelling methods because of the depth of the tracks beneath the surface. Because of the depth, and the lack of development in the immediate area (until the 1880s the hill was the site of Coldbath Fields Prison), no station was constructed at Clerkenwell, leaving a greater distance between King's Cross (since replaced by King's Cross St Pancras further to the west) and Farringdon stations than between others on the railway.

In November 1910, the MR submitted a private bill to parliament that included plans to construct a new station at Mount Pleasant. The station would have been 60 feet (18 m) below ground. Parliamentary approval for the station was granted in the Metropolitan Railway Act 1911; however, the powers were not used and they lapsed in 1932.

== Bibliography ==
- Jackson, Alan (1986). London's Metropolitan Railway. David & Charles. ISBN 0-7153-8839-8.

Abandoned plans
Preceding station	London Underground	Following station
King's Cross towards Hammersmith, Addison Road, Uxbridge, Chesham or Verney Junction	Metropolitan Railway	Farringdon towards Aldgate, New Cross or New Cross Gate
King's Cross anticlockwise via Paddington	Inner Circle; Metropolitan & District Railways joint operation	Farringdon clockwise via Aldgate
