= Borough Road railway station =

Disused railway station in Newington, London

Borough Road
- Interactive map of Borough Road

General information
- Location: Newington
- Local authority: Southwark
- Grid reference: TQ320795
- Number of platforms: 4

Railway companies
- Original company: London, Chatham and Dover Railway

Key dates
- 1 June 1864: Opened
- 1 April 1907: Closed

Other information
- Coordinates: 51.4990°N 0.0997°W

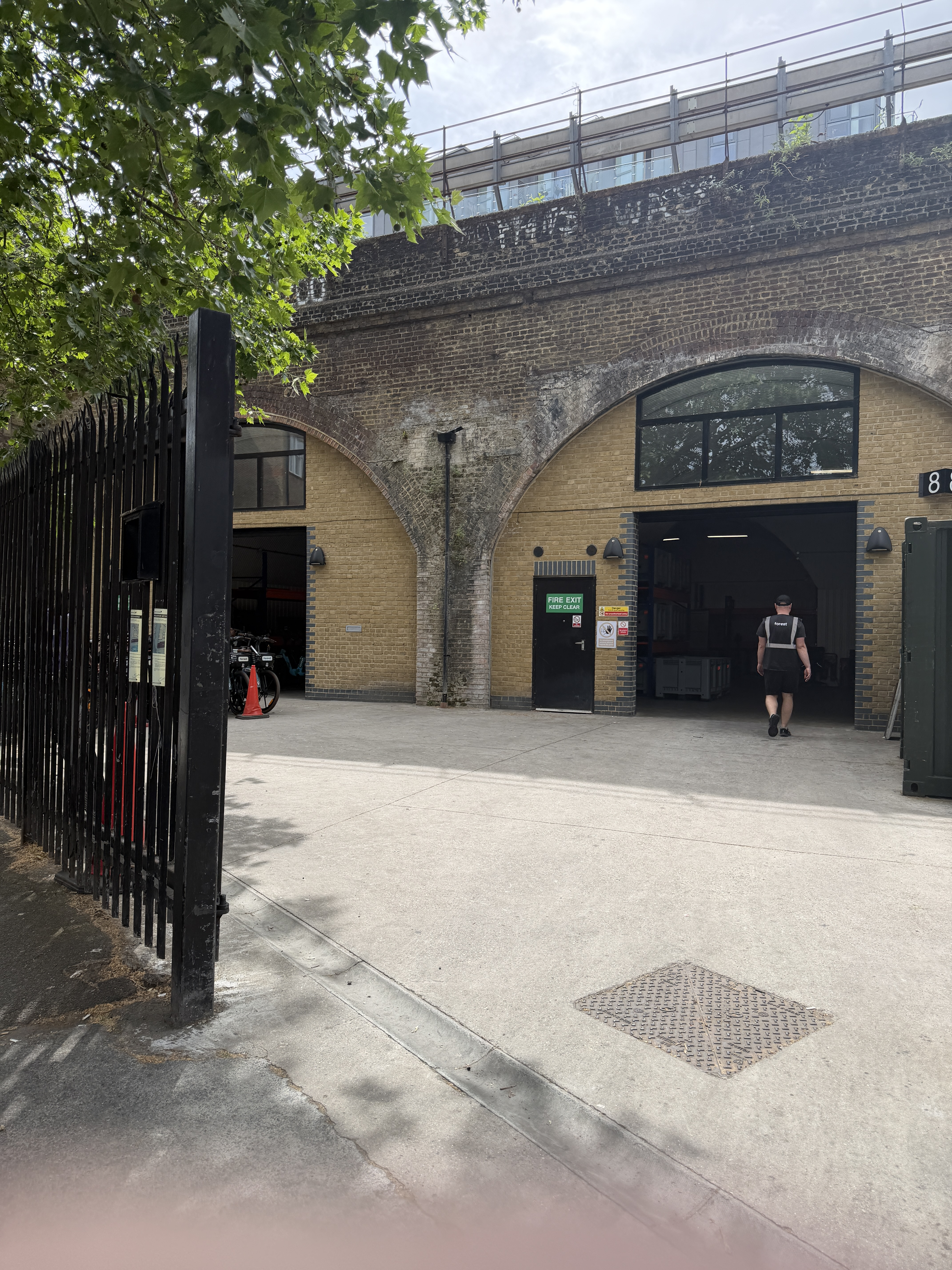

Borough Road was a mainline railway station in Southwark, south London, located on Borough Road, close to the location Borough Underground station.

== History ==
It was on the London, Chatham and Dover Railway (LCDR) and was first opened in June 1864 on the LCDR's City Branch. The line crossed the River Thames and ran up through St. Paul's (now Blackfriars) to terminate in the City of London.

From 1885, following the closure to passengers of Blackfriars Bridge station, Borough Road was the first stop out of central London for trains heading south from St. Paul's.

In 1879 the LCDR was running the following services that stopped at Borough Road:

- Frequent trains between Moorgate and Victoria, calling at all stations (Note: Trains called at Moorgate Street, Aldersgate Street, Snow Hill, Ludgate Hill, Blackfriars, Borough Road, Elephant and Castle, Walworth Road, Camberwell, Loughborough Junction, Brixton and South Stockwell, Clapham and North Stockwell, Wandsworth Road, Battersea Park Road, Grosvenor Road and Victoria)
- Half-hourly trains between Moorgate and Clapham Junction, calling at all stations (Note: Trains ran as for the Moorgate to Victoria service, calling only at Clapham Junction after Wandsworth Road.)
- Through trains from Kentish Town to Victoria, calling at all stations (Note: Trains called at Kentish Town, King's Cross (York Road), King's Cross (Metropolitan), Farringdon Street, Snow Hill then as for the Moorgate to Victoria service.)

Ultimately, Borough Road was an early victim of competition from the City & South London Railway's Borough station opened nearby in 1890. Passenger numbers dwindled and Borough Road closed in April 1907, at which time it was owned by the South Eastern and Chatham Railway. Although there is no trace of the platforms, the former entrance to the station still exists below the Southwark Bridge Road viaduct. In 1916, two other stations on the line to the south, Walworth Road and Camberwell, were also closed. Today, main line trains run straight through from Blackfriars to either Loughborough Junction or Denmark Hill, stopping only at Elephant & Castle.

== Notes ==
| Preceding station | Historical railways | Following station |
|---|---|---|
| Blackfriars Bridge; Line open, station closed | London, Chatham & Dover Railway; City Branch (1864-1885) | Elephant & Castle; Line and station open |
| Blackfriars; Line and station open | London, Chatham & Dover Railway; City Branch (1885-1907) | Elephant & Castle; Line and station open |
