= Holborn Viaduct–Herne Hill line =

Railway line in London, England

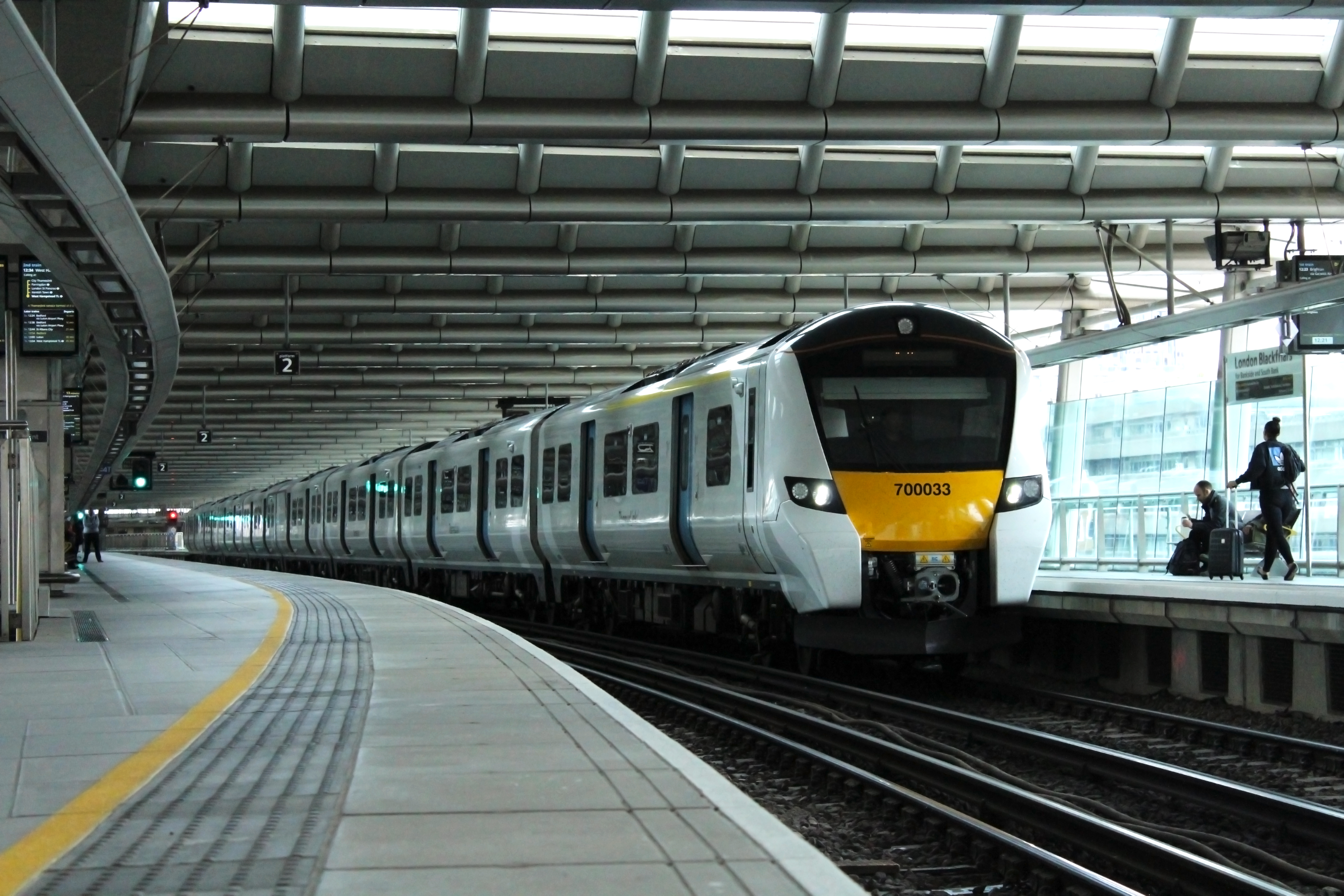
- A Class 700 unit at Blackfriars

Overview
- Status: Operational
- Owner: Network Rail
- ELR: HHH
- Locale: Greater London
- Termini: Holborn Viaduct (closed); Herne Hill

Service
- Services: Thameslink; Southeastern (peak only)
- Operator(s): Govia Thameslink Railway; Southeastern

History
- Opened: 6 October 1863
- Last extension: 1874

Technical
- Number of tracks: 2; 4 (Blackfriars–Loughborough Junction)
- Track gauge: 4 ft 8 1/2 in (1,435 mm) standard gauge
- Electrification: 750 V DC third rail

The Holborn Viaduct–Herne Hill line is a railway line between Holborn Viaduct in the City of London and Herne Hill in the London Borough of Lambeth. After the closure of Holborn Viaduct station the line ends at the south portal of Snow Hill tunnel merging into Snow Hill lines. From there the Widened Lines to St Pancras and Kentish Town are reached. Today the section north of Blackfriars is part of the Thameslink core. Originally being a branch line of the London, Chatham and Dover Railway (LCDR) towards the City of London, the line is sometimes called LCDR City Branch.

== History ==
In the late 1850s, the East Kent Railway had ambitions to run passenger trains between Kent and London, but it did not own any railway lines in inner London. It reached an agreement with the London, Brighton and South Coast Railway (LB&SCR) in 1858 to use the Crystal Palace line originally built by the West End of London and Crystal Palace Railway from Beckenham Junction to Clapham Junction to access Battersea and (from 1860) Victoria. This arrangement incurred costly access fees, but it was necessary until the company obtained parliamentary authority to build in London.

=== Construction ===
On 6 August 1860, the London, Chatham and Dover Railway (Metropolitan Extensions) Act 1860 (23 & 24 Vict. c. clxxvii) granted the London, Chatham and Dover Railway (LCDR; the successor to the East Kent Railway Company) the powers to extend the Chatham Main Line from Beckenham Junction to Battersea and to build a branch line from Herne Hill to the City of London.

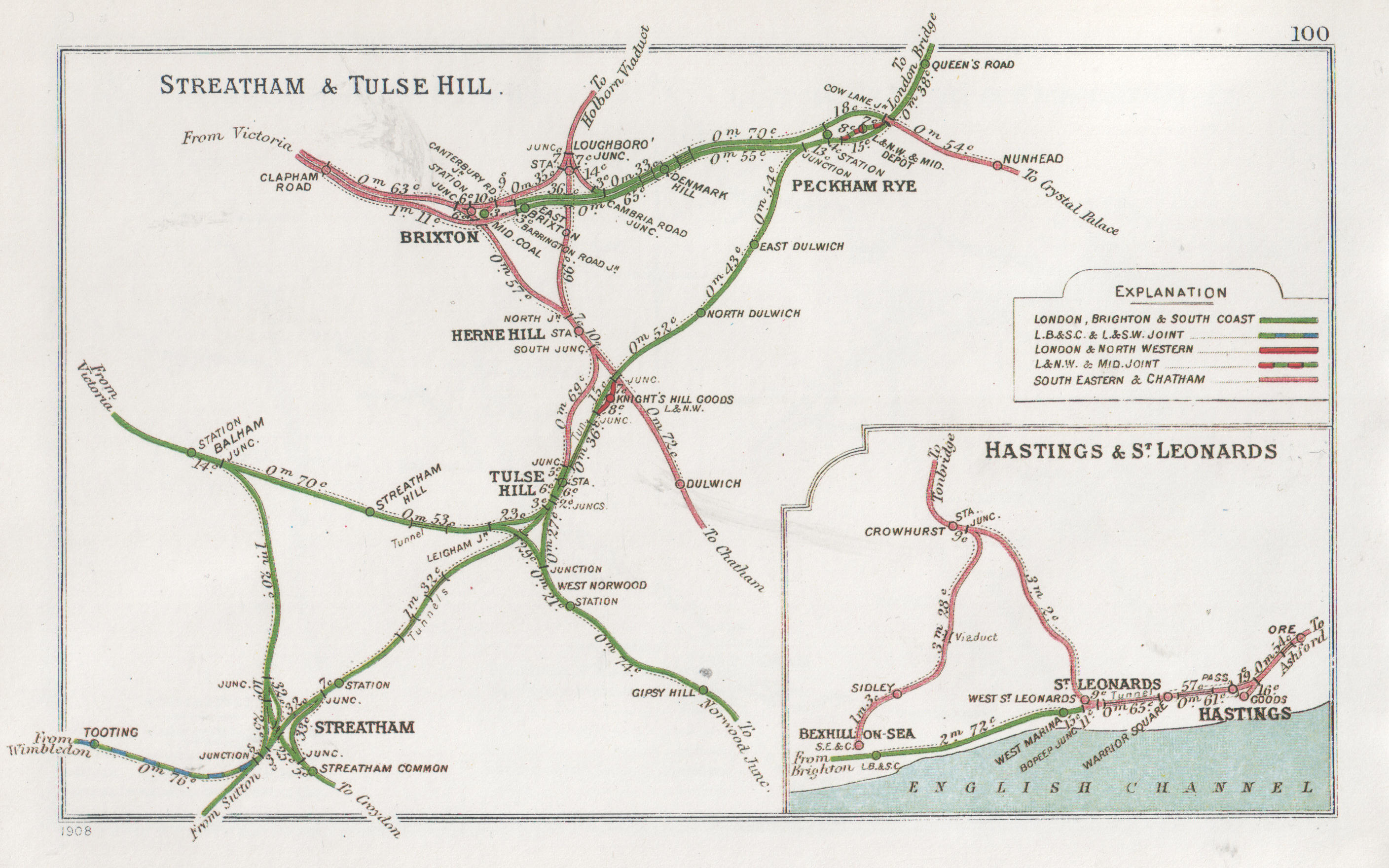
A 1914 Railway Clearing House map of lines around Herne Hill

After the main extension was built, the City Branch opened on 6 October 1863 from Herne Hill as far as Elephant & Castle, via Camberwell and Walworth Road. On 1 June 1864, the line had been extended to Blackfriars Bridge railway station (on the south bank of the River Thames) via Borough Road. Blackfriars Railway Bridge was then built across the Thames and a terminus for trains from the south opened at Ludgate Hill on 1 June 1865 (closed 3 March 1929).

=== Extensions ===
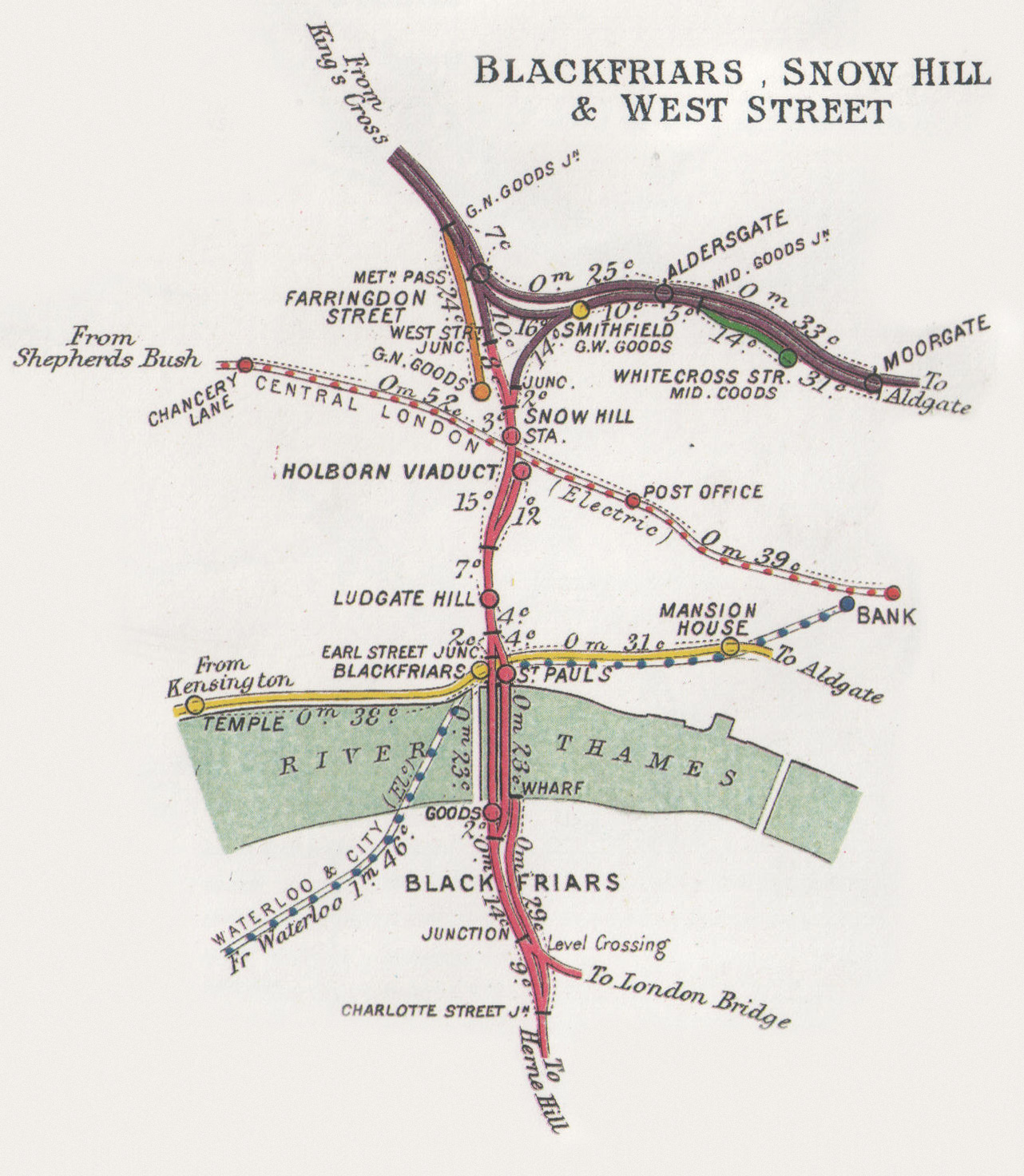
A 1914 Railway Clearing House map of lines around Holborn Viaduct

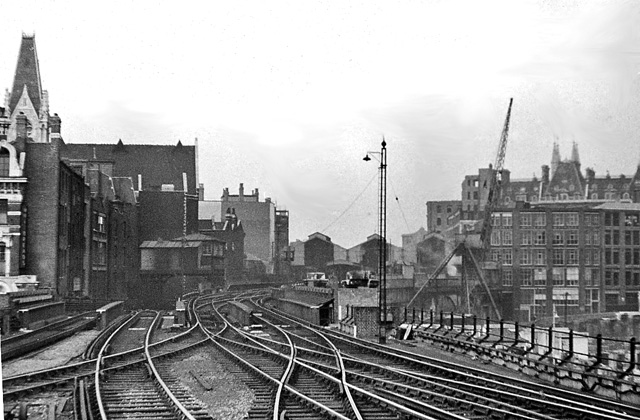
Original junction between the Holborn Viaduct–Herne Hill line (continuing on the right) and Snow Hill line (left) in 1953. The new transition between the lines lies 100 m south at the new portal of Snow Hill tunnel.

Snow Hill tunnel opened on 1 January 1866, enabling trains from Ludgate Hill to reach the Widened Lines at Farringdon. LCDR and Great Northern Railway (GNR) joint services from Blackfriars Bridge began operating via Snow Hill tunnel under Smithfield market to Farringdon and northwards on to the GNR.

Later that year, the LCDR completed work to widen the railway viaduct between Herne Hill and Blackfriars Bridge, which included doubling the number of lines north of Loughborough Junction from two to four.

In 1868, the London, Brighton and South Coast Railway opened a suburban line from London Bridge to Sutton via Tulse Hill. A 1 mi (1.6 km) connecting line from Tulse Hill to Herne Hill opened on 1 January 1869.

The platforms at Loughborough Junction between Camberwell and Herne Hill opened in 1872.

In 1874 the line was extended to Holborn Viaduct where a new terminus was built. In 1886 a second parallel bridge across the River Thames opened. At the northern end of the bridge St. Paul's station (later renamed Blackfriars) was opened by the London, Chatham and Dover Railway. Blackfriars Bridge station on the south bank closed at this time.

In 1900, it was suggested in The Contemporary Review that the City Branch should be replaced with an electric deep-level railway (i.e. a 'tube' line) between Herne Hill and Farringdon in order to remove Blackfriars Railway Bridge, which the author considered to be a blight on the Thames.

In 1916 passenger services through Snow Hill tunnel were discontinued, and trains from the south terminated at Holborn Viaduct. The tunnel remained in use for freight trains.

On 12 July 1925, a 660-volt third-rail system came into operation along the entire length of line. Electric trains ran every 20 minutes during the day

Trains on the City Branch were affected by World War II. Services were reduced from September 1939 to once every 30 minutes during the week and hourly at weekends; and the line was cut twice during the Blitz. On the second occasion, the railway bridge over Hinton Road (immediately south of Loughborough Junction) was destroyed. The route between Holborn Viaduct and Herne Hill was disrupted by 62 incidents during the war.

Snow Hill tunnel closed at the end of the 1960s and the tracks were lifted in 1971.

=== Thameslink Programme ===
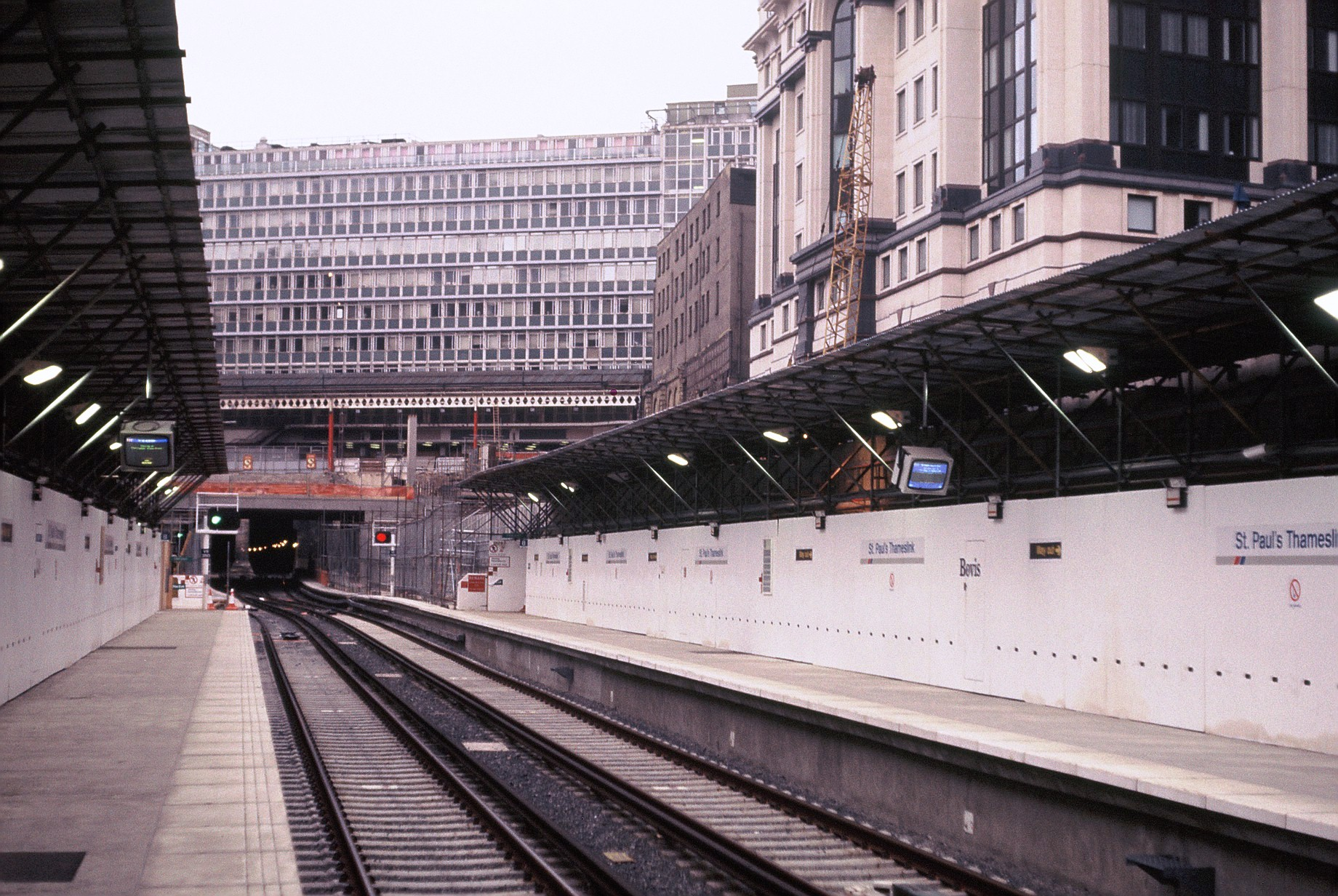
St Paul's Thameslink station shortly after opening, with the remains of Holborn Viaduct railway station in the background

In 1988, Snow Hill tunnel re-opened and the former LCDR City Branch formed the basis of the new Thameslink route. The line was dismantled between Ludgate Hill and Holborn Viaduct; instead a new section of Snow Hill tunnel was built. Holborn Viaduct station was demolished and replaced by St Paul's Thameslink station (later renamed City Thameslink) in the tunnel.

Network Rail began a major upgrade of the route in 2009. A key objective of the Thameslink Programme was allowing more trains to travel between central London and Brighton, which was prevented by a bottleneck between London Bridge and Blackfriars on a viaduct through the historic Borough Market. Network Rail initially suggested widening the viaduct and demolishing part of the market, but the public backlash against this plan prompted Network Rail to consider permanently routing all Thameslink trains to/from Brighton via Herne Hill, avoiding London Bridge and the market. This would have required the grade separation of the two lines through Herne Hill, which would have been achieved by constructing a new viaduct immediately to the east of the existing viaduct and using a fly-over to connect the southern end of the new viaduct to the line between Tulse Hill and North Dulwich (taking the tracks over the Chatham Main Line and towards Tulse Hill). This proposal was rejected in 2004 because of its environmental impact on Herne Hill and the larger number of interchanges offered on the London Bridge route; the Borough Market viaduct was widened instead. From December 2008 to May 2012, Thameslink trains serving Herne Hill did not run most weekends or after 22:30 every week-night because of construction work on the Thameslink route through central London as part of the Thameslink Programme.

During the initial planning in the late 1980s for High Speed 1, British Rail considered building the line to serve a low-level station at King's Cross via south London. An option for this route was via the City Branch, which would have required quadrupling the tracks between Loughborough Junction and Herne Hill.

== Services ==
=== Early services ===
From July 1863, LCDR trains between London and Kent ran to continental Europe via a connecting steamboat from Dover Harbour to Calais; these boat trains left Victoria and Ludgate Hill simultaneously and were joined at Herne Hill. to give passengers easier access to the City of London and beyond. The LCDR also began operating direct services to King's Cross and Barnet (now High Barnet Underground station) when Snow Hill tunnel opened.

A popular workmen's train (one penny per journey) ran between Ludgate Hill and Victoria via Herne Hill from 1865. Trains left from both termini at 04:55 and returned at 18:15. The LCDR was compelled to operate this service by Parliament to compensate for the large number of working-class homes destroyed in Camberwell during the construction of the line. Regular one-way fares from Herne Hill to Ludgate Hill were eightpence, sixpence and fourpence for first, second and third class respectively (or return for one shilling, ninepence and sevenpence respectively), with journey times of 15 minutes on express trains and 26 minutes when calling at all stops.

Both the Great Northern Railway (GNR) and the London and South Western Railway (LSWR) helped fund the Metropolitan Extensions (£320,000 and £310,000 respectively; £37,970,000 and £36,780,000 in 2023) in return for the right to use the LCDR's tracks. The LSWR began running trains between Ludgate Hill and Wimbledon via Herne Hill when the Tulse Hill extension was completed. Some of these services went as far as Kingston until the mid-1890s.

A late-night service from Ludgate Hill (departing 01:15) to Beckenham Junction via Herne Hill began in 1910. The intention was to satisfy journalists on Fleet Street who regularly complained in print about the poor quality of service on the line; those working on the morning papers often worked beyond midnight and missed the last train.

By 1959, the pattern of commuter services had taken the shape it held into the 21st century: all-stops trains from the City of London to Wimbledon and Sutton (but, unlike the modern Sutton Loop, via West Croydon).

=== Current ===
Passenger services are operated by Govia Thameslink Railway. Additional peak-services terminating at Blackfriars are run by Southeastern.

== Stations ==
Stations on the line are

- Herne Hill (opened 1862)
- Loughborough Junction (opened 1 March 1863 on west chord as Loughborough Road, renamed when City line and east chord platforms opened in 1872, west platforms closed 1916, east platforms closed 1925)
- Camberwell (opened as Camberwell New Road 6 October 1862, closed 1916)
- Walworth Road (opened as Camberwell Gate 1 May 1863, closed 1916)
- Elephant & Castle (opened 6 October 1862)
- Borough Road (opened 1 June 1864, closed 1907)
- Blackfriars Bridge (opened 1 June 1864, goods only from 1885, closed 1964) Now part of its site is the southbank entrance for Blackfriars station.
- Blackfriars (opened 1886 as St Paul's, renamed Blackfriars 1937)
- Ludgate Hill (opened 1865, closed 1929)
- Holborn Viaduct (opened 1874, closed 1990)

== Bibliography ==
- Dendy Marshall, C.F.; Kidner, R.W. (1968). A history of the Southern Railway (Combined Volume). London: Ian Allan. ISBN 978-0-7110-0059-9.
- "Fowler's Ghost" (May 1962). Cooke, B.W.C. (ed.). "Railway connections at King's Cross (part one)". The Railway Magazine. 108 (733). Tothill Press.
- Greater London Authority (February 2012). The Mayor's Rail Vision (PDF).
- Herne Hill Society (2003). Herne Hill Heritage Trail. London: Herne Hill Society. ISBN 978-1-873520-46-8.
- Jackson, Alan Arthur (1969). London's Termini. Newton Abbot: David & Charles. ISBN 978-0-7153-4474-3.
- Mitchell, Vic; Smith, Keith (1992). Victoria to Bromley South (Southern Main Line). Midhurst, W. Sussex: Middleton Press. ISBN 978-0-906520-98-7.
- Moody, G.T. (1957). Southern Electric. London: Ian Allan.
- Network Rail (June 2004). Thameslink 2000: Environmental Statement – Alternatives Report (PDF).
- Network Rail (March 2008). South London Route utilisation strategy (PDF). Archived from the original (PDF) on 19 January 2012.
- Network Rail (July 2011). London and South East Route utilisation strategy (PDF). Archived from the original (PDF) on 13 December 2013.
- Sheppard, F. H. W. (1956). Survey of London: volume 26: Lambeth: Southern area. British History Online.
- Southeastern (2015). Train Times from 11 January 2015 to 16 May 2015. Archived from the original on 3 March 2015.
- White, H.P. (1961). A Regional History of the Railways of Great Britain: Greater London. London: Phoenix House.
- White, H.P. (1971). A Regional History of the Railways of Great Britain: Greater London (New ed.). Newton Abbot: David & Charles. ISBN 978-0-7153-6145-0.
