= Holborn Viaduct =

Road bridge in London

Coordinates: 51°31′01.91″N 0°06′18.25″W

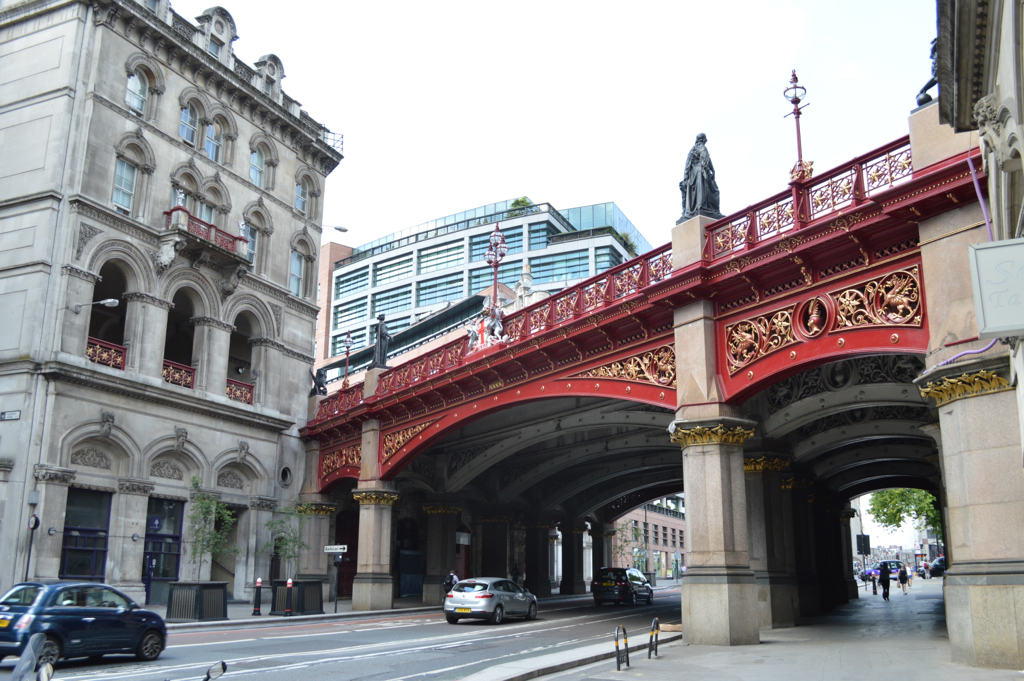
Holborn Viaduct in 2014

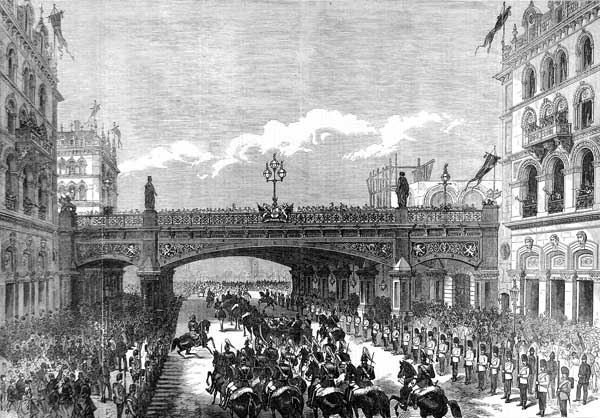
A royal procession under Holborn Viaduct in 1869

Map of Holborn Viaduct

Holborn Viaduct is a road bridge in London, and also the name of the street which crosses it (which forms part of the A40 route). Opened in 1869, it links Holborn, via Holborn Circus, with Newgate Street, in the City of London. It passes over Farringdon Street and the subterranean River Fleet. The viaduct spans the steep-sided Holborn Hill and the River Fleet valley. It is 1,400 feet (430 m) long and 80 feet (24 m) wide. City Surveyor William Haywood was the architect, and the engineer was Rowland Mason Ordish.

== History ==
Holborn Valley Improvement Act 1864
- Act of Parliament
- Parliament of the United Kingdom
- Long title: An Act to authorize the Corporation of the City of London to form a Viaduct or raised Way across the Holborn Valley, and new Streets and Improvements connected therewith; and for other Purposes.
- Citation: 27 & 28 Vict. c. lxi

Dates
- Royal assent: 23 June 1864

Holborn Valley Improvement (Additional Works) Act 1867
- Act of Parliament
- Parliament of the United Kingdom
- Long title: An Act for authorizing additional Works in connexion with the Holborn Valley Viaduct; and for other Purposes.
- Citation: 30 & 31 Vict. c. lv

Dates
- Royal assent: 31 May 1867
Other legislation
Repealed by	City of London (Various Powers) Act 1969

Status: Repealed

Text of statute as originally enacted

Holborn Valley Improvement (Money) Act 1869
- Act of Parliament
- Parliament of the United Kingdom
- Long title: An Act for authorizing the Mayor and Commonalty and Citizens of the City of London to raise a further sum of Money for the completion of the Holborn Valley Viaduct, and the streets and works connected therewith.
- Citation: 32 & 33 Vict. c. xx

Dates
- Royal assent: 24 June 1869
Other legislation
Repealed by	City of London (Various Powers) Act 1969

Status: Repealed

Text of statute as originally enacted

Holborn Viaduct was built between 1863 and 1869, as part of the Holborn Valley Improvements. These included a public works scheme costing over £2.5 million (over £257 million in 2025), which improved access into the City from the West End, with better traffic flow and distribution around the new Holborn Circus, the creation of Queen Victoria Street, the rebuilding of Blackfriars Bridge, the opening of the Embankment section into the City, the continuation of Farringdon Street as Farringdon Road and associated railway routes with Farringdon station and Ludgate Hill station. It was opened by Queen Victoria at the same time as the inauguration of the other thoroughfares, with a formal coach drive procession on 6 November 1869.

The viaduct crosses the junction of Victoria Street with Farringdon Street, at the point where Oldbourne Bridge had spanned the River Fleet before it was culverted for the creation of Farringdon Street and its market in 1734, thus enabling east-west traffic to avoid the steep gradients of the Holborn/Fleet valley at Holborn Hill and Snow Hill (also Skinner Street from 1829).

Pedestrian access between the viaduct and Farringdon Street below was provided by staircases in four pavilions, at each side and either end. The pavilions' parapets are adorned with statues of important figures in the history of London: William Walworth (north west), Hugh Myddelton (north east), Henry fitz Ailwin (south west), and Thomas Gresham (south east). On the viaduct there are figurative statues to represent fine art and science on the north side, by the sculpture firm Farmer & Brindley, and commerce and agriculture on the south side, both by sculptor Henry Bursill. In 1941 the Blitz raids destroyed and damaged most of the area, including the north side pavilions; these were copied and reinstated with associated property developments in 2000 (western) and 2014 (eastern), including lifts.

Holborn Viaduct railway station, opened on 2 March 1874, was at the eastern end with a low-level through route towards Farringdon; it was replaced in 1990 by St. Paul's Thameslink railway station (later renamed City Thameslink).

In 1882, 57 Holborn Viaduct, on the north-eastern side, became home to the world's first coal-fired power station, the Edison Electric Light Station, operational from 1882 to 1886. The building in which it was housed was destroyed by bombing during the Blitz, and the large building called 60 Holborn Viaduct has since subsumed the site.

== See also ==
- List of bridges in London

== Bibliography ==
- Butt, R. V. J. (October 1995). The Directory of Railway Stations: details every public and private passenger station, halt, platform and stopping place, past and present (1st ed.). Sparkford: Patrick Stephens Ltd. ISBN 978-1-85260-508-7. OCLC 60251199. OL 11956311M.
- Weinreb, Ben; Hibbert, Christopher; Keay, John; Keay, Julia, eds. (2008) [1983]. The London Encyclopaedia (Third ed.). Macmillan. ISBN 978-1-405-04924-5.
