= Camberwell railway station =

Camberwell railway station may refer to:

- Camberwell railway station (England), a former station on the Thameslink line in London
- Camberwell railway station, Melbourne, on the Lilydale, Belgrave and Alamein lines in Victoria, Australia
