= Snow Hill tunnel (London) =

Railway tunnel in London

Coordinates: 51°31′4″N 0°6′14″W

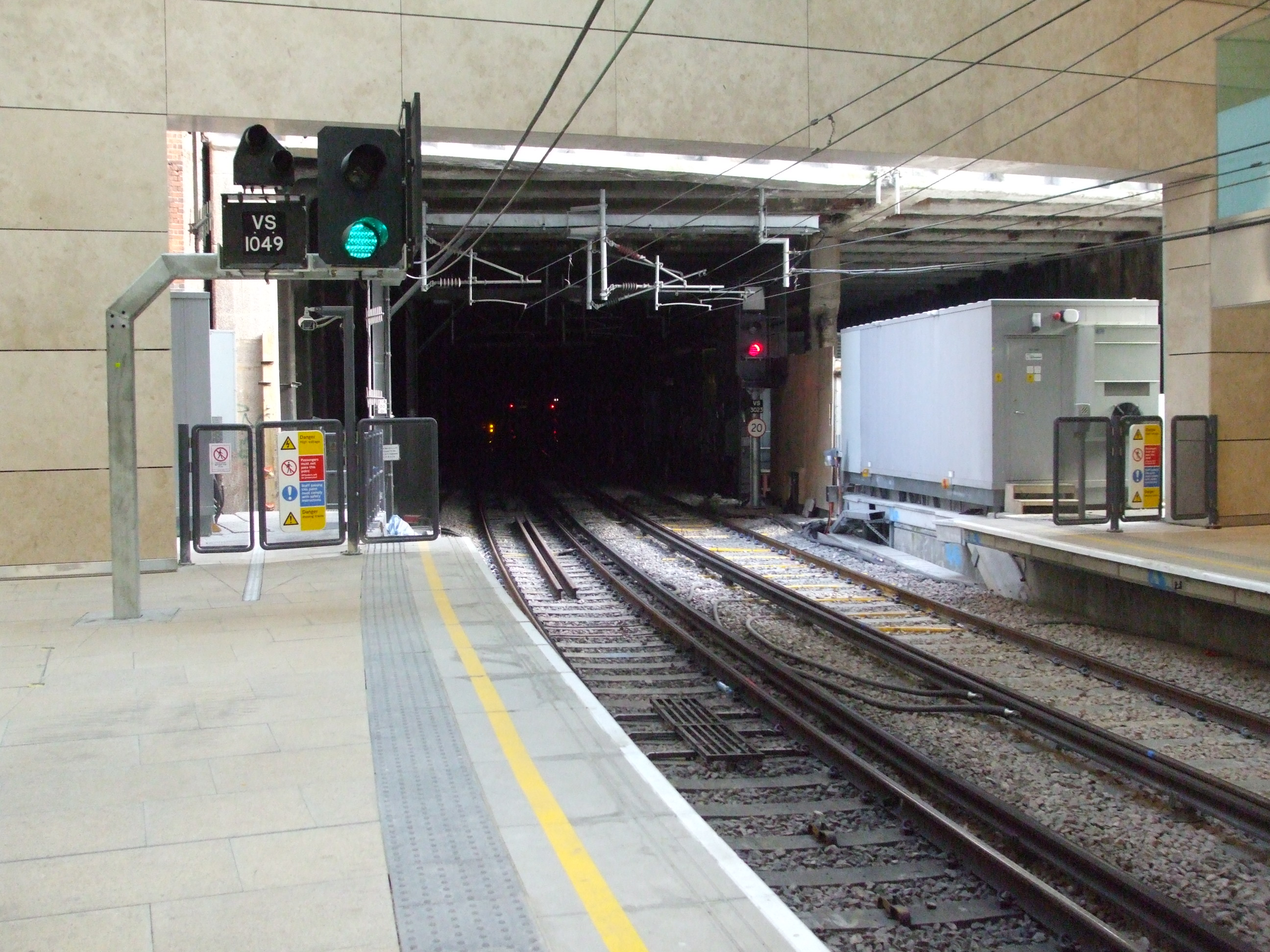
The northern portal of the tunnel in 2012, seen from Farringdon station

Snow Hill tunnel is a railway tunnel on the northern edge of the City of London which carries the up and down Snow Hill lines between City Thameslink and Farringdon stations. The tunnel runs beneath the Smithfield meat market and was constructed, using the cut-and-cover method, immediately prior to the building of the market. The tunnel opened on 1 January 1866.

== History ==
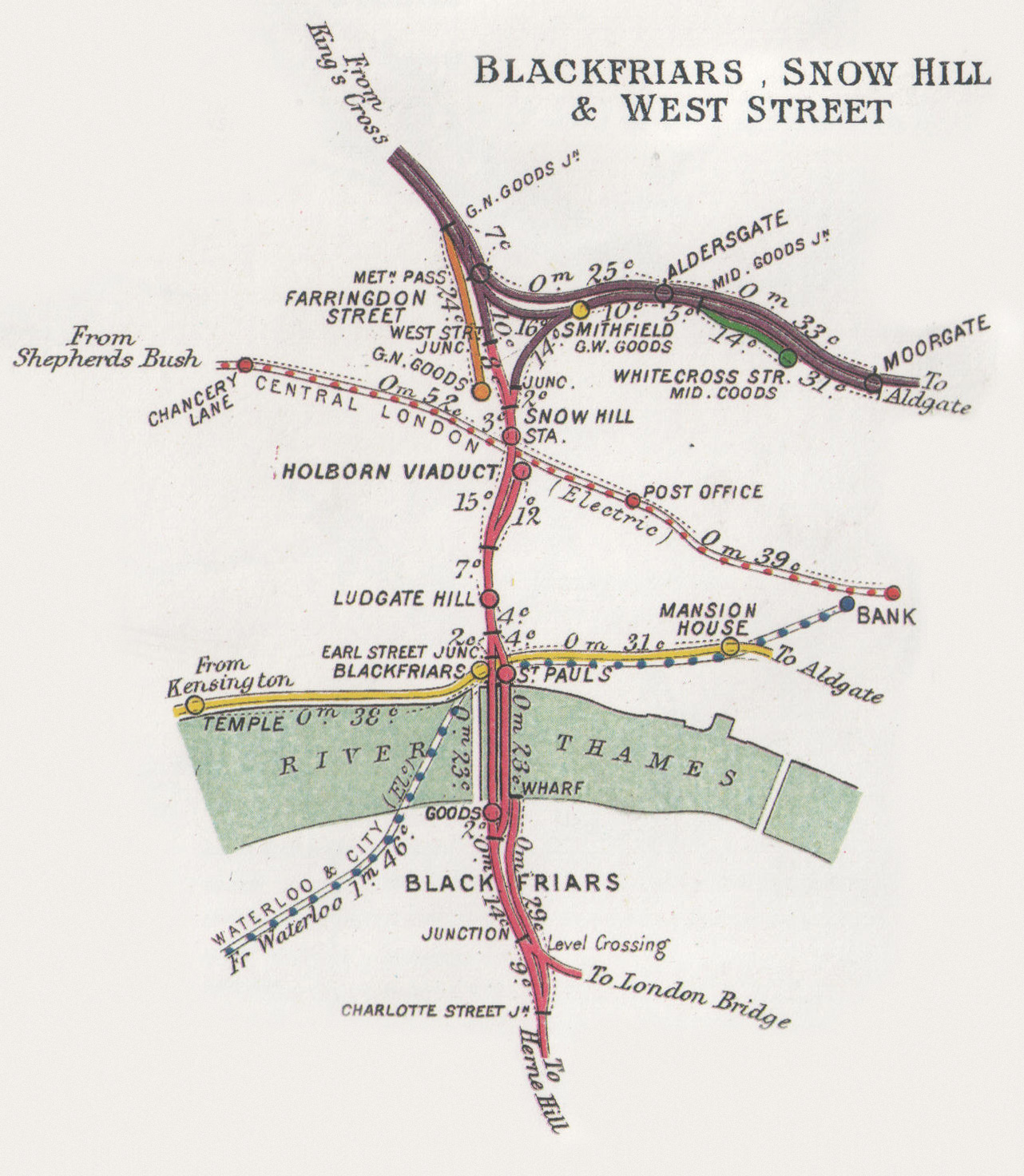
1914 map showing the area of Snow Hill tunnel.

Snow Hill tunnel was constructed by the London, Chatham and Dover Railway (LC&DR) to connect its line from Herne Hill to the recently opened Metropolitan Railway's Widened Lines, south of Farringdon station. To the north-west, the Widened Lines in turn connected to the tracks of the Great Northern Railway at King's Cross, and the Midland Railway at St Pancras, via tunnels running beneath the two main line termini. Snow Hill tunnel thus provided the crucial link in the only north–south railway route through central London, enabling a number of main line railway companies to run cross-London passenger and goods services.

In 1871, an additional, eastwards tunnel was opened, which had connection to the Metropolitan Railway's tracks, enabling trains from the south to also serve Aldersgate (now Barbican) and Moorgate Street (now Moorgate) stations. The eastward curve also connected to an extensive Great Western Railway goods station beneath Smithfield market (now a car park). This Smithfield Curve (which had a very tight radius and could not be used by bogie stock) closed in 1916. The goods station, like those of the GNR, Midland Railway and the Metropolitan Railway, all located nearby, is no longer in use.

A station, also named Snow Hill, was opened in the tunnel in 1874, providing an interchange with the LC&DR's adjacent terminus at Holborn Viaduct station. Snow Hill station closed in 1916, although the tunnel remained in use for goods traffic until the end of the 1960s.

The tracks were lifted in 1971 and the tunnel was abandoned for fifteen years.

=== Revival ===
Works began in 1986 to bring the north–south route back into operation as part of the Thameslink route. New tracks were laid in 1988 and services reopened in 1990. Initially, it was expected that a new station would be built at the site, but this was transferred to what is now City Thameslink (originally called St Paul's Thameslink).

The southern end of the tunnel was originally adjacent to Holborn Viaduct station, with trains running on a viaduct between there and Blackfriars. As part of the Thameslink works, the viaduct was demolished and replaced with a new section of cut-and-cover tunnel running most of the way to Blackfriars, incorporating City Thameslink station. To provide clearance for the new tunnel below, road levels at the western end of Ludgate Hill and in the adjacent junction of Ludgate Circus were raised several feet.

== Gallery ==
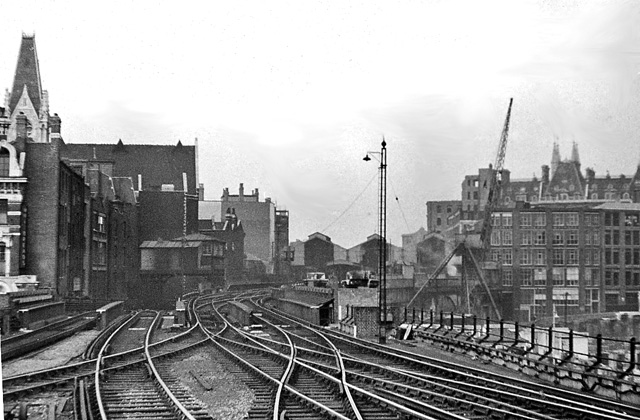
Southern end of Snow Hill tunnel in 1953, on the right tracks to Holborn Viaduct station

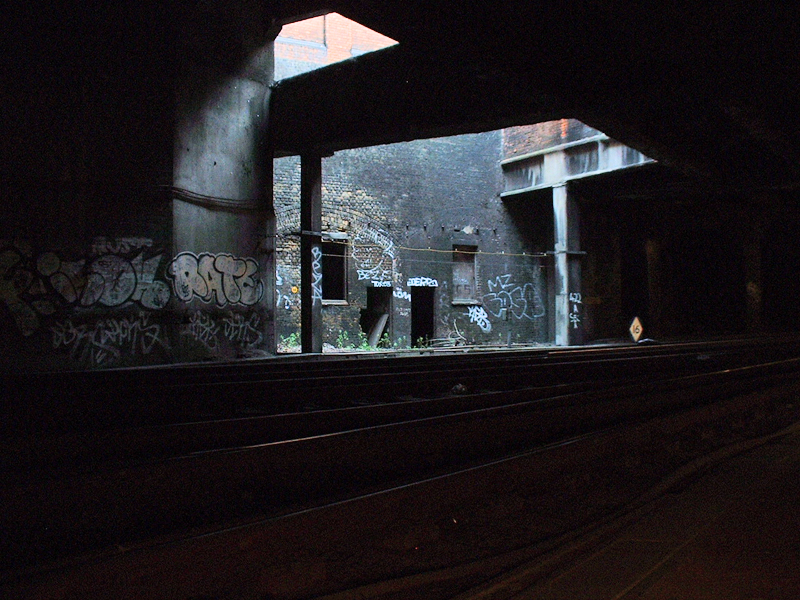
Modern picture of Snow Hill Tunnel

== See also ==
- Ludgate Hill railway station – closed station on the viaduct a short distance north of Blackfriars station. It was demolished with the viaduct.
- North Western and Charing Cross Railway – approved but unbuilt tunnel between Euston and Charing Cross stations
