= Ludgate Hill railway station =

Former railway station in England

Ludgate Hill
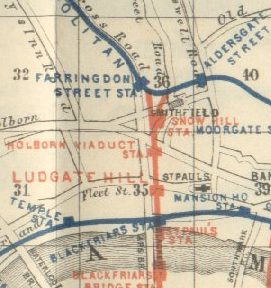
- Interactive map of Ludgate Hill

General information
- Location: City of London
- Owner: London, Chatham and Dover Railway
- Number of platforms: 2

Key dates
- 1 June 1865: Opened
- 3 March 1929: Closed
- Replaced by: none

Other information
- Coordinates: 51.5129°N 0.1036°W

Ludgate Hill was a railway station in the City of London that was opened on 1 June 1865 by the London, Chatham and Dover Railway (LC&DR) as its City terminus. It was on Ludgate Viaduct (a railway viaduct) between Queen Victoria Street and Ludgate Hill, slightly north of St. Paul's station (now called Blackfriars station) on the site of the former Fleet Prison.

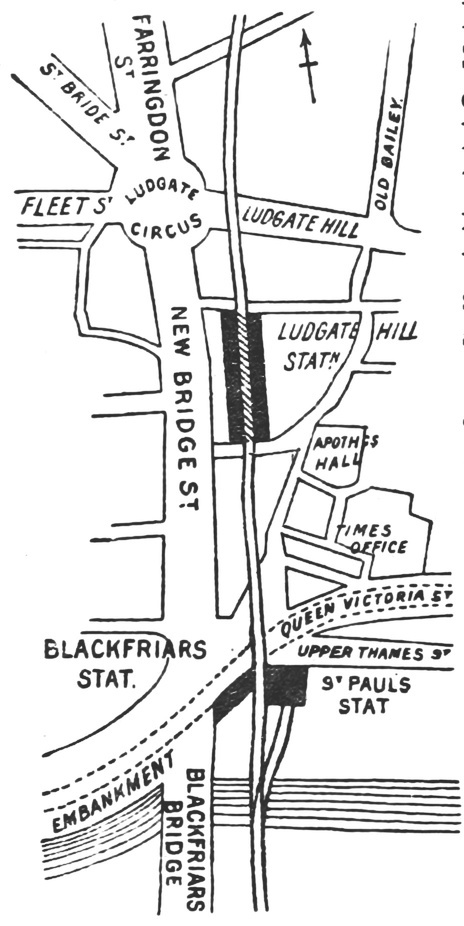
Ludgate Hill and surrounding streets in 1888

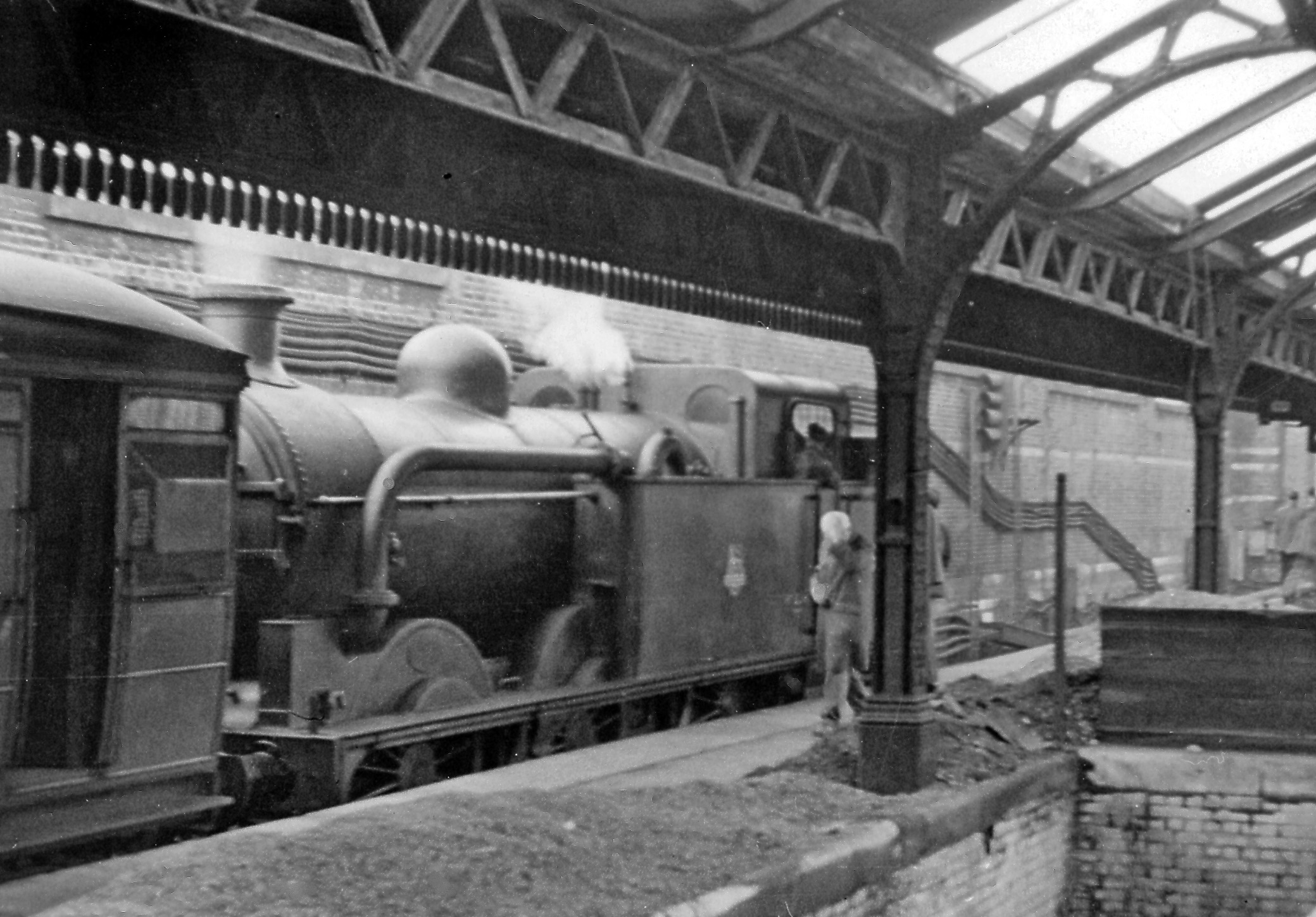
Ludgate Hill station (remains), with RCTS rail tour in 1953.

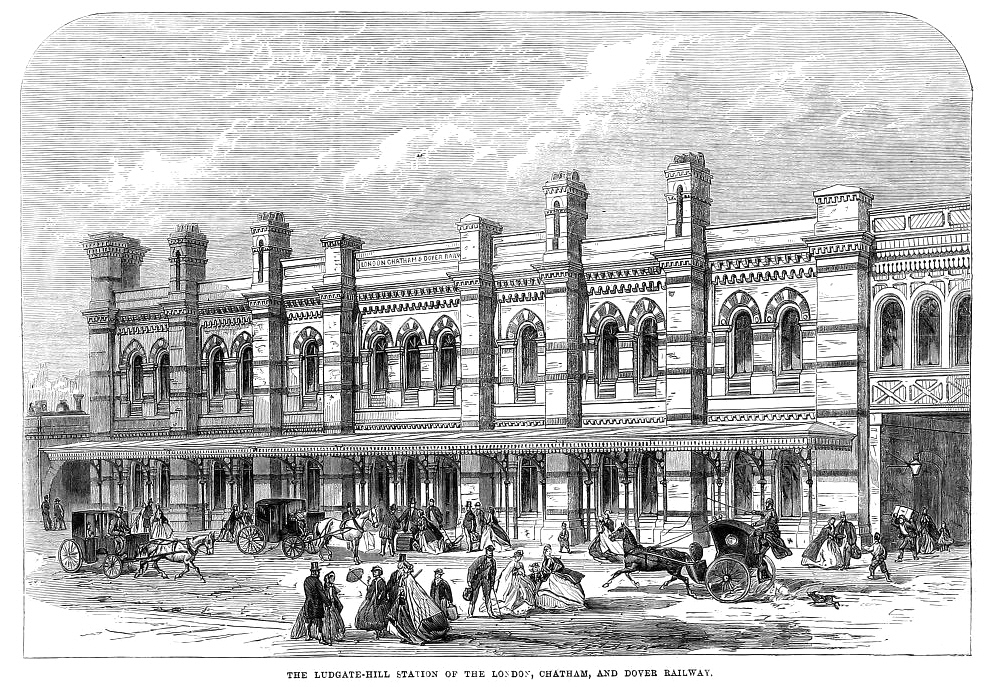
The station in 1865

North of Ludgate Hill station, Ludgate Viaduct continued to the Snow Hill tunnel to connect with the then recently opened Metropolitan Railway south of Farringdon station to enable main-line trains to run between north and south London.

Passenger services through the tunnel ended in 1916, after which services ran only the few hundred yards (metres) to Holborn Viaduct station which had opened in 1874. Ludgate Hill became little used because of its proximity to the Holborn Viaduct and St. Paul's stations, and on 3 March 1929 Ludgate Hill was closed. The platform buildings remained derelict until they were demolished in the 1960s but the island platform remained until 1974. Remains of the street-level buildings and traces of the platform and staircase lasted until the whole station area and viaduct were demolished in 1990.

In the 1970s, in the Fleet line proposal, preparatory work began for Ludgate Circus Underground station very near the site of the former Ludgate Hill station, but it was abandoned when a different alignment was chosen for the Jubilee line, as it later became known.

An office building now stands at the site, above a new tunnel which connects the revived Snow Hill tunnel and Blackfriars station for Thameslink services. City Thameslink station, the platforms of which are in tunnel, has its southern exit building on Ludgate Hill, 90 metres north of the centre of the old station.

Preceding station	Disused railways	Following station
Holborn Viaduct; Line and station closed	London, Chatham & Dover Railway; City branch	Blackfriars; Line and station open

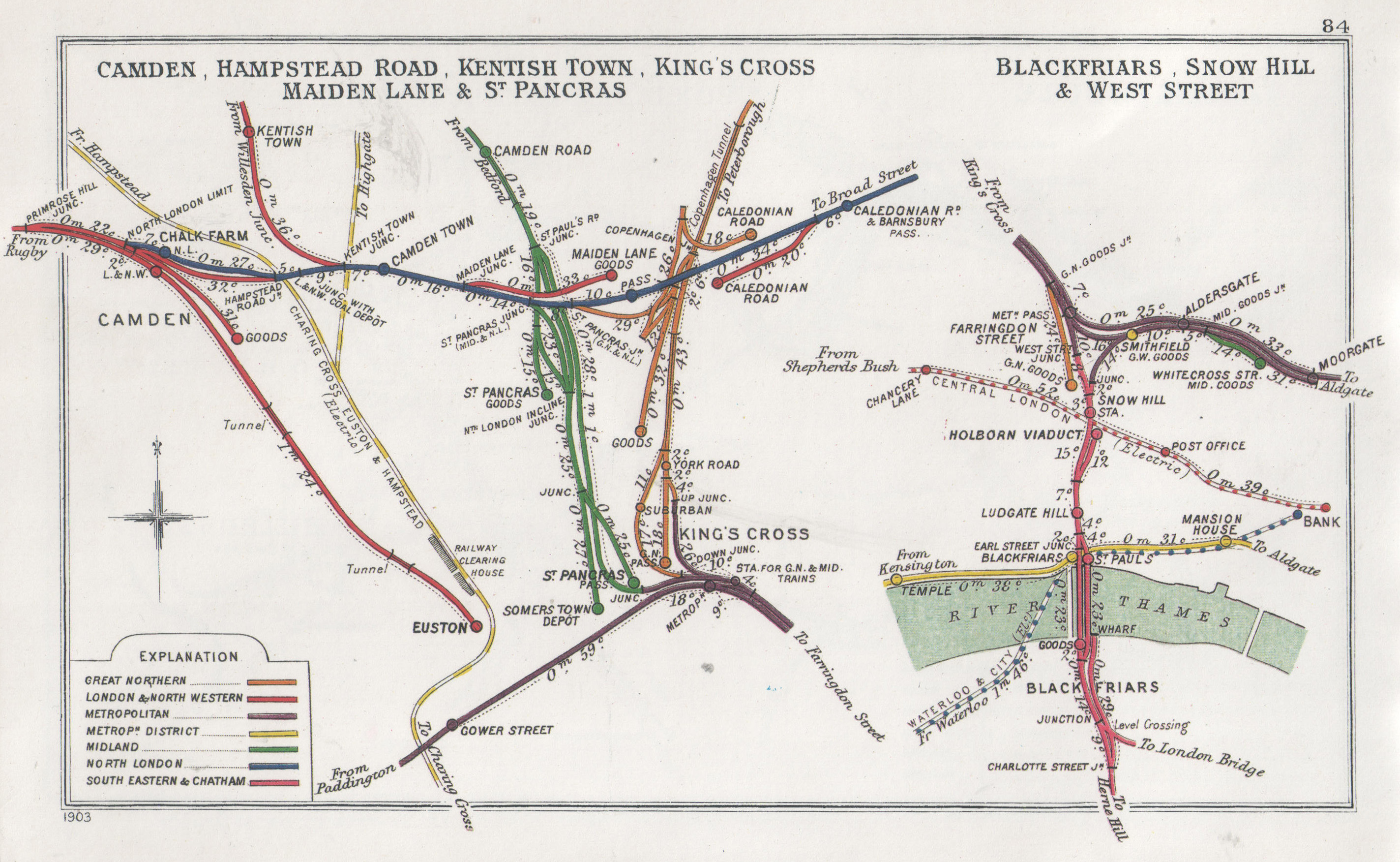
A 1903 Railway Clearing House map of lines around Ludgate Hill railway station

== See also ==
- List of closed railway stations in London
