= Walworth Road railway station =

Former railway station in England

Walworth Road
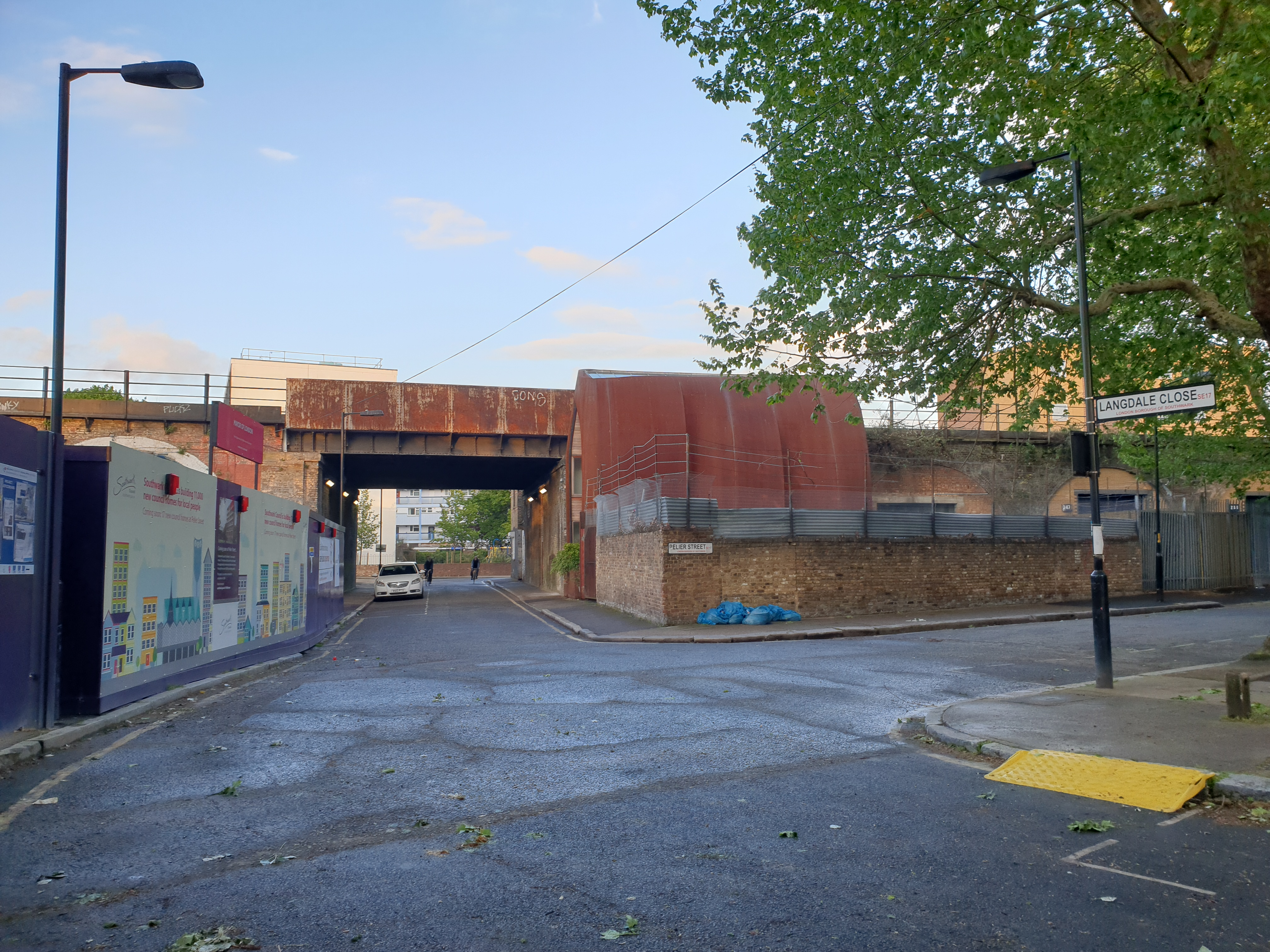
- Walworth Road railway station site
- Interactive map of Walworth Road

General information
- Location: Walworth
- Local authority: Metropolitan Borough of Camberwell
- Number of platforms: 4

Railway companies
- Original company: London, Chatham and Dover Railway

Key dates
- 1 May 1863: Opened
- 3 April 1916: Closed to passengers

Other information
- Coordinates: 51.4842°N 0.0957°W

Walworth Road railway station was a railway station in Walworth Road, Southwark, south London, England, on the London Chatham & Dover Railway, which opened on 1 May 1863 on the City Branch to Blackfriars as part of the company's ambitious plan to extend into the City of London. It was originally known as Camberwell Gate before changing its name in 1865.

Along with many other London stations, World War I wartime restraints forced it to close on 3 April 1916. At the time, the closure was considered temporary, but the station never reopened and was subsequently demolished. Today there are virtually no traces that this was once a station. It was planned in the 1950s to open a tube station in Walworth on the Bakerloo line, but the plans were abandoned.

British Rail did consider reopening the station as part of Thameslink in the 1980s but never materialised.

== History ==
In 1879 the LCDR was running the following services that stopped at Walworth Road:

- Frequent trains between Moorgate and Victoria, calling at all stations (Note: Trains called at Moorgate Street, Aldersgate Street, Snow Hill, Ludgate Hill, Blackfriars, Borough Road, Elephant and Castle, Walworth Road, Camberwell, Loughborough Junction, Brixton and South Stockwell, Clapham and North Stockwell, Wandsworth Road, Battersea Park Road, Grosvenor Road and Victoria)
- Half-hourly trains between Moorgate and Clapham Junction, calling at all stations (Note: Trains ran as for the Moorgate to Victoria service, calling only at Clapham Junction after Wandsworth Road.)
- Through trains from Kentish Town to Victoria, calling at all stations (Note: Trains called at Kentish Town, King's Cross (York Road), King's Cross (Metropolitan), Farringdon Street, Snow Hill then as for the Moorgate to Victoria service.)

Preceding station	Historical railways	Following station
Elephant & Castle; Line open, station open	London, Chatham & Dover Railway; City Branch	Camberwell; Line open, station closed
