= Loughborough Junction railway station =

Railway station in London

Loughborough Junction
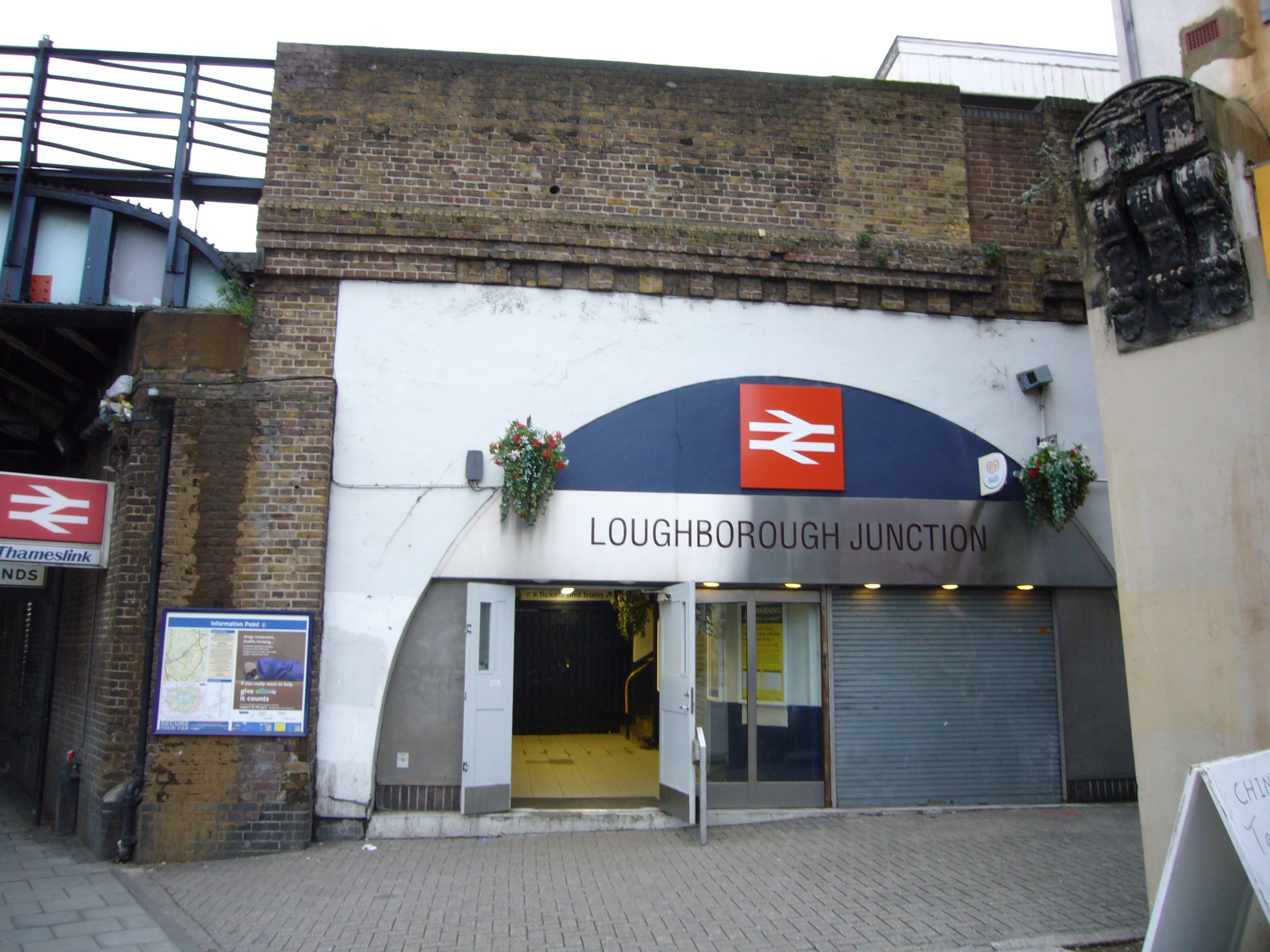
- The station entrance on 2 January 2007
- Interactive map of Loughborough Junction

General information
- Location: Brixton
- Local authority: London Borough of Lambeth
- Managed by: Thameslink
- Station code: LGJ
- DfT category: E
- Number of platforms: 2
- Fare zone: 2

National Rail annual entry and exit
- 2020–21: ▼0.398 million
- 2021–22: ▲0.722 million
- 2022–23: ▲0.952 million
- 2023–24: ▲1.129 million
- 2024–25: ▲1.234 million

Railway companies
- Original company: London, Chatham and Dover Railway

Key dates
- Oct 1864: Brixton spur platforms opened as "Loughborough Road".
- 1 Dec 1872: Main line and Cambria spur platforms opened. Station renamed "Loughborough Junction"
- 3 April 1916: Brixton spur platforms closed
- 12 July 1925: Cambria spur platforms closed

Other information
- External links: Departures; Facilities
- Coordinates: 51.4661°N 0.102°W

Loughborough Junction railway station is a railway station in the Loughborough Junction neighbourhood nearby Herne Hill in the London Borough of Lambeth. It was opened as Loughborough Road by the London, Chatham and Dover Railway in 1864. It is between Elephant & Castle and Herne Hill stations and is served by Thameslink reaching Central London in just 9 minutes

== History ==
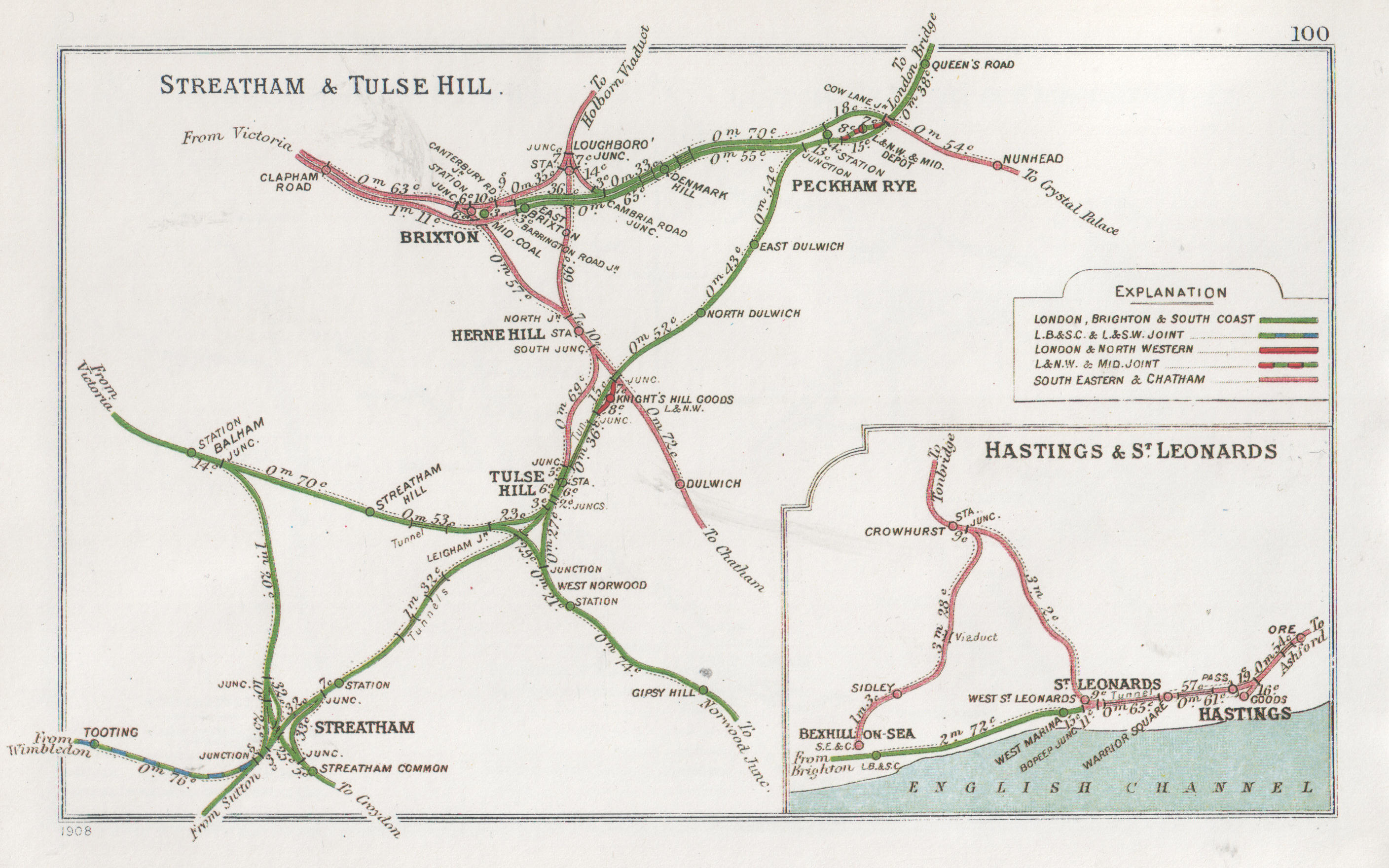
A 1908 Railway Clearing House map of lines around Loughborough Junction railway station

On 6 October 1862 the London, Chatham and Dover Railway (LCDR) opened its City Branch from Herne Hill to Elephant and Castle. Services ran from Victoria to Elephant and Castle via a reversing move at Herne Hill. From 1 May 1863 services ran directly from Brixton to Camberwell via a curve at Loughborough Junction. Services were extended from Elephant and Castle to Blackfriars on 1 June 1894.

In October 1864 the LCDR opened Loughborough Road station on the north-to-west Brixton spur which connects the City Branch to the original Chatham Main Line at Brixton station.

On 1 December 1872 platforms were opened on the City branch and on the north-to-east spur (called the Cambria Road platforms and spur after nearby Cambria Road). The enlarged station was renamed Loughborough Junction.

The Loughborough Road platforms closed during the First World War on 3 April 1916 when the Victoria to Moorgate local service was withdrawn. This also led to the closure of Camberwell and Walworth Road stations to the north and the loss of direct service to Brixton, Clapham, Wandsworth Road, Battersea Park Road and Victoria.

In connection with the Southern Railway suburban electrification the platforms on Cambria Jn spur could not be lengthened so were closed on 12 July 1925.

After nationalisation the station was part of the Southern Region of British Railways and, from 1986, Network SouthEast. Around 1990 the station became part of the Thameslink route.

== Services ==
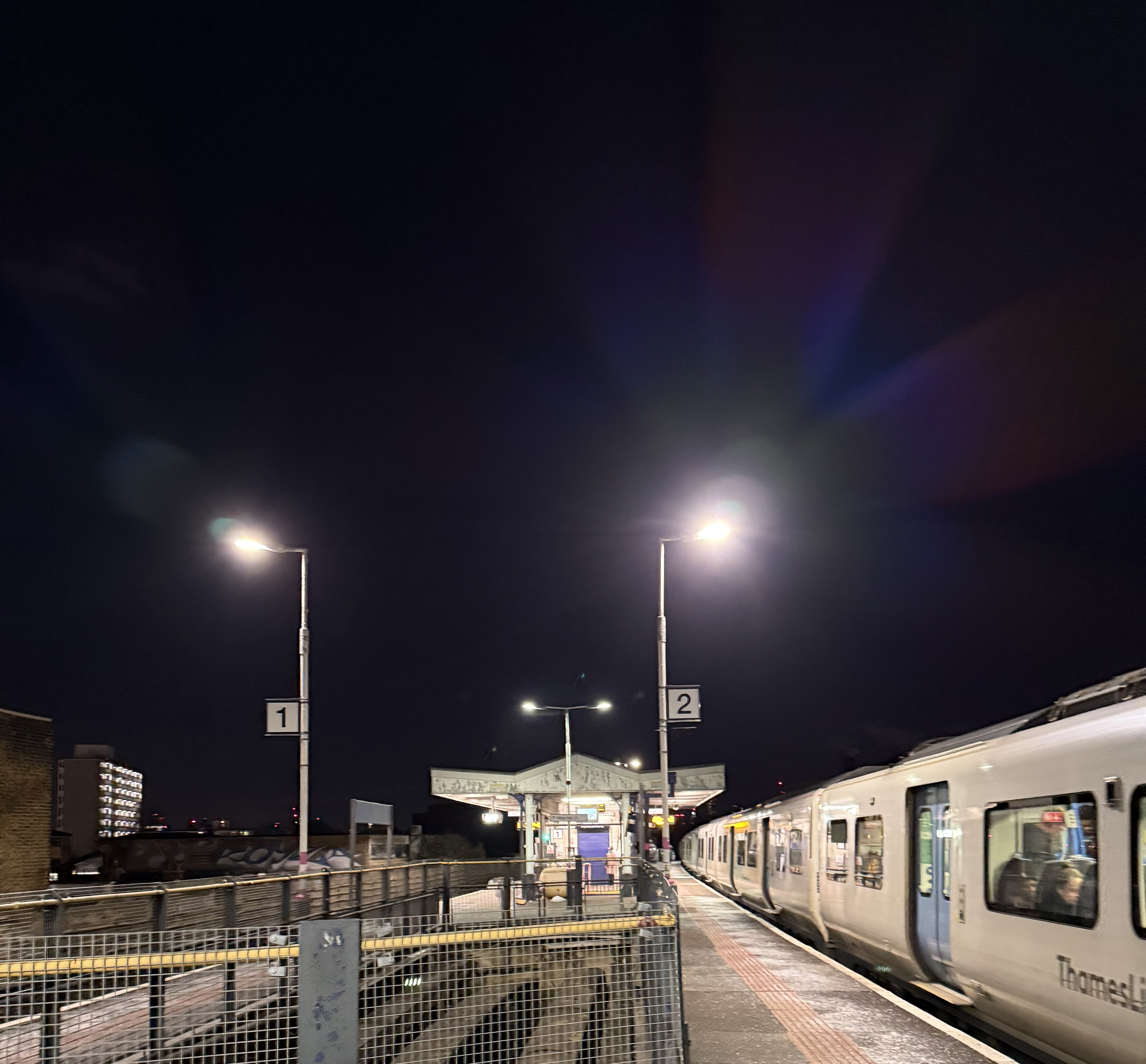
Looking north from Loughborough Junction station showing platform 1 and 2. The train on platform 2 is the Thameslink service to St Pancras.

Off-peak, all services at Loughborough Junction are operated by Thameslink using Class 700 EMUs.

The typical off-peak service in trains per hour is:

- 4 tph to St Albans City
- 4 tph to Sutton (2 of these run via Mitcham Junction and 2 run via Wimbledon)

During the peak hours, a small number of Southeastern services between Beckenham Junction and London Blackfriars call at the station. The station is served by five trains to London Blackfriars in the morning peak and two trains to Beckenham Junction in the evening peak.

A small number of late evening Thameslink services are extended beyond St Albans City to Bedford. On Sundays, there are also direct services beyond St Albans City to Luton.

Preceding station	National Rail	Following station
Elephant & Castle	Thameslink Thameslink	Herne Hill
Elephant & Castle	Southeastern Bromley South Line Peak Hours Only	Herne Hill
	Historical railways	
Camberwell	London, Chatham and Dover Railway: Victoria–City Branch; 1864–1916	Brixton
Camberwell	London, Chatham and Dover Railway: Cambria Road Spur; 1872–1925	Denmark Hill

== Connections ==
London Buses routes 35, 45, 345, P4 and P5 and night route N35 serve the station.

== Future proposals ==
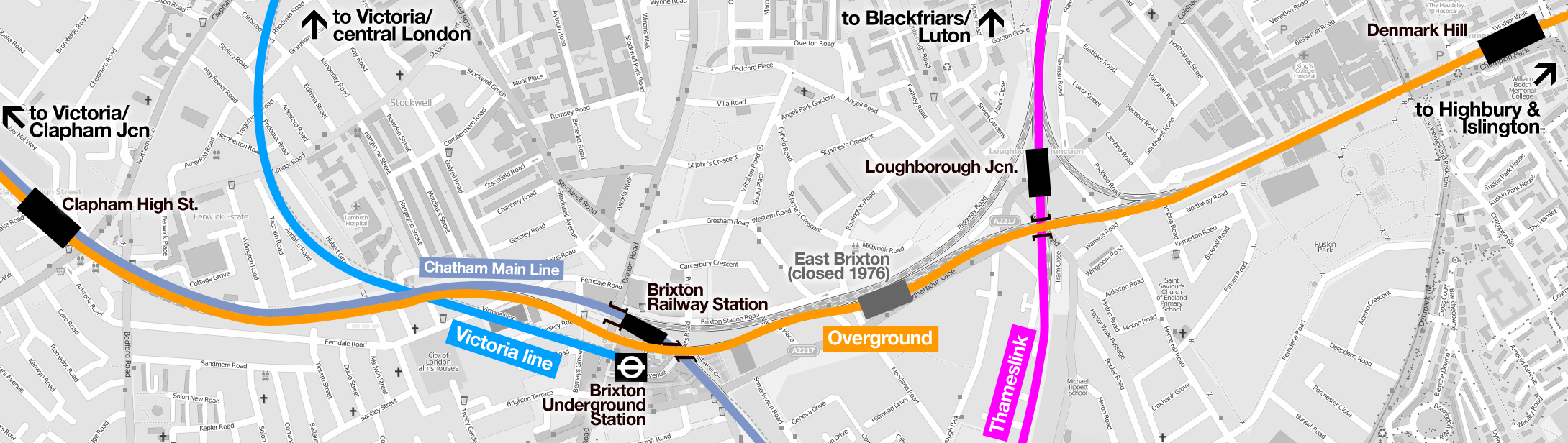
Map of rail & tube lines passing through Brixton, showing the location of Loughborough Junction and the route of London Overground

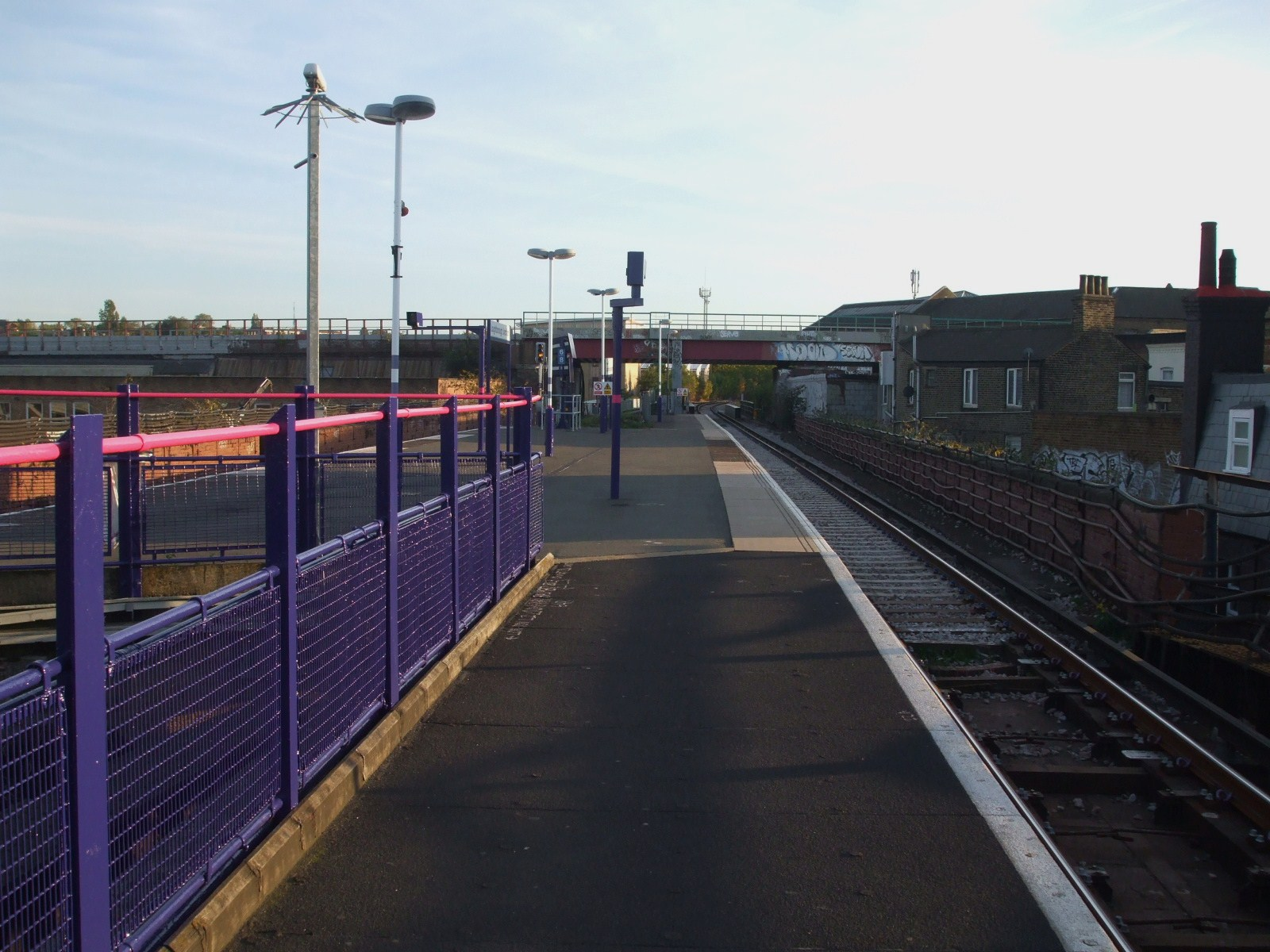
The South London line, seen from Loughborough Junction

The South London line passes across the south end of Loughborough Junction station via a bridge but has never had platforms there. As part of phase 2 of the East London line extension project, this line is now part of the London Overground network operated by Transport for London. Completed on 9 December 2012, this extension connected the South London Line to the East and West London lines, allowing rail services to run across South London from Surrey Quays to Clapham Junction. This creates an orbital network around Central London, fulfilling the Orbirail concept.

The new route passes over both Loughborough Junction and Brixton stations, and the proposals were criticised for not including new interchange stations at these locations. No London Overground platforms are planned at Loughborough Junction as the line is on high railway arches, making the cost of any station construction prohibitive. It has been proposed, as an alternative, that the disused East Brixton could be reopened instead as the site is close to both stations.

Lambeth Council has expressed a desire to improve access to the station, although currently this is restricted to a narrow staircase from street level.

== See also ==
- Loughborough Junction – the area around the station
