= Holborn Viaduct railway station =

Former railway station in London, England

Holborn Viaduct
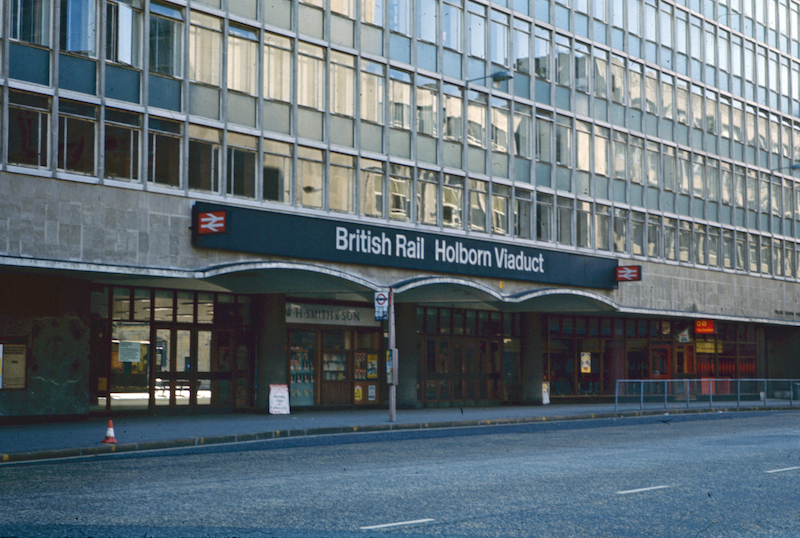
- The station entrance in August 1977
- Interactive map of Holborn Viaduct

General information
- Location: City of London
- Owner: London, Chatham and Dover Railway
- Number of platforms: 6

Key dates
- 2 March 1874: Opened
- 29 January 1990: Closed
- Replaced by: City Thameslink

Other information
- Coordinates: 51.5162°N 0.1036°W

Holborn Viaduct was a railway station in the City of London, England, which provided local and commuter services between 1874 and 1990. It was located to the south-east of Holborn Viaduct and east of Farringdon Street.

The station was opened by the London, Chatham and Dover Railway to alleviate increased usage of the nearby Ludgate Hill station. It was originally a through station, with services continuing through the Snow Hill tunnel to Farringdon and King's Cross. Passenger services through the tunnel ceased in 1916 and consequently Holborn Viaduct became a terminal station for trains from the south. The short distance between itself and Ludgate Hill saw the latter being closed in 1929.

Holborn Viaduct station became less used through the 20th century, serving a few local commuting services around southeast London and Kent. The station became redundant with the creation of the Thameslink service in the late 1980s; it was closed by British Rail and was replaced at the same location by City Thameslink.

== Opening ==
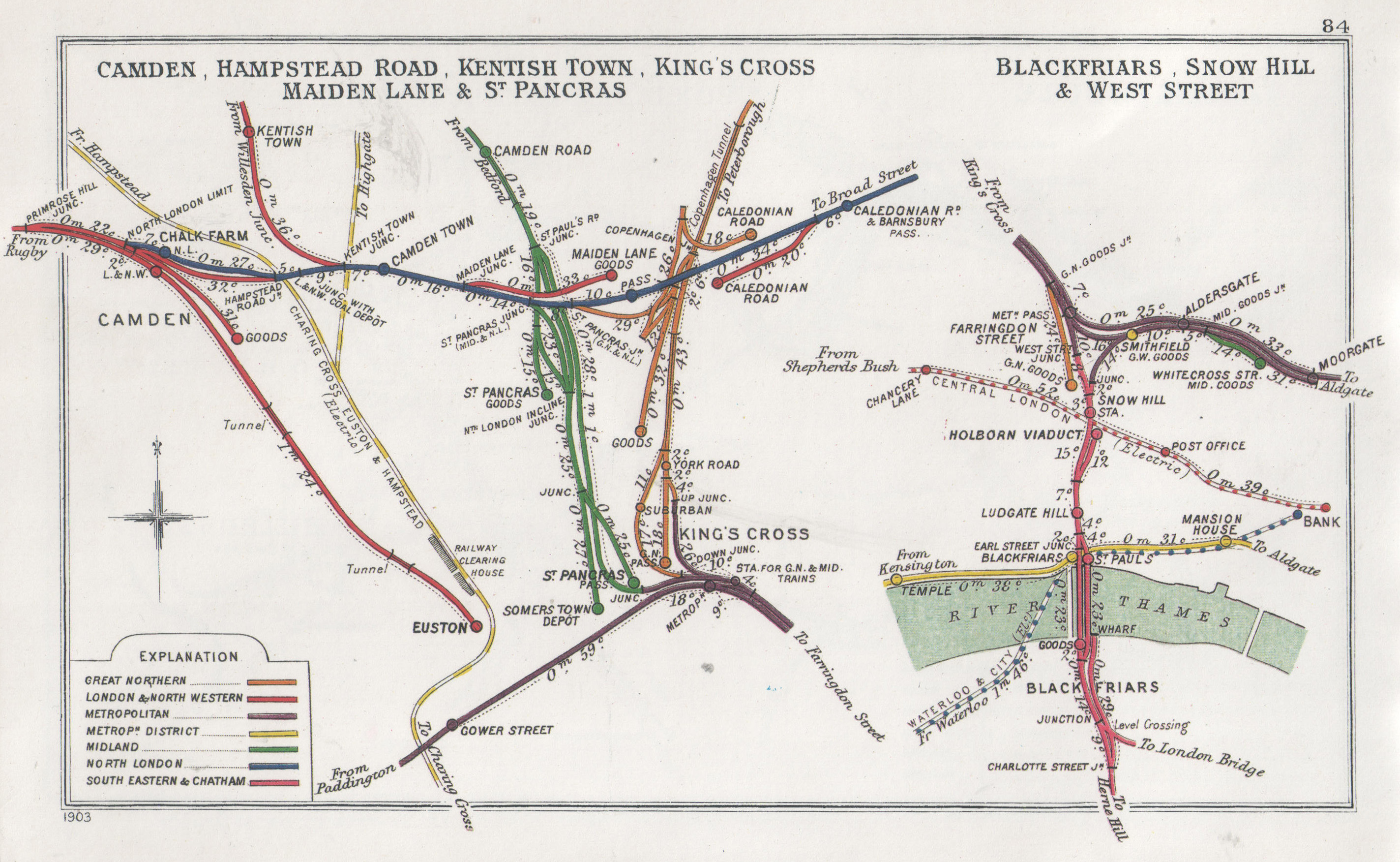
A 1914 Railway Clearing House map of lines around the sites of Holborn Viaduct and Snow Hill stations

The London Chatham and Dover Railway (LCDR) had changed its name from the East Kent Railway in 1859, in order to compete with the rivalling South Eastern Railway (SER) and build a railway into Central London. They had opened Ludgate Hill station on 1 June 1865, but it had begun to struggle with increasing numbers of trains. The LCDR was suffering financial problems following the extravagant spending to build the line, which would plague the company for the rest of its lifespan, and was unable to raise capital to expand the station.

The London and South Western Railway (LSWR) had agreed to fund £310,000 to the LCDR, while the Great Northern Railway donated £320,000. A shell company, the Holborn Viaduct Station Company, was set up to construct a 330-yard (300 m) branch from the Ludgate Hill-Farringdon line that would terminate at a new station located on Holborn Viaduct, which would also have a new hotel forming its frontage.

Holborn Viaduct was constructed as a six-platform terminus, with two island platforms and two side platforms, covered by a three-roof train shed. Each of the platforms was 400 feet (120 m) long. The redevelopment that began in 1963 saw the replacement of the train shed with shorter platform canopies, while a new concourse was constructed within the new office building on the ground floor level; the platforms were located at the first floor level.

The station opened on 2 March 1874, with the intention that it be used as a terminus for main line and continental trains. These services were intended to operate to both the City of London and the West End of London. Holborn Viaduct was well placed for this, as it was near the City and the mainline terminals along the New Road, yet also the nearest terminus to South London. Trains would travel as far as Herne Hill where they would split, with one portion going to Holborn Viaduct and the other to Victoria. Local services carried on through the Snow Hill Tunnel to join the Metropolitan Railway's Widened Lines at Farringdon Street station (now Farringdon), with a pair of low-level platforms just north of Holborn Viaduct to allow interchange with the main line services. Opened on 1 August 1874, these platforms formed a small station named Snow Hill, which was renamed Holborn Viaduct Low Level on 1 May 1912.

On 10 May 1886, St Paul's station opened further south on the LC&DR line, just to the north of Blackfriars Bridge. This caused a drop in traffic at Holborn Viaduct, as St Paul's was more accessible for some destinations.

=== Hotel ===
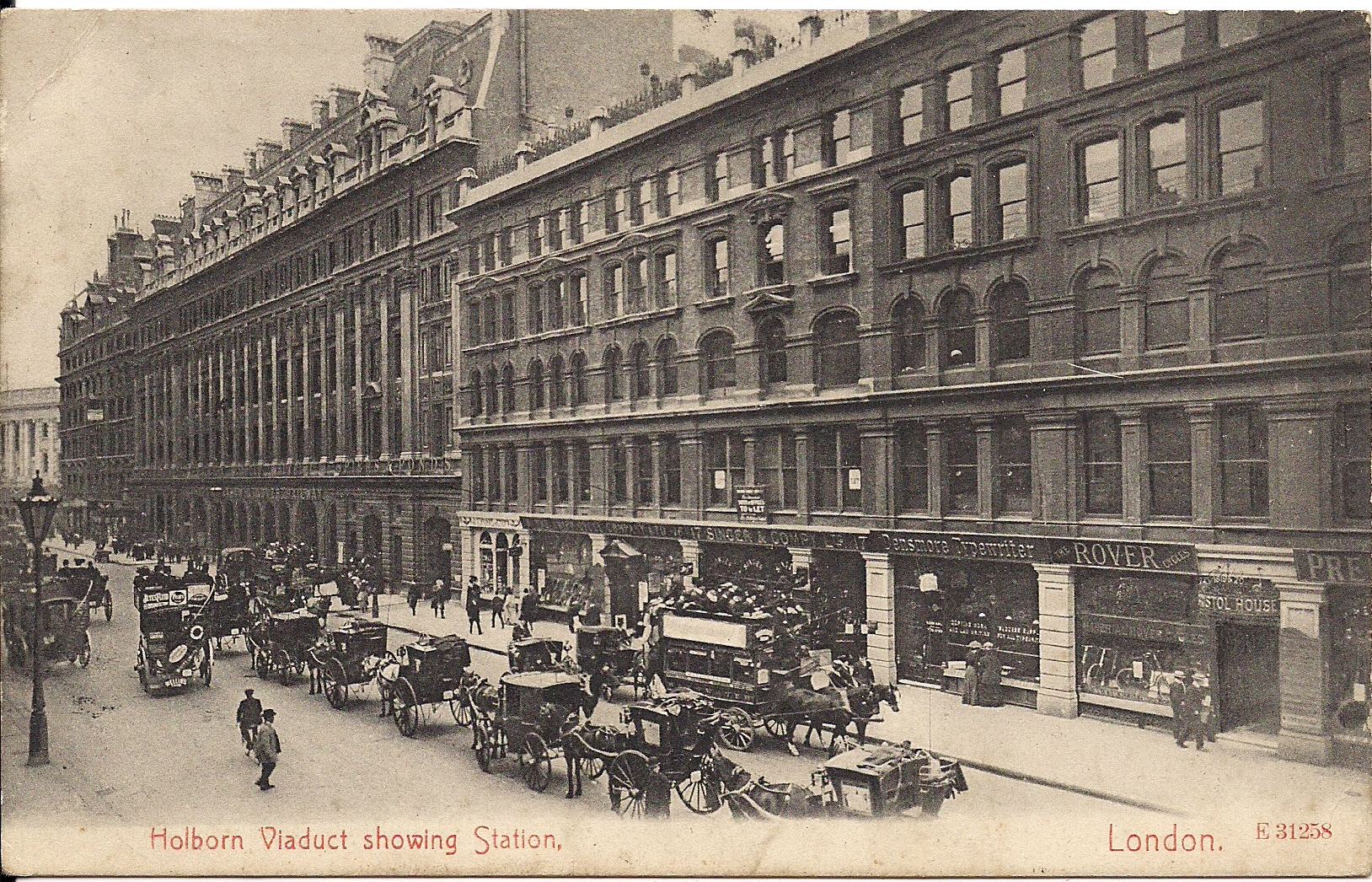
Holborn Viaduct station and hotel in 1908

The Holborn Viaduct Hotel was designed by Lewis H. Isaacs, and opened on 17 November 1877. It was so well-integrated with the station that it was difficult for the casual traveller in central London to spot the main entrance.

The hotel was run by the caterers Spiers & Pond, who were already co-operating with the LCDR, and became official caterers to the LSWR in 1888, and the SER the following year. J. Lyons and Co. took over operations in 1905. It was used for wireless communications during World War I.

== Reorganisation ==
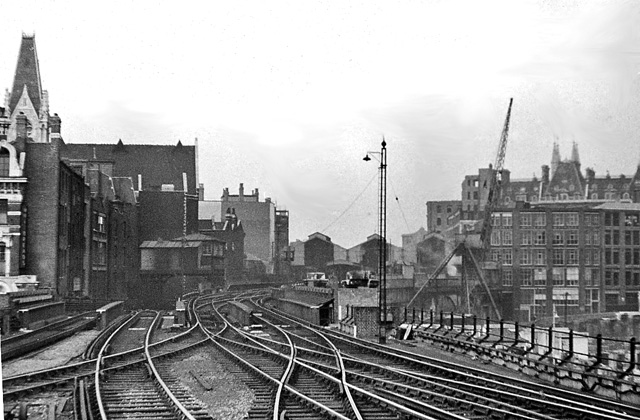
The approach to Holborn Viaduct in 1953

Passenger traffic through the Snow Hill Tunnel ceased on 3 April 1916, which saw the low-level platforms closed and Holborn Viaduct become a terminus for passenger services from the south of London into the City.

The station came under the control of the Southern Railway (SR) in the 1923 Grouping. On 21 March 1926, the signalling system at Holborn Viaduct was upgraded to use colour-light. The distance of just 660 yards (600 m) between Holborn Viaduct and St. Paul's station (now named Blackfriars) led to the intermediate station at Ludgate Hill being closed on 3 March 1929. The route was electrified in 1925 for services from Shortlands and Orpington, with the first service opening on 12 July. The line from Bickley to St Mary Cray was electrified in 1934, with an electric service between Holborn Viaduct and Sevenoaks starting the following year. Electric services to Gillingham began on 2 July 1939, which involved extending platform 1 to 520 feet (160 m). This extension caused problems with arrivals and departures, due to all the trains running in such a restricted space.

The station was not directly damaged by any action in World War II, but the hotel was hit by a bomb on 26 October and was then destroyed by fire overnight on 10–11 May 1941; the station was closed until 1 June as a result. A signal box to the south of the station, and a nearby bridge over Southwark Street, were destroyed by overnight bombing on 16–17 April 1941. A temporary replacement opened on 29 September, with a permanent arrangement opening on 9 October 1942.

== Post-nationalisation ==
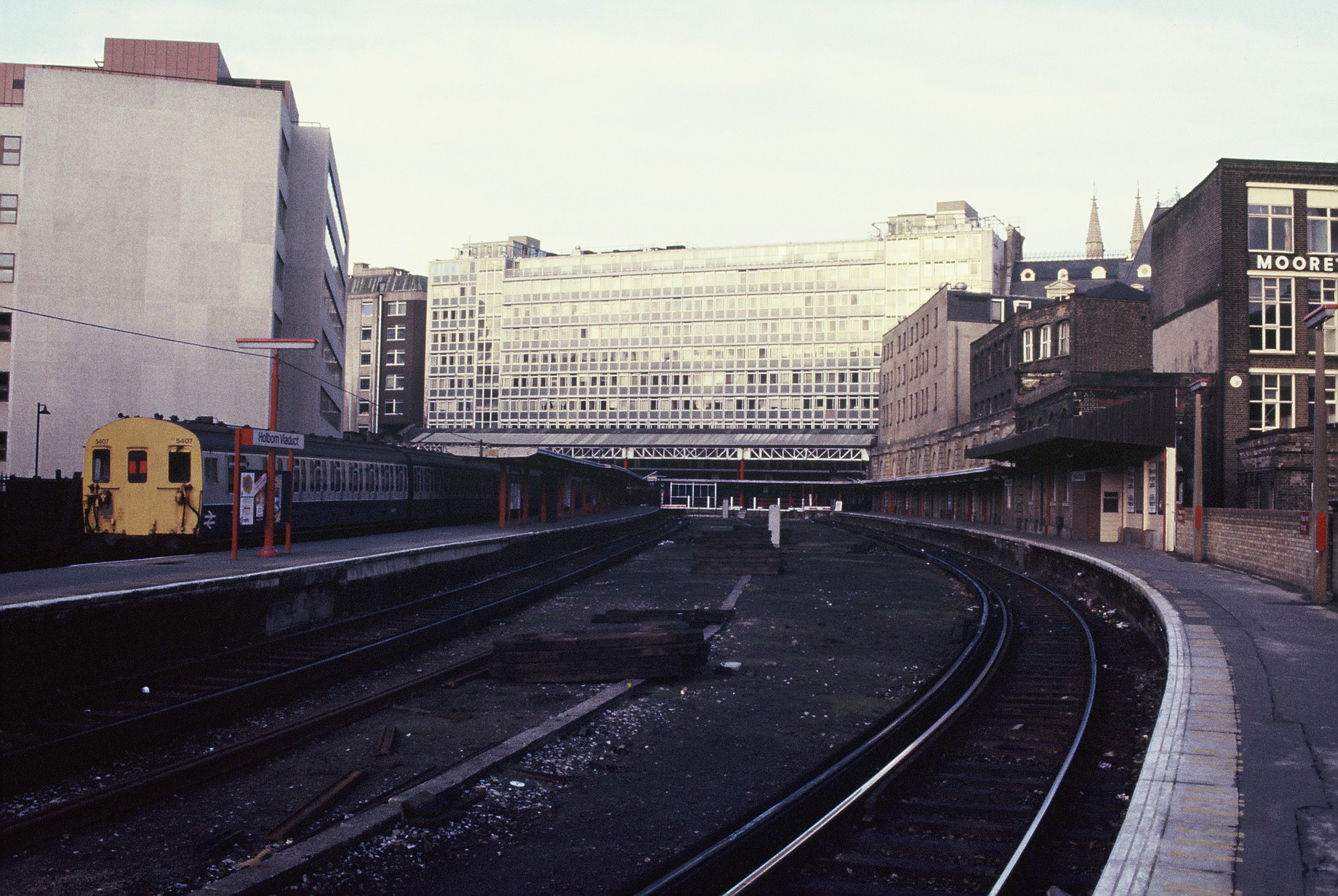
Holborn Viaduct's platforms in 1985

Following the war, services to Holborn Viaduct began to be withdrawn. The electrification of the Kent Coast route led to two basic services operating all day from the station: to Sevenoaks and West Croydon, with peak time services to a number of other destinations. The station was rebuilt between 1960 and 1963. In 1963, the hotel, which had been heavily damaged during the Blitz, was demolished and redeveloped, with a new ten-storey office building replacing it; t opened on 9 September. Two platforms were removed from the station in 1973, as services were reduced and parcel traffic stopped running. The station was closed on Saturdays after 2 May 1970, and after 7:30pm on weekdays from 1 June 1981. It remained popular for commuter services into the 1980s, serving over 22,000 passengers on 200 trains every day.

In 1984, British Rail proposed using Snow Hill Tunnel as a bypass for the station; driver-only trains would run from Blackfriars to Farringdon and then on to Kings Cross, allowing passengers to skip the change of trains at Holborn Viaduct. Holborn Viaduct station was temporarily closed on 18 August 1986, then reopened on 30 August.

== Closure ==
In 1988, Snow Hill Tunnel was restored and passenger trains began running through as a north–south rail link through central London. The Thameslink plan was to build a new underground station in the vicinity, to be called St. Paul's Thameslink. Its construction required the demolition of the bridge to Holborn Viaduct from Ludgate Hill.

The last train out of Holborn Viaduct was a special formed of two Class 411 units (8 CEP). It was an enthusiast special which started at Holborn Viaduct at 19:40 on 26 January 1990, and visited several London termini used at that time by Network SouthEast: Victoria, London Bridge and Cannon Street; it terminated at Charing Cross. Holborn Viaduct station was closed permanently by British Rail on 29 January 1990. The frontage of the station buildings was incorporated into the new Thameslink station, which formed part of a new development funded by a commercial property company.

== Services ==
Preceding station	Disused railways	Following station
Terminus	London, Chatham & Dover Railway	Ludgate Hill; Line and station closed
Terminus	Network SouthEast; City Line	Blackfriars; Line closed, station open

== See also ==
- List of closed railway stations in London
- Broad Street station
