= Ludgate Circus tube station =

Unbuilt London Underground station

Ludgate Circus
- Interactive map of Ludgate Circus

General information
- Location: Ludgate Hill
- Local authority: City of London

Railway companies
- Original company: London Underground

Other information
- Coordinates: 51°30′51″N 0°06′16″W

Ludgate Circus was a planned London Underground station that would have formed part of "phase 2" of the Fleet line (now called the Jubilee line) had it been completed. Taking its name from the nearby Ludgate Circus in the City of London financial district, preliminary preparation work was begun in the 1970s, but the plan was later postponed due to lack of funds.

When the Jubilee line was extended in the late 1990s, it took a different route south of the River Thames and the "phase 1" portion of the line from Green Park to Charing Cross was taken out of passenger use.

A National Rail station was eventually constructed near the Ludgate Circus site, but to serve the north–south Thameslink route, using the Snow Hill tunnel, rather than the originally envisaged east–west line. It used the previously redundant line that used to form the National Rail line terminating at Holborn Viaduct station. This station was not named Ludgate Circus, but rather St. Paul's Thameslink, later changed to City Thameslink to avoid confusion with the nearby St Paul's tube station. It was, however, built in such a way as to allow for an underground east–west aligned station to be easily integrated; this can be seen in the wide spaces at the Holborn end of the station, where large doors open on to a corridor intended to lead to escalators to an underground concourse level. It is still known today as the "LUL corridor" by staff.

== Future plans ==
As of 2015, there are no plans or suggestions to build an Underground station at Ludgate Circus. However, there are long-term proposals to build an extension of the Docklands Light Railway (DLR) from Bank to Charing Cross, with stations planned at Ludgate Circus and Aldwych.

Abandoned plans
Preceding station	London Underground	Following station
Aldwych towards Stanmore	Jubilee line Phase 2 (never constructed)	Cannon Street towards New Cross Gate or Lewisham
