= Camberwell railway station (England) =

Disused railway station in England

Camberwell
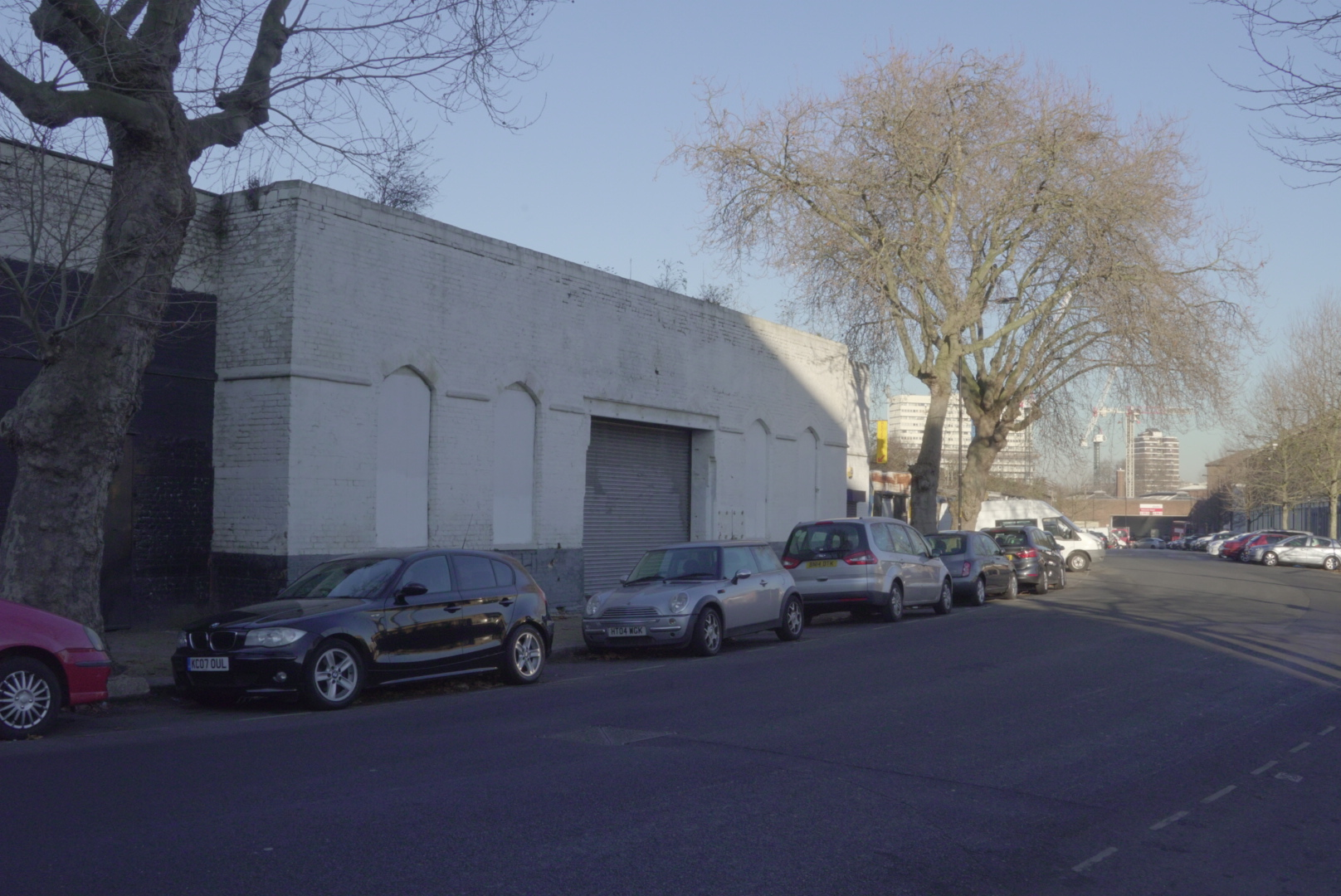
- The former station building in 2016
- Interactive map of Camberwell

General information
- Location: Camberwell
- Local authority: London Borough of Southwark
- Number of platforms: 4

Railway companies
- Original company: London, Chatham and Dover Railway

Key dates
- 6 October 1862: Opened
- 3 April 1916: Closed to passengers
- 18 April 1964: Closed to all traffic

Other information
- Coordinates: 51.4736°N 0.0977°W

Camberwell is a closed railway station in Camberwell, South London, England. It opened in 1862 but was closed to passengers in 1916 and closed to all traffic in 1964. The possibility of the station's re-opening has been raised in recent years.

== History ==
Camberwell station was opened on 6 October 1862 by the London, Chatham and Dover Railway (LC&DR) as part of the company's ambitious "City Branch" from Herne Hill to Blackfriars. It was constructed on a viaduct with entry at street level. On 1 May 1863 the name was changed to Camberwell New Road. The station initially had two facing platforms, but was expanded to four lines with the addition of a central island lines with the additional lines opening on 1 January 1866. The signal box built at the northern end of the island in the late 1890s is Grade II listed.

In 1879 the LCDR was running the following services that stopped at Camberwell:

- Frequent trains between Moorgate and Victoria, calling at all stations (Note: Trains called at Moorgate Street, Aldersgate Street, Snow Hill, Ludgate Hill, Blackfriars, Borough Road, Elephant and Castle, Walworth Road, Camberwell, Loughborough Junction, Brixton and South Stockwell, Clapham and North Stockwell, Wandsworth Road, Battersea Park Road, Grosvenor Road and Victoria)
- Half-hourly trains between Moorgate and Clapham Junction, calling at all stations (Note: Trains ran as for the Moorgate to Victoria service, calling only at Clapham Junction after Wandsworth Road.)
- Through trains from Kentish Town to Victoria, calling at all stations (Note: Trains called at Kentish Town, King's Cross (York Road), King's Cross (Metropolitan), Farringdon Street, Snow Hill then as for the Moorgate to Victoria service.)

The LCDR was part of the jointly managed South Eastern and Chatham Railway from 1899. In October 1908 the station name reverted to Camberwell. As with many other London stations during World War I, wartime restraints forced it to close to passenger traffic on 3 April 1916. Before the outbreak of war, the station had suffered dwindling passenger usage following the introduction of electric tram services in the area. It remained in use for goods traffic until 18 April 1964.

== Modern use ==
Today, the original station building located on the west side of Camberwell Station Road is in converted use as a mechanic's garage. At track level, nothing of the two side platforms remain but small fragments of the degraded island platform are still visible. The goods yard is now occupied by a residential development.

Camberwell station was mentioned in the 1956 film Private's Progress as a good place to get off a train and avoid paying a fare. It was made to sound like a working station, despite the fact that it had closed nearly 40 years before the film was set.

== Possible re-opening ==
The station was considered by British Rail for reopening as part of the Thameslink route in the 1980s, along with Southwark Park and Walworth Road.

In 2002, a study undertaken by a rail expert, Nick Alexander, concluded that a "station located at the old Camberwell station site should be considered if the option were to be considered in future".

In June 2014, Transport for London (TfL) commissioned Steer Davies Gleave to undertake a feasibility study to consider the possibility of re-opening Camberwell and Walworth railway stations on the line where trains run non-stop between Loughborough Junction or Denmark Hill and Elephant & Castle. The study concluded that a re-opened Camberwell station could cater for 8- or 12-car trains, but that complete reconstruction might be required. The cost of a 12-car station would be £27.5m (£20.7m cheaper than Walworth). 40% of the cost was the cost of rebuilding four bridges.

In December 2015, TfL announced that its proposed Bakerloo line extension would follow a route via the Old Kent Road to Lewisham, rather than through a new underground station in Camberwell and Peckham to the same destination. In March 2016, it was reported that Mayor of London Boris Johnson understood the Bakerloo line extension did not solve Camberwell's poor rail connectivity, adding that TfL were investigating the re-opening of Camberwell railway station in consultation with stakeholders, including the London Borough of Southwark and the London Borough of Lambeth, and that initial feasibility studies indicate it would be possible to construct a modern station on the site if timetables could be modified to accommodate Camberwell as an additional stop.

In June 2017, Steer Davies Gleave produced a TfL-commissioned report discussing the possibility of the station's re-opening in 2026 in three future land use densities across three levels of operational use (four 8-car trains per hour, six 8-car trains per hour and six 12-car trains per hour) to give a total of nine scenarios. It estimated the capital cost of an 8-car station at £36.74m and a 12-car station at £38.50m. Its transport user analysis concluded that no scenario produced a net benefit, because Camberwell station users' journey time benefit would be more than offset by those travelling into London from further afield. It also concluded the wider economic impact would be negative and that the increase to land value in the area would be modest. SDG's journey time benefit analysis was based on a Mott MacDonald report that reached similar conclusions, but that the journey time cost would be unlikely to be noticed by users, and that the overall impact of the opening of the station would be minimal.

The Labour Party included a promise to campaign for the station's re-opening in its manifesto ahead of the 2018 Southwark London Borough Council election held in May.

In September 2018, TfL published a strategic business case to explore the station's reinstatement. It acknowledged the area's poor transport connectivity and that the reopening of the National Rail station was the best of eight options examined. While it concluded the local area would benefit from the station's re-opening, its conclusions were similar to Steer Davies Gleave's 2017 report.

In July 2020, the station was included in a shortlist of stations under consideration for reopening as part of the third round of the New Stations Fund scheme, but ultimately was not successful.

== See also ==
- Bakerloo line extension to Camberwell

== Notes ==
Preceding station	Disused railways	Following station
Walworth Road; Line open, station closed	London, Chatham & Dover Railway; City Branch	Loughborough Junction; Line and station open
