= City Thameslink railway station =

Central London railway station

City Thameslink
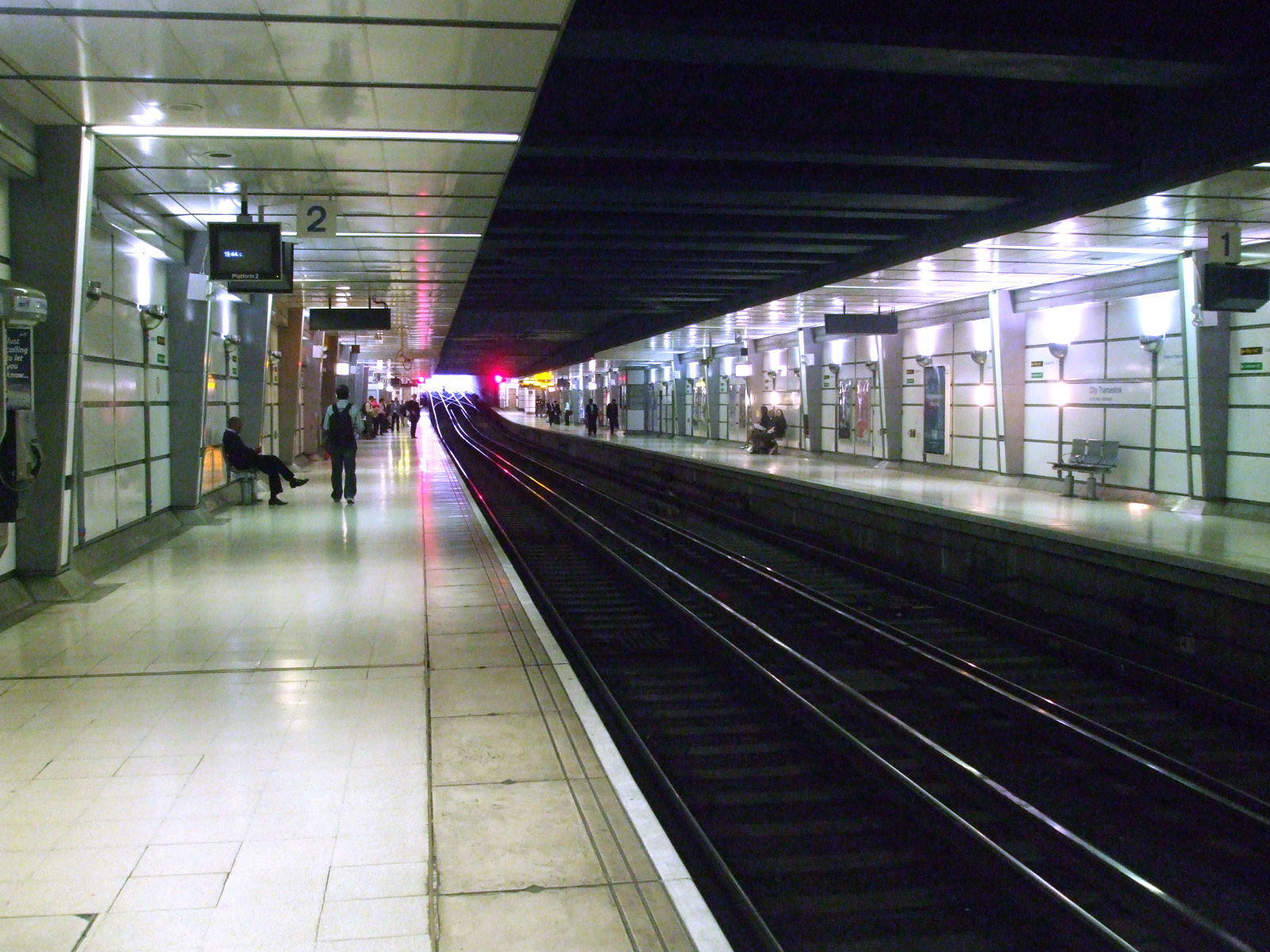
- Looking south from the station
- Interactive map of City Thameslink

General information
- Location: Holborn Viaduct / Ludgate Hill
- Local authority: City of London
- Managed by: Thameslink
- Owner: Network Rail
- Station code: CTK
- DfT category: C1
- Number of platforms: 2
- Accessible: Yes
- Fare zone: 1

National Rail annual entry and exit
- 2020–21: ▼0.974 million
- Interchange: ▼12
- 2021–22: ▲2.995 million
- Interchange: ▲37
- 2022–23: ▲6.439 million
- Interchange: ▲1,984
- 2023–24: ▲7.040 million
- Interchange: ▲0.286 million
- 2024–25: ▲7.636 million
- Interchange: ▲0.298 million

Key dates
- 29 May 1990: Opened as St. Paul's Thameslink
- 30 September 1991: Renamed City Thameslink

Other information
- External links: Departures; Facilities
- Coordinates: 51.5163°N 0.1037°W

City Thameslink (/ˈtɛmz.lɪŋk/, TEMZ-link) is a central London railway station within the City of London, with entrances on Ludgate Hill and Holborn Viaduct. The station is on the Thameslink route between Blackfriars to the south and Farringdon to the north.

The station opened in 1990 to replace Holborn Viaduct railway station. It was part of the Thameslink project that re-opened the Snow Hill Tunnel to provide a continuous north–south route across London. Originally named St. Paul's Thameslink, it was renamed City Thameslink the following year to avoid confusion with the nearby St Paul's tube station on the Central line (note that out-of-station interchange discount does not apply for changing between these two stations). The station was refurbished in 2010–11 to increase capacity, and the timetable was revised in 2018 with the introduction of automatic signalling.

== Name and location ==
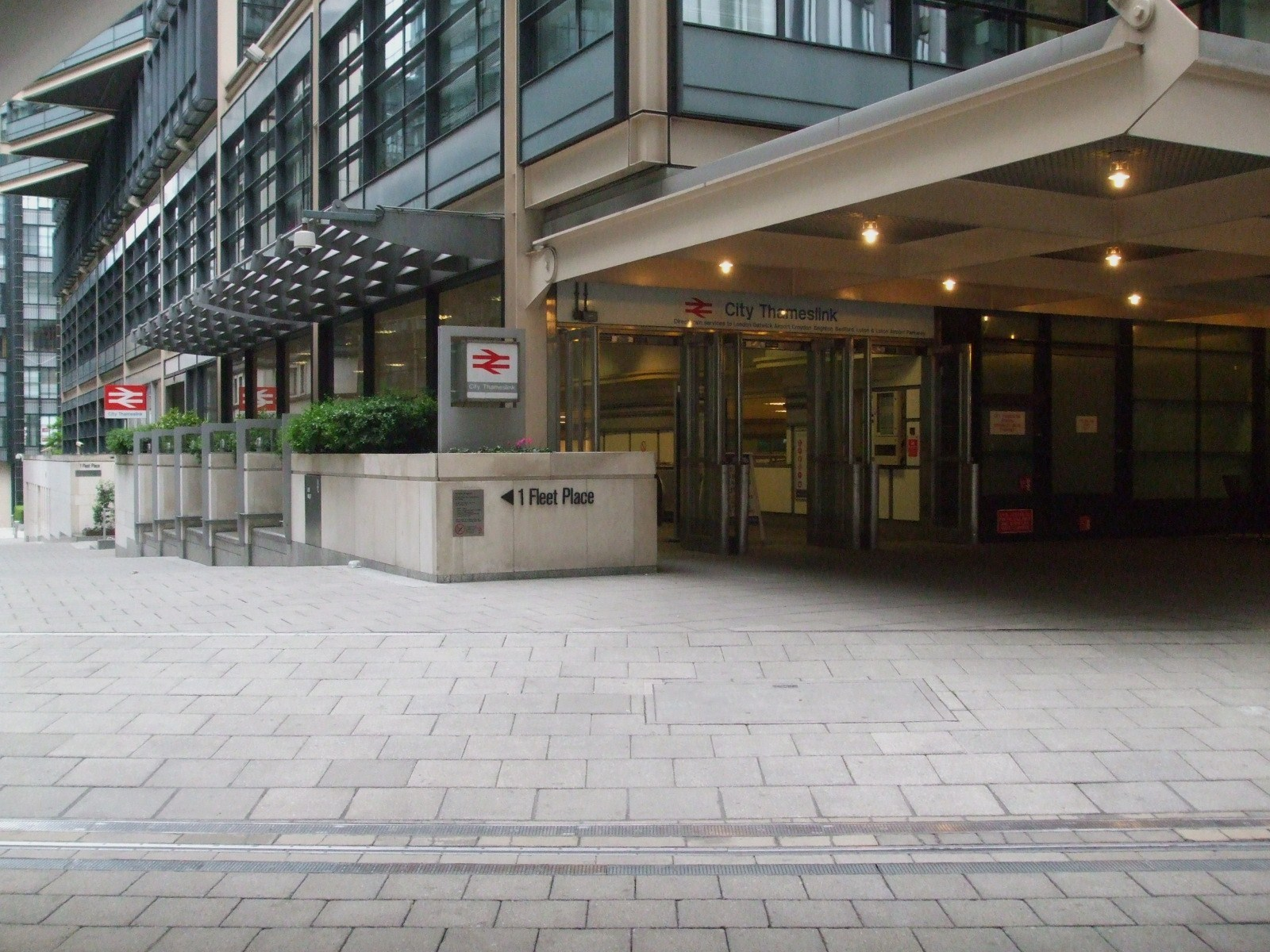
Northern entrance on Holborn Viaduct

The station is near the western edge of the City of London, close to its border with the City of Westminster. It has two entrances, one on Ludgate Hill and another on Holborn Viaduct, both of which access the two platforms. It is one of the few main line stations in central London that does not have an interchange with the London Underground; it is roughly equidistant from Chancery Lane and St Paul's on the Central line. A planned Tube station in the immediate area, to be named Ludgate Circus, was ultimately never built.

Although City Thameslink is a through station, for ticketing purposes it is classed as a London terminus for Thameslink services to and from the south; for services from the north it is a Thameslink Terminal station, which is a different fare. It is in London fare zone 1 and one of the "core stations" on the Thameslink route, along with St Pancras, Farringdon and Blackfriars. The name has come in for criticism as being uninspiring, as well as misleading to visitors, as, although it is in the City, it is at the western edge of the City, about 1 mi (1.6 km) west of the financial district.

London Buses routes 8, 15, 17, 25, 26, 40, 46, 59, 63, 76, 133, 341 and night routes N8, N15, N21, N25, N26, N63, N199, N242, N550 and N551 serve the station.

== History ==
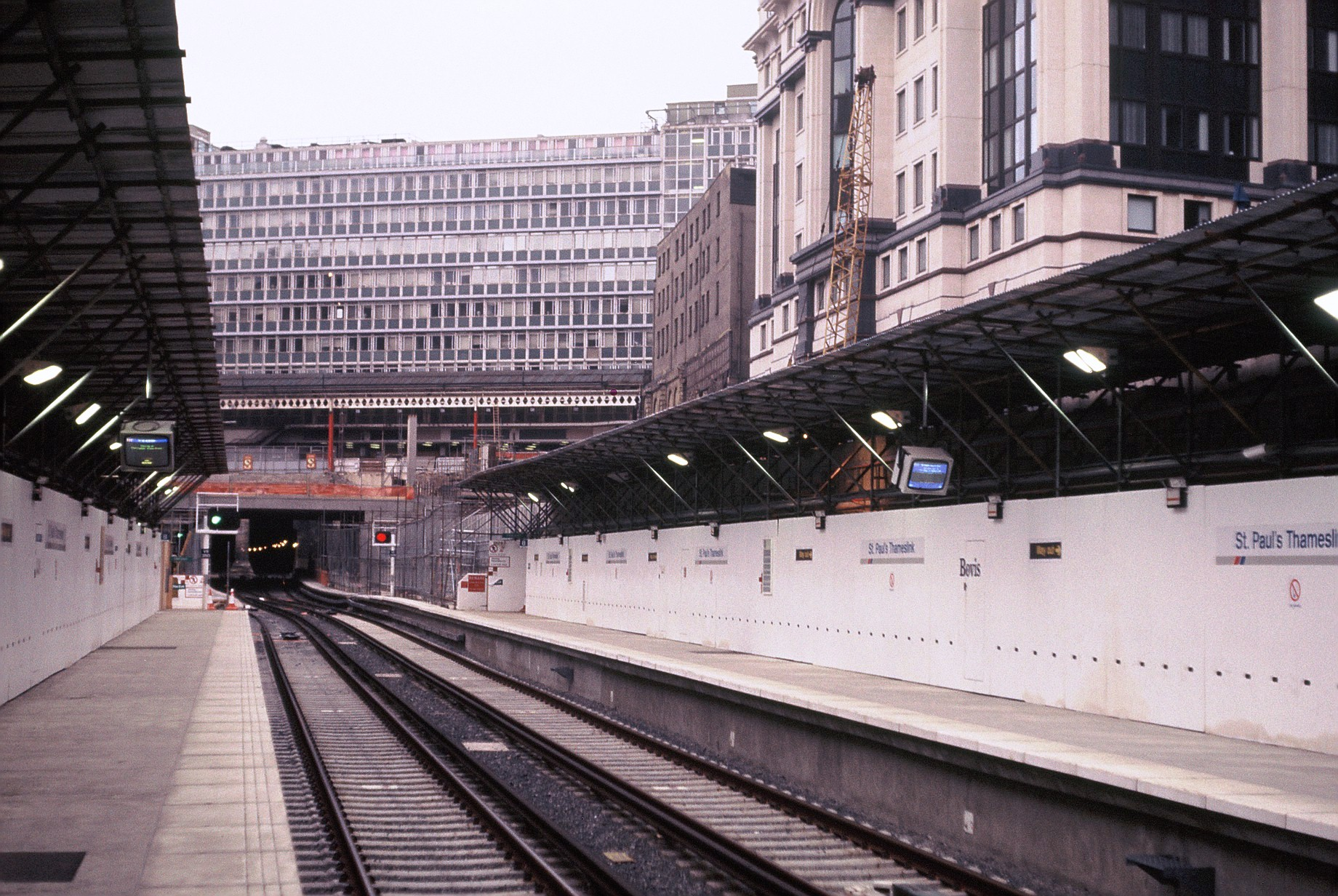
St Paul's Thameslink station shortly after opening, with the remains of Holborn Viaduct railway station in the background

=== Opening ===
The Thameslink line opened in 1988 after the Snow Hill tunnel, closed to passengers since 1916, was re-opened to provide a through route to Farringdon and King's Cross from South London. Initially, trains used the approach viaduct for the now-closed Holborn Viaduct station. The new service was an immediate financial success, and it was decided to redevelop the Holborn Viaduct site with a new station and business complex. The work was part-financed by the London property developer Rosehaugh Stanhope.

When Holborn Viaduct station closed, a new line between Blackfriars and the tunnel was constructed on a different alignment slightly to the east and at a lower elevation, providing the opportunity to build 600,000 square feet (56,000 m^{2}) of office space above the new station on a 4-acre (1.6 ha) site. City Thameslink was built to replace Holborn Viaduct station and is partly on the site of the old station. The total cost was estimated at £360–£450 million. Because of a proposed routing for the second phase of the Jubilee line through the area, part of the station was built to allow for a future interchange.

Holborn Viaduct closed on 26 January 1990. The following May, all Thameslink services were suspended for 17 days so that demolition work could be carried out.

The station was opened by British Rail on 29 May 1990 as St. Paul's Thameslink, and was renamed as City Thameslink on 30 September 1991 to avoid confusion with the St Paul's station on the London Underground Central line (which is several hundred yards to the east, to the north of St Paul's Cathedral). The station was officially opened by the Lord Mayor of London Sir Alexander Graham on 6 November 1991. It was the first mainline station built in central London in almost 100 years. The station was designed by SAS International, who designed the original walls and panelling.

In conjunction with construction of the new station, the area around the old Holborn Viaduct and Ludgate Hill stations was redeveloped, and an old bridge across Ludgate Hill was removed. In 1992, following the demolition, an additional service tunnel was constructed connecting City Thameslink to Farringdon.

When the Thameslink franchise was awarded to First Capital Connect (FCC) in 2006, the Thameslink service was re-branded but City Thameslink was not renamed. By late 2010, FCC had reverted to the Thameslink name.

=== Recent events ===
As part of the Thameslink Programme, an upgrade of City Thameslink station was completed in 2010. The upgrade was important because the closure of Blackfriars later in the year would lead to increased footfall. The platforms were made ready for future 12-carriage trains, and the passenger information system improved. New lighting, ticket gates and CCTV cameras were installed, and the service announcement system was upgraded to provide more accurate train times. SAS retrofitted the station interior, as they had done for the original 1990 construction, with enamel wall panels that fitted the original design specification.

In a 2014 report, London TravelWatch suggested an underground passageway linking City Thameslink to St Paul's tube station to provide an interchange with the Central line that would benefit passengers travelling from the Central line catchment to Gatwick and Luton Airports.

In 2018, Govia Thameslink Railway announced a major timetable change, which was implemented that May. The changes included a half-hour service across Central London, connecting City Thameslink with Gatwick Airport and Luton Airport Parkway. The signalling was upgraded to support automatic train operation through the station, along with the rest of the core Thameslink route, and British Rail Class 700 trains were introduced into the service. The following January, several evening services from City Thameslink to St Albans and Harpenden were reinstated, after a six-month absence.

In 2026, it was announced that the station will be temporarily closed for seven months from May 2027, to replace the ten escalators at the station which have been in service for 35 years.

== Services ==
City Thameslink is served by trains operated by Thameslink on the Thameslink Route which run Monday-Saturday only, with the station being closed on Sundays. Train services are operated using Class 700 Desiro City EMUs.

The typical off-peak service in trains per hour is:

- 4 tph to Brighton via Gatwick Airport
- 2 tph to Horsham via Redhill and Gatwick Airport
- 2 tph to Three Bridges via Redhill
- 2 tph to Rainham via Greenwich, Woolwich Arsenal, Dartford and Gravesend
- 4 tph to Sutton (two of these run via Mitcham Junction and two run via Wimbledon)
- 4 tph to St Albans City (all stations)
- 2 tph to Luton (all stations except Kentish Town, Cricklewood and Hendon)
- 4 tph to Bedford (semi-fast)
- 2 tph to Cambridge via Stevenage
- 2 tph to Peterborough via Stevenage

Preceding station	National Rail	Following station
Farringdon	Thameslink Thameslink Monday-Saturday only	London Blackfriars

City Thameslink serves as the lost property office of the Thameslink line. A fee is charged for retrieving property.
