= Herne Hill railway station =

Railway station in Lambeth, South London, England

Herne Hill
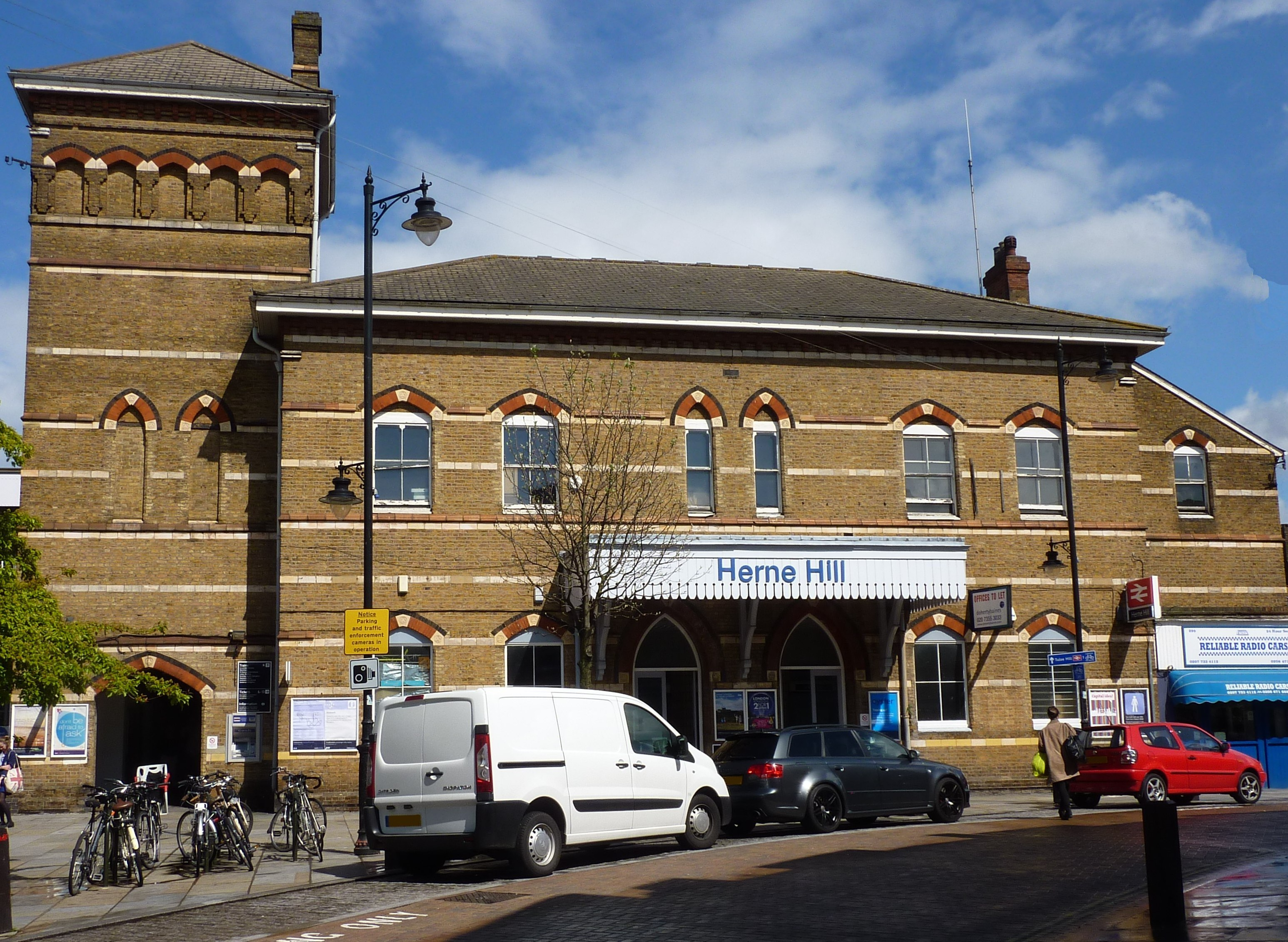
- The station building in 2012
- Interactive map of Herne Hill

General information
- Location: Herne Hill
- Local authority: London Borough of Lambeth
- Grid reference: TQ319744
- Managed by: Southeastern
- Station code: HNH
- DfT category: C2
- Number of platforms: 4
- Accessible: Yes
- Fare zone: 2 and 3

National Rail annual entry and exit
- 2020–21: ▼0.745 million
- Interchange: ▼0.259 million
- 2021–22: ▲1.607 million
- Interchange: ▲0.581 million
- 2022–23: ▲2.004 million
- Interchange: ▲0.843 million
- 2023–24: ▲2.279 million
- Interchange: ▲1.057 million
- 2024–25: ▲2.434 million
- Interchange: ▼1.029 million

Railway companies
- Original company: London, Chatham and Dover Railway
- Pre-grouping: South Eastern and Chatham Railway
- Post-grouping: Southern Railway

Key dates
- 25 August 1862: Opened

Listed status
- Listed feature: Herne Hill Railway Station (Entrance Block Only)
- Listing grade: Grade II listed
- Entry number: 1376144
- Added to list: 20 August 1998

Other information
- External links: Departures; Facilities
- Coordinates: 51.453°N 0.102°W

Herne Hill (/hɜːrn hɪl/) is a railway station in the Herne Hill district of the London Borough of Lambeth in South London. Situated 3 miles 76 chains (6.4 km) down the line from London Victoria, it is a major junction between the Chatham Main Line, on which it is between Brixton and West Dulwich, and Thameslink, where it is between Loughborough Junction and Tulse Hill. The station is served by Thameslink services between St Albans City and Sutton and Southeastern services between London Victoria and Orpington, with extra services during the peak hours. It is located within London fare zones 2 and 3.

Herne Hill station was first opened on 25 August 1862 by the London, Chatham and Dover Railway (LCDR) as the southern terminus of the line to London Victoria, which opened on the same date. It became a through-station on 1 July 1863 when services began continuing to Beckenham Junction, and the same month trains were continuing down the LCDR to Dover, where passengers could transfer to a ferry to Calais. By this time, the City Branch had already opened, and when the Snow Hill tunnel opened services could continue through Central London, with the Great Northern Railway running services from Hatfield in Hertfordshire to Herne Hill between 1866 and 1868.

By 1869 the London and South Western Railway (LSWR) had built their railway to Tulse Hill and a connection to Herne Hill which allowed them to use services via the station to connect to Central London. From 1885 the Herne Hill Sidings were built as a marshalling yard for goods trains heading for Blackfriars, one of the first yards of its kind in the United Kingdom. From 1899 the LCDR and South Eastern Railway operated services jointly as the South Eastern and Chatham Railway, before being amalgamated alongside other companies into the Southern Railway (SR) from 1923. The SR electrified the line through Herne Hill, first with overhead wires in 1925 and then with the third-rail system instead from 1926. Colour-light signalling replaced semaphores as part of a wider regional upgrade in 1959.

The sidings at the station were closed in 1966, but restored in 2009 as part of the Thameslink Programme when the end of Thameslink services to Moorgate created the need for extra sidings. Other upgrades, such as the provision of step-free access, were implemented in the late 2000s. The flat junctions on either side of the station create a major capacity constraint, and the grade separation of the station has been discussed, including as part of the Thameslink Programme, but it has never materialised. Proposals to extend the London Overground and London Underground to the station have also been considered but not pursued by Transport for London.

== Design ==
=== Station design ===
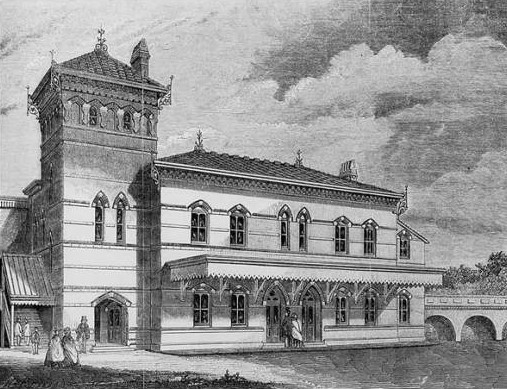
The station building illustrated in The Building News.

The station was designed by architect John Taylor and railway engineers Joseph Cubitt and J.T. Turner, and was built in Gothic Revival and polychrome styles. The station was designed to impress its passengers, with tea rooms offering buffets, decorative brickwork, and a tower which also served the practical function of concealing the water tank for the steam locomotives. The station made use of London stock brick and was in a style that became known as "Chatham Gothic" because of its use by the London, Chatham, and Dover Railway (LCDR) in the local area.

The design of the station was highly praised at the time: in 1863, The Building News described it as "spacious and convenient [...] and of the very best quality", and wrote that "an unusual amount of decorative taste has been displayed" in the station's construction. The neighbouring viaduct was praised as "one of the most ornamental pieces of work we have ever seen attempted on a railway" for its fine brickwork. The station's design prompted the journal to write a 2,000-word editorial bemoaning the comparatively poor architectural quality of other contemporaneous civil engineering projects. An architectural critic later noted the station was "eulogised" by journals upon its opening and that its architecture was still seen as exemplary at the end of the 19th century.

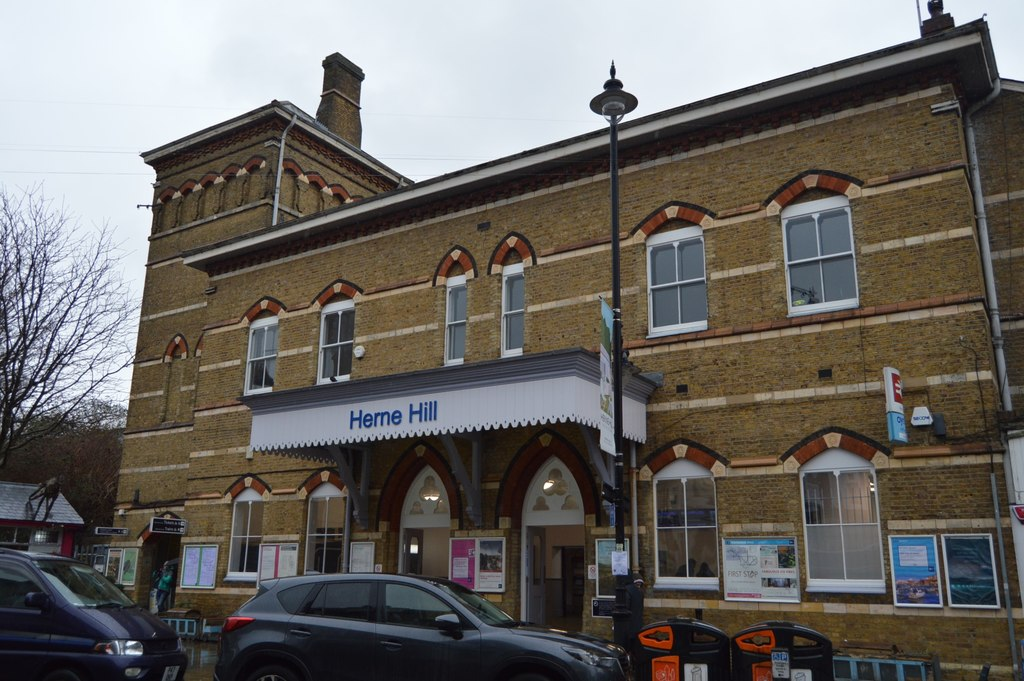
The station with its renovated canopy in 2018

The upper floor of the station, which had not been used by passengers since 1925, was converted into 3,000 square feet (278.7 m^{2}) of office space in 1991 and rented as 'Tower House' (after the station's distinctive tower). The station building houses a ticket office and newsagent, and it was made a Grade II listed structure in 1998; the listing notes the station's arched doorways, Welsh slate roof—which replaced the original clay roof tiles—and decorative brickwork. The viaduct and station together were described by Cherry and Pevsner as a "handsome group", and featured on the cover of a book about London's railway architecture.

The station entrance canopy was shortened and altered in the mid-20th century. It was then removed and replaced by Network Rail due to its being in a state of disrepair; the new canopy has a timber valance design and cornice based on the original LCDR canopy, as opposed to the reduced 20th century version. In 2019, a room on the first floor of the station building, which formerly served as the waiting room, was renovated and opened as a public space with funding from the Mayor of London.

=== Track layout ===
The Chatham Main Line and Sutton Loop railway lines through Herne Hill are elevated above road level on a brick viaduct that runs north–south. The four tracks are served by two island platforms, the westerly platform numbered 1 and 2 and the easterly platform numbered 3 and 4; northbound trains call at platforms 1/2 and southbound trains at 3/4, providing cross-platform interchange between the two routes. The speed limit through the station is 20 miles per hour (32 km/h) on platform 1 and 60 mph (97 km/h) on platforms 2–4, but upon passing all four platforms the speed limit immediately lowers due to the junctions either side.

There are flat junctions at each end of the station: Herne Hill North Junction, where the lines to Loughborough Junction and Brixton diverge; and Herne Hill South Junction, where the lines to West Dulwich and Tulse Hill diverge. Thameslink and Southeastern services cross each other's paths at the junctions, constraining capacity on both routes. The station also has a turnback siding on its eastern side, adjacent to Milkwood Road; trains using this siding can only access the branch to Loughborough Junction..

== History ==
=== 1852–1862: Background and construction ===
The first proposal for a railway line through Herne Hill was drawn up in 1852 by the Mid Kent and London and South Western Junction Railways Company. No construction work was ever undertaken and the company had ceased to exist by 1860. In the late 1850s, the East Kent Railway (EKR) had ambitions to run passenger trains between Kent and London, but it did not own any railway lines in inner London. It reached an agreement with the London, Brighton and South Coast Railway (LB&SCR) in 1858, in which the EKR would use the LB&SCR's West End and Crystal Palace line to access Battersea and from 1860, its planned terminus at London Victoria. This arrangement incurred the EKR costly access fees, but was necessary because the company had no Parliamentary authority to build in London.

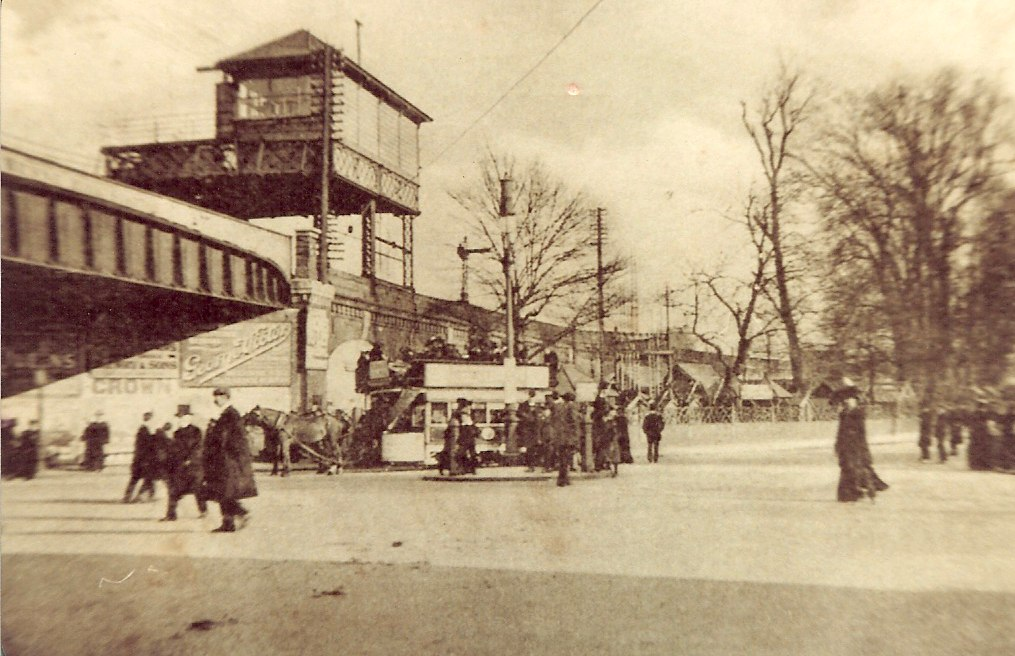
The original signalbox, elevated from the road to the viaduct

On 6 August 1860, the Metropolitan Extensions Act granted the EKR's successor—the London, Chatham and Dover Railway (LCDR)—the powers to build a line from Herne Hill to Farringdon; as well as this 4-mile-32-chain (7.1-kilometre) line, branches to Beckenham Junction (4 mi 21 ch, 6.9 km) and to Battersea (2 mi 65 ch, 4.5 km), the latter of which allowed connection with the planned terminus at London Victoria—were permitted. The route from Beckenham Junction to Battersea closely resembled that of the 1852 proposal, going via Clapham, Brixton, Herne Hill, Dulwich and Sydenham. The land for the station at Herne Hill was compulsorily purchased from the estate of Thomas Vyse, a manufacturer of straw hats and owner of Herne Hill Abbey, an estate at 70 Herne Hill; the station and much of the viaduct were then built on part of the Abbey's grounds.

To coincide with the delayed opening of its grand terminus at London Victoria, the section of line from Herne Hill via Stewarts Lane and Brixton opened on 25 August 1862, with Herne Hill opening on the same date. A new road, named Station Road, was built between the junction of Norwood Road and Half Moon Lane, Herne Hill's main thoroughfare, and the station. There were initially only two platforms, one for each direction of travel. The station's original signal box was situated at the road junction between Norwood Road and Half Moon Lane, and was elevated to the height of the viaduct.

=== 1863–1869: Early operation ===
The line from Beckenham Junction reached Herne Hill from the south on 1 July 1863, connecting the station to the LCDR's lines in Kent, and finally allowing the LCDR to avoid using the LB&SCR's tracks to access Victoria from Kent. From July 1863, LCDR trains between Victoria and Kent ran through Herne Hill, and continued to continental Europe via a connecting steamboat from Dover Harbour to Calais; these boat trains left Victoria and Ludgate Hill simultaneously and were joined at Herne Hill. Express journeys from Herne Hill to Dover, a distance of 74 miles (119.1 km), took 1 hour 36 minutes, at an average speed of 46.25 miles per hour (74.4 km/h). London-bound services doubled—and southbound services halved—in length at Herne Hill, which meant that more capacity could be added for the London section that was not needed further down the line.

In 1865, the LCDR developed a proposal for a line from Herne Hill to nearby Epsom; however, the LB&SCR had bought the line between Sutton and Epsom Downs the same year and were running through trains, so the LCDR had to give up on the idea. On 6 October 1862, the City Branch opened from Herne Hill as far as Elephant & Castle, via Camberwell and Walworth Road; the line reached Blackfriars on 1 June 1864, and the LCDR began operating direct services to King's Cross and Barnet (now High Barnet Underground station) from Herne Hill when the Snow Hill tunnel opened. As the Blackfriars Goods Depot was too small to handle the LCDR's traffic, a marshalling yard was built between Herne Hill and Loughborough Junction in order to put together the trains that would then be processed further up the line at Blackfriars; Roger Kidner questions whether these sidings were the first of their kind to be built, with Henry Patrick White calling them "one of the first of such yards in the country".

From 27 February 1865, the LCDR ran a workmen's train, whose tickets cost 1d per journey (equivalent to £0.45 in 2025), which ran twice daily between Ludgate Hill and Victoria via Herne Hill. The train left Ludgate Hill at 04:55 and arrived at Victoria around 06:00, and then left Victoria at 18:15. The LCDR were forced to run the service by clause 142 of the Metropolitan Extensions Act of 1860 that had let them build the line from Herne Hill in the first place, because Parliament thought that the construction of the line would displace a large number of people from the Camberwell area and that they ought to be considered; the LCDR's shareholders argued whether the moral bonus of being the operator of such a service outweighed the financial cost of its losses.

The Great Northern Railway (GNR) had contributed £320,000 to the Metropolitan Extensions (equivalent to £33,600,000 in 2025), and the London and South Western Railway (LSWR) had contributed £310,000 (equivalent to £32,600,000 in 2025); they had done this in return for the right to use the City Line themselves to run services. The GNR ran trains between Hatfield and Herne Hill from August 1866 until 1 March 1868, when those trains instead began running to Victoria via the new curve at Loughborough Junction. The service was busy, with 15 trains leaving Hatfield and 14 leaving Herne Hill every day, and the train calling at all stations.

In 1866, the South London line, a work of the LB&SCR between London Bridge and Herne Hill, which they then immediately quadrupled between Herne Hill and Battersea Park. The company then opened their suburban line from Peckham Rye to Sutton via Tulse Hill in 1868; this made a connection between Tulse Hill and Herne Hill necessary, for which a 1-mile (1.6 km) spur opened on 1 January 1869. Once the spur had been built, the LSWR could use their running rights to begin services between Ludgate Hill and Wimbledon via Herne Hill; some of these services went as far as Kingston until the mid-1890s.

=== 1870–1923: Expansion ===
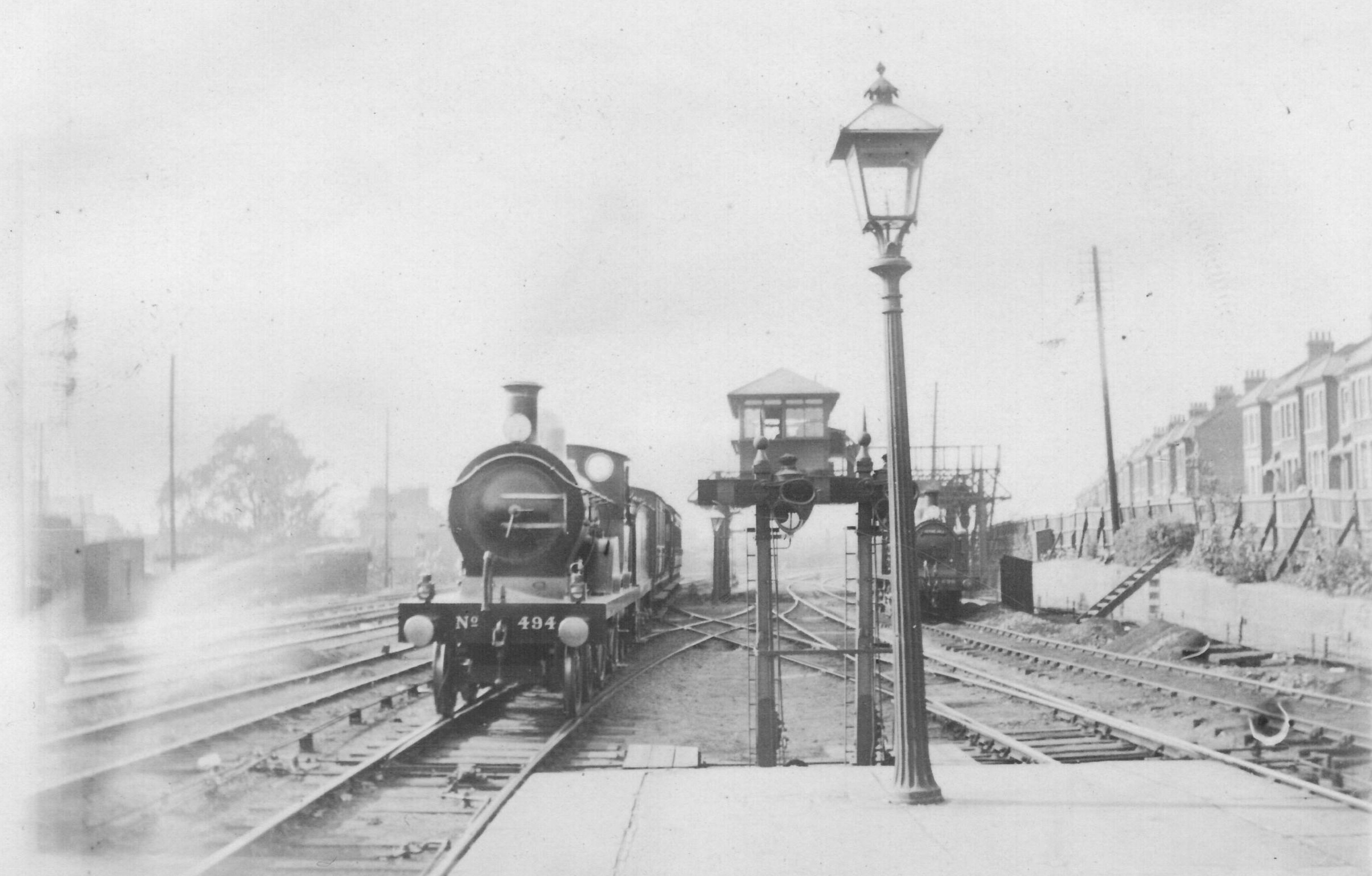
A train approaches in 1905

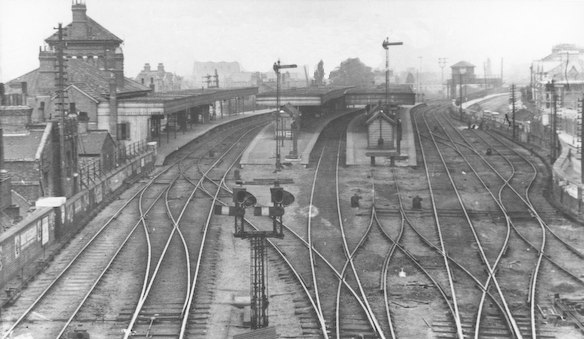
The track layout c. 1900

By 1870, a track had been added to the east of the station and two sidings had been added to the west; one of the western sidings was a bay platform for passenger trains, which was accessed from the platform adjoining the upper floor. Interlocking signalling was in use at Herne Hill by 1880. The LCDR enlarged the station in 1884 to meet growing demand: the viaduct was widened to allow for the construction of a second island platform and two lines to the east, of which the easternmost line was used only for freight. The foot tunnel under the viaduct was opened at the same time.

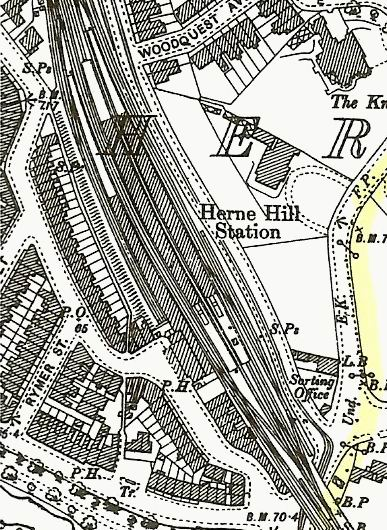
An 1894 Ordnance Survey map showing the station's layout

In 1885, the LCDR decided to convert Blackfriars Bridge railway station into a goods yard but lacked the space to sort wagons at the site. It purchased 14 acres (5.7 ha) of land between Herne Hill and Loughborough Junction for this purpose. The Herne Hill Sorting Sidings had some 35 sidings, the longest of which was 940 feet (286.5 m). A stationmaster's house was built at 239 Railton Road in the mid-1880s as the site offered a good view of the station; it is now a privately-owned budling. In 1888, Railton Road was extended to the junction of Norwood Road and Half Moon Lane, hence Station Road ceased to exist. By this point, Herne Hill was the southern terminus of some of the 100 trains using the Snow Hill tunnel and the City Line.

On 1 January 1899, the LCDR and the neighbouring South Eastern Railway (SER) formed a working union for their operations, which they called the South Eastern and Chatham Railway (SECR). The profits would be split as 41% for the LCDR and 59% for the SER, but the board would comprise four people from each company. In 1910, a late-night service began departing from Ludgate Hill at 01:15, which travelled to Beckenham Junction via Herne Hill. The intent was to satisfy journalists on Fleet Street who regularly complained in print about the poor quality of service on the line; those working on the morning papers often worked beyond midnight and would then miss the last train. Services to Farringdon from Herne Hill were discontinued in 1916 with the closure of the Snow Hill tunnel to passengers, and trains from the south instead terminated at Holborn Viaduct.

=== 1924–1987: Modernisation ===
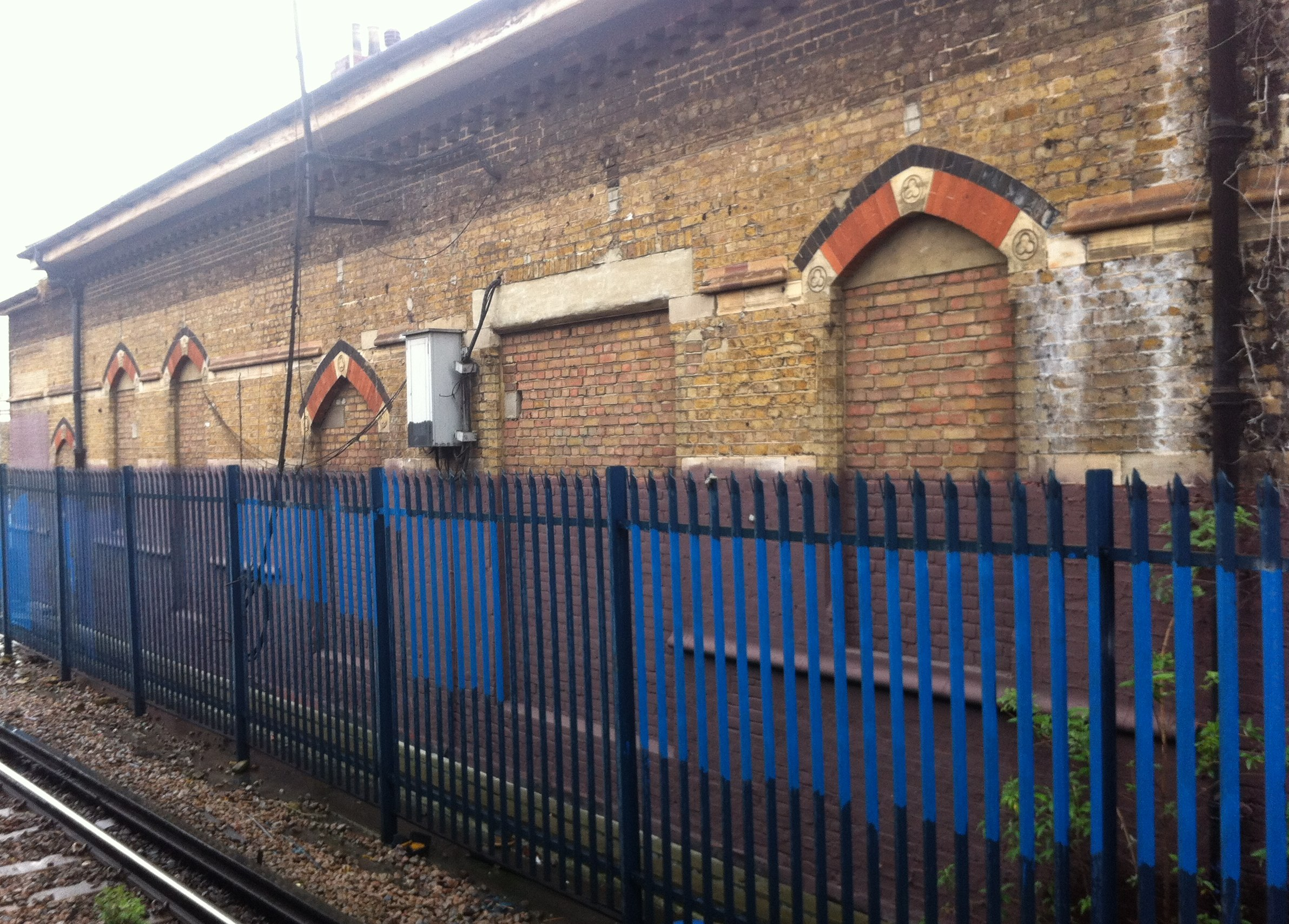
The sealed entrances and windows of the station's upper floor

On 1 January 1923, the LCDR, LB&SCR, SER, and several other railways amalgamated together to form the Southern Railway (SR). Work began on electrifying the former LCDR suburban routes in 1924. Herne Hill station was extensively remodelled as part of these works: the eastern island platform was lengthened; the original island platform was demolished and replaced by one further west, allowing two tracks to be laid between the island platforms; the western sidings were removed; and the upper floor was closed to passengers. From 12 July 1925, the SR began laying overhead wires from Victoria to Orpington via Herne Hill, with services beginning on 28 February 1926. However, it was announced on 9 August the same year that the company had decided against overhead wires and instead would use the third-rail system of electrification, and included the spur connecting Herne Hill and Tulse Hill as one of the additional sections to be electrified. Electric trains began running every 20 minutes from Herne Hill to Victoria and Blackfriars during the day, before being stored overnight at the sorting sidings north of the station.

The distinctive signal box overlooking Norwood Road and a similar signal box at the northern end of the station were demolished in 1956 and replaced by a single signal box adjacent to the north junction. The replacement signal box was in use from June 1956 until December 1981, when its functions were transferred to Victoria; the building still exists and is used by railway staff. The signalling at Herne Hill was upgraded from semaphores to colour lights on 8 March 1959 as part of the Kent Coast electrification plan.

By 1959, the pattern of commuter services at Herne Hill had taken the shape it held into the 21st century: stopping trains from Victoria to Orpington and from Holborn Viaduct to Wimbledon and Sutton; the only exceptions are that unlike the modern Sutton Loop, trains to Wimbledon went via West Croydon, and Holborn Viaduct was replaced by the Thameslink Core. However, there was a decline in the number of electric trains on the Chatham Main Line through Herne Hill in the years after the war. Immediately after electrification in 1925, six trains used the route between Herne Hill and Shortlands in each direction during every off-peak hour; by 1960, it had dropped to two trains in each direction. The Herne Hill Sorting Sidings closed on 1 August 1966 and the freight line to the east of the station was taken out of service. Nothing of the sidings remains: residential accommodation has been built along Shakespeare Road, where the western sidings were, and commercial premises have been built along Milkwood Road, where the eastern sidings were.

=== 1988–present: Privatisation ===
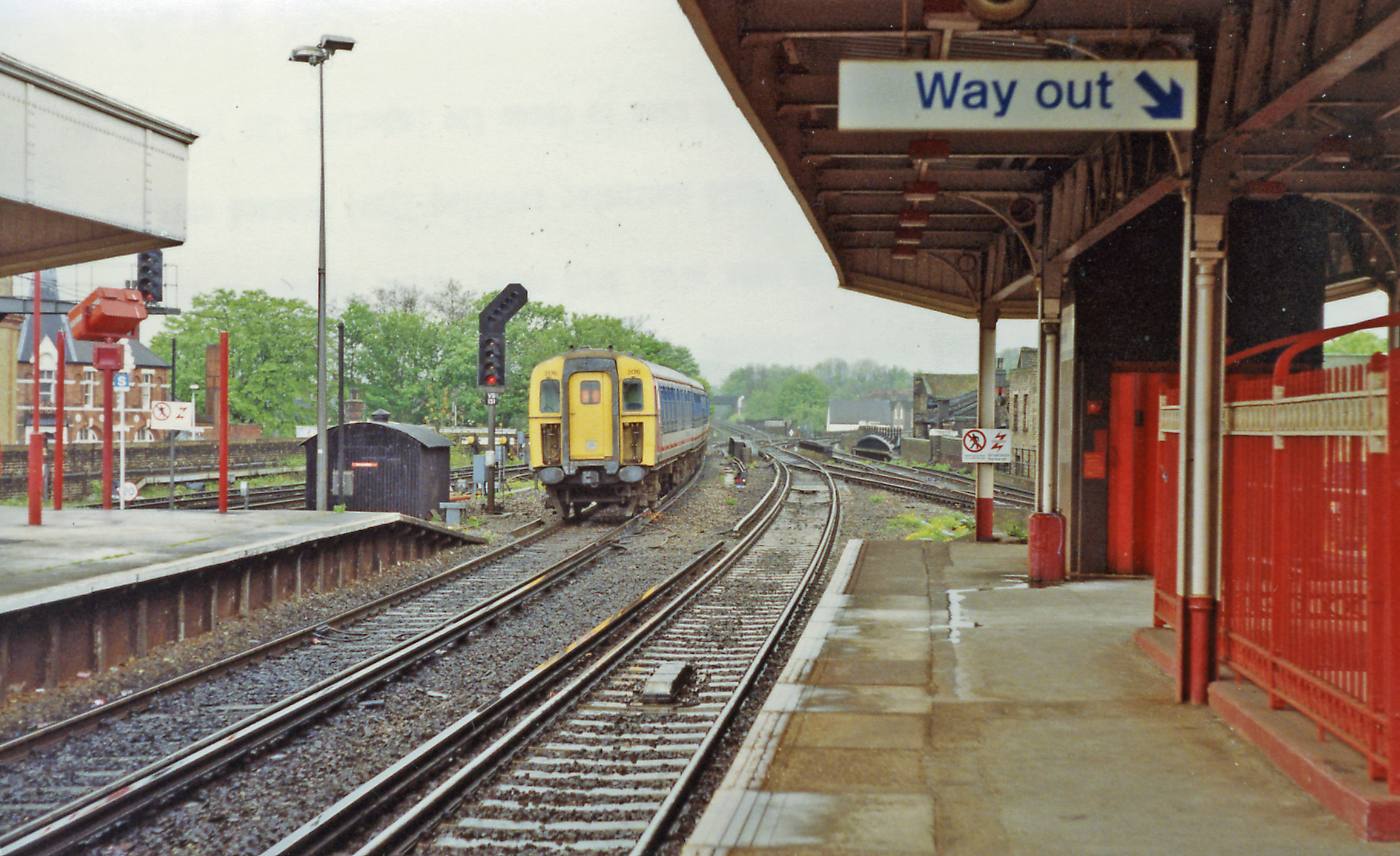
The station in 1992, after it had been modernised

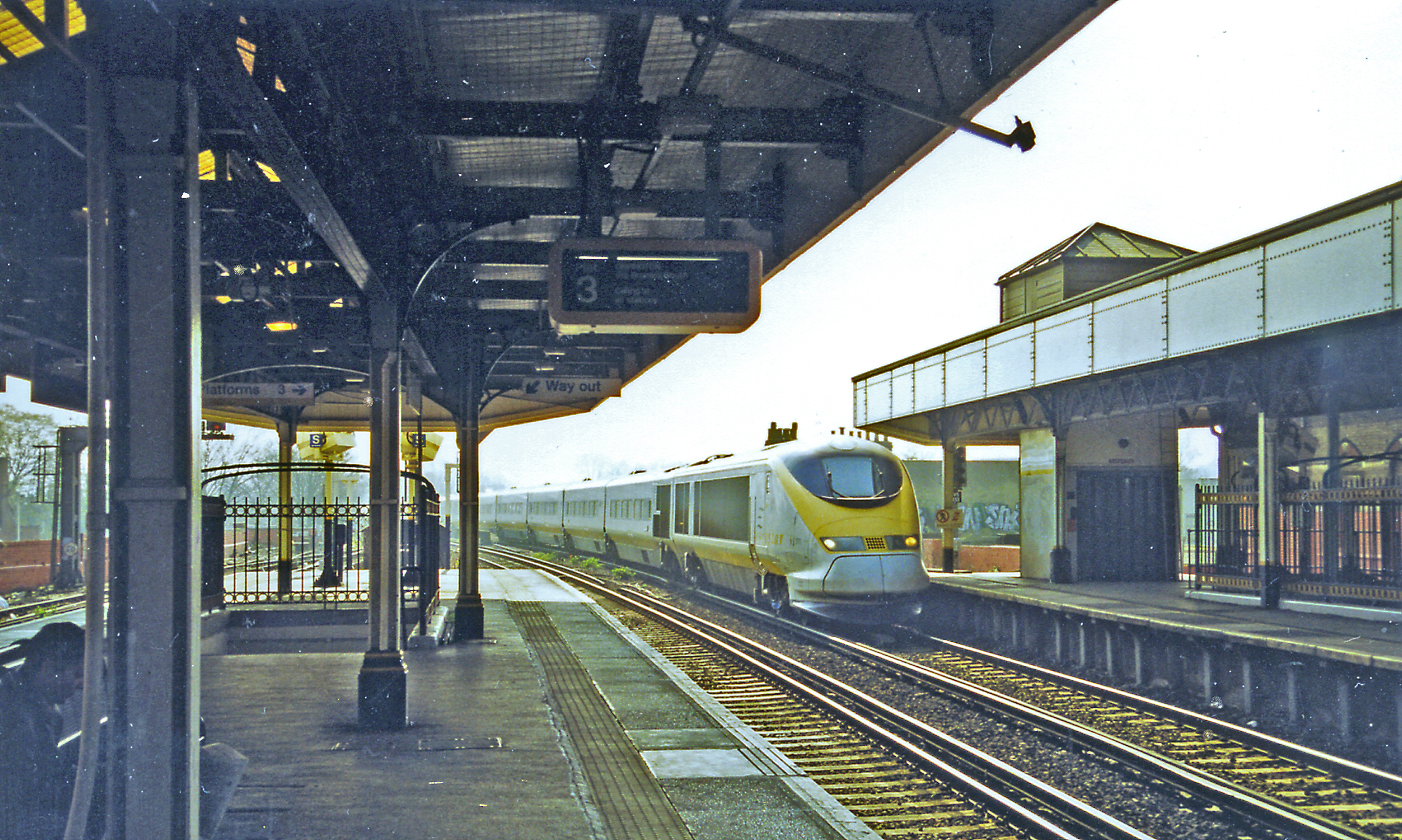
A Eurostar train passing through Herne Hill in March 2000

In 1988, Snow Hill tunnel re-opened and the former LCDR City Branch formed the basis of the new Thameslink route. From 1994, Eurostar services linking London Waterloo to Brussels and Paris passed through Herne Hill without stopping. When these ceased in November 2007 upon the completion of High Speed 1, this marked the end of rail services to the continent via Herne Hill, which had been started by the LCDR in 1863 when the line between Victoria and Dover via Herne Hill was completed.

Between 2009 and 2020, Network Rail delivered a major upgrade of the Thameslink Route, which was called the Thameslink Programme. One key objective of the programme was allowing more trains to travel between central London and Brighton; this was prevented by a bottleneck between London Bridge and Blackfriars where the railway travelled on a viaduct through the historic Borough Market. One option was to route all trains via Herne Hill; this could be achieved by grade separating the two lines through Herne Hill using a new viaduct to the east of the existing one. Then, a flyover would connect the southern end of the new viaduct to the line between Tulse Hill and North Dulwich, meaning those tracks were carried over the top of the Chatham Main Line towards Tulse Hill. This proposal was rejected in 2004 because of its environmental impact on Herne Hill and the larger number of interchanges offered on the London Bridge route; the Borough Market viaduct was widened instead.

One other part of the Thameslink Programme was the closure of its branch to Moorgate was closed; to compensate for the lost sidings, the disused freight line to the east of Herne Hill was partly reopened in 2009 as a siding. The line's connection to the south junction was severed during these works, and it did not directly improve services or passenger experience at the station. The station had become fully accessible by 2010: lifts were installed to provide step-free access to the platforms in 2008, and a unisex disabled-accessible toilet was opened on the southbound platforms in 2010.

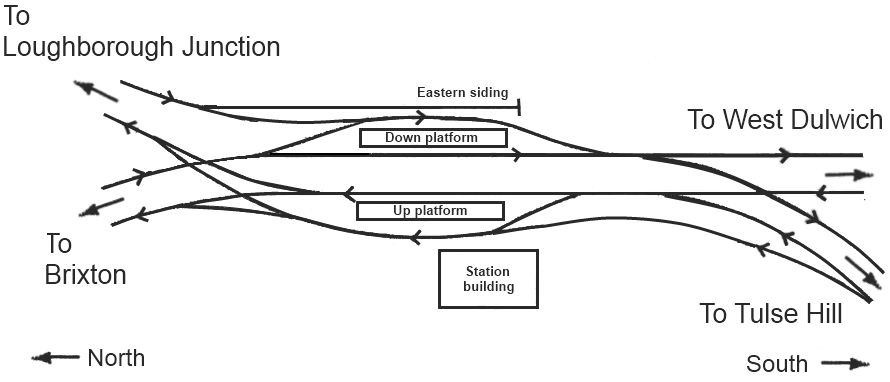
Contemporary layout of tracks and structures at Herne Hill station

Network Rail, in its July 2011 London & South East route utilisation strategy, recommended that all services from Herne Hill towards Blackfriars should terminate in the bay platforms at Blackfriars once the redevelopment of London Bridge had been completed, and that diverted Thameslink trains returned there. Passengers from Herne Hill would then have had to change at Blackfriars to travel further north. In January 2013, the Department for Transport (DfT) announced that trains serving the Sutton Loop Line (also known as the Wimbledon Loop) would continue to travel across London after 2018. The number of trains calling at Herne Hill on the route would remain unchanged, with four trains per hour. Due to the redevelopment of London Bridge that closed it to Bedford–Brighton trains, an extra four trains per hour were diverted via Herne Hill between 2014 and 2018. The trains did not stop at the station, instead running fast between London Blackfriars and East Croydon; this decision was made as the 12-car trains could not stop at the station's platforms without still covering the junctions either side.

== Accidents ==
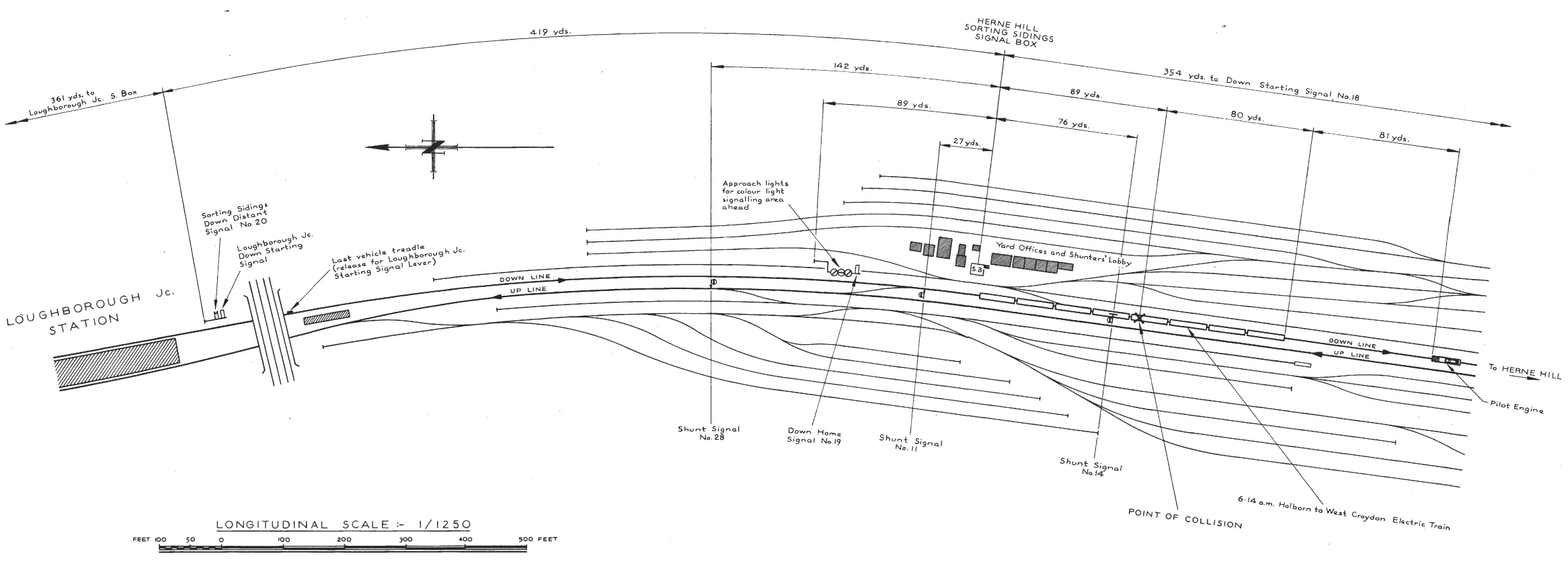
A map showing the layout of the former sidings north of Herne Hill and the point of the 1960 collision

On 6 November 1947, a steam train approaching from West Dulwich passed a signal at danger in heavy fog and crashed into an electric train crossing the station's south junction towards Tulse Hill. One passenger on the electric train was killed and nine others were hospitalised.

A minor accident occurred at the station on 30 June 1957; a light engine travelling towards Tulse Hill was waiting to cross the south junction when it was struck from behind by an express passenger train from Victoria that had passed a signal at danger. The driver of the light engine and two passengers from the express were hospitalised but quickly discharged.

A second fatal collision occurred at the sorting sidings, just north of the station, on 1 April 1960. The sidings were shrouded in fog that reduced visibility to only 60 feet (18 m). A steam locomotive was waiting on the southbound track outside Herne Hill for a proceed signal when the signalman cleared an electric passenger train behind the steam locomotive to proceed down the same track. The steam locomotive was struck from behind, killing the electric train's driver.

== Future ==
The route from Victoria to Orpington via Herne Hill was projected to be amongst the most congested and overcrowded in South East London by 2026. Network Rail has forecast that by 2031, there will be 900 more passengers attempting to travel on the route between Herne Hill and Blackfriars during the busiest peak hour every weekday than can be accommodated on the trains. It is anticipated that eight-car trains with higher capacity, similar to the Class 378 trains used on the London Overground, will eventually be required to address this shortfall.

=== Station infrastructure ===
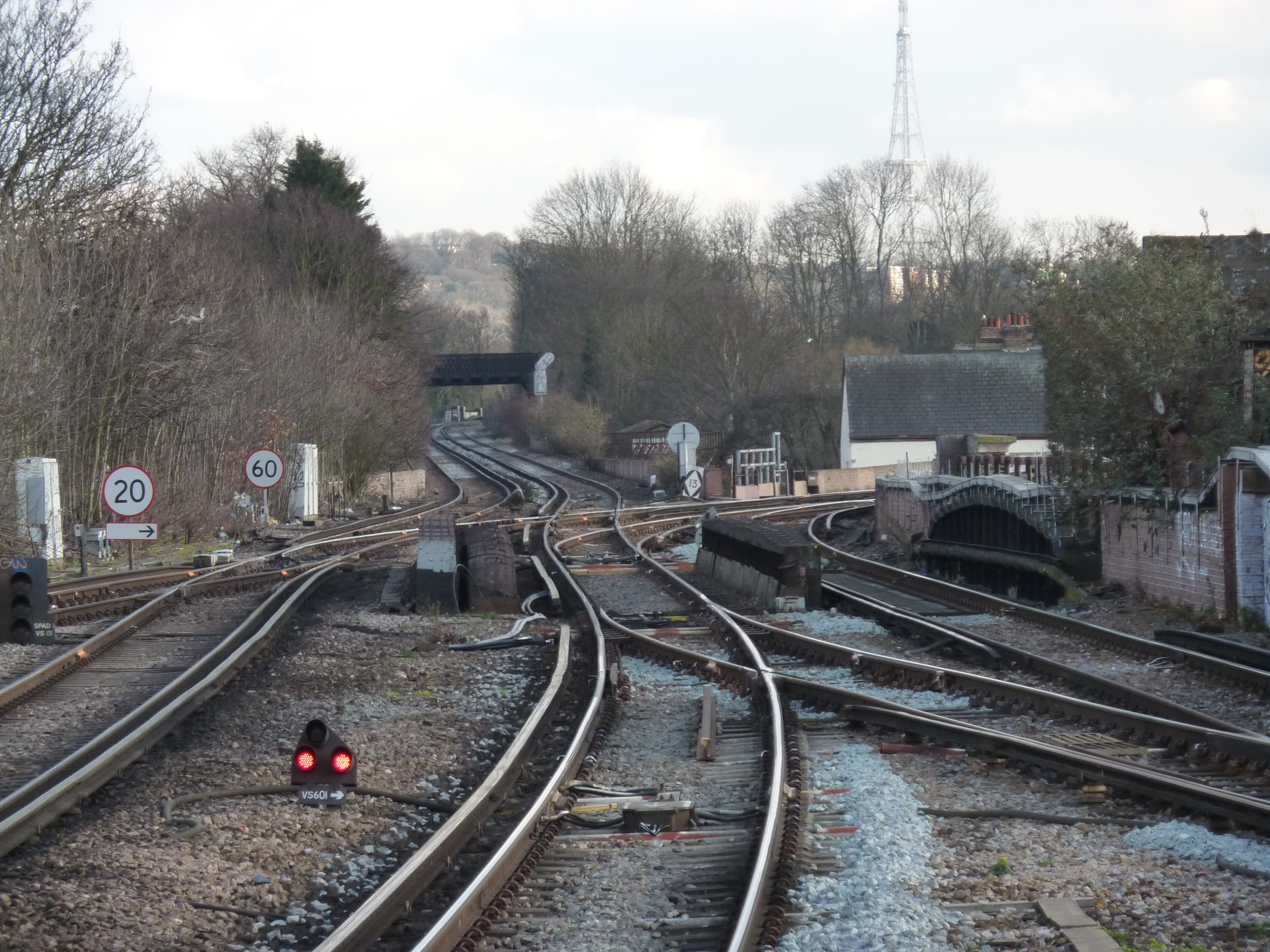
The current southern flat junction at Herne Hill, considered for grade separation

Network Rail has considered grade-separating the two lines passing through Herne Hill so that trains would not cross each other's paths at the station's junctions; this restricts the number of services that can pass through the station. A 2008 route utilisation strategy for South London concluded that this improvement would not be required before 2020 but recommended safeguarding the required land. Grade-separation was supported by Southeastern, and First Capital Connect believed it should be given more consideration, but Network Rail has stated that it would be difficult to carry out the work because the station is on a viaduct and surrounded by buildings. The 2011 route utilisation strategy, which examined options for congestion relief at Herne Hill before 2031, did not suggest grade-separation as an option in the 2011–2031 period.

Any potential project to grade-separate the junctions on either side at the station would also enable the platforms to be lengthened, allowing them to accommodate 12-car trains; this is because the northern junction would no longer be there. However, the same issue of platform length exists at Tulse Hill and Elephant & Castle, so longer trains could not be used on the Sutton Loop line without extending their platforms as well. Transport for London (TfL) has suggested there may be potential for the turnback siding to be converted into a passenger platform. However, this would require substantial changes to the station, as there is no direct access to the platforms from Milkwood Road, and the current subway for accessing the platforms does not extend east of the southbound platform.

=== Addition of other services ===
The Mayor of London published a long-term vision for the London Overground in February 2012, which recommended that all London suburban rail services eventually be devolved to TfL. Southeastern's suburban services include the route between Victoria and Orpington via Herne Hill, and the Sutton Loop Line also sees these suburban services operated by Thameslink. In 2016, the transport secretary, Chris Grayling, announced that the government would deny TfL's plans to take over the services in the Southeastern franchise, but would allow it to maintain input in the franchise's development. The DfT Operator took over the franchise in September 2021 after the former operator severely breached its contract, and the services are still held by the franchise.

In the past, TfL has considered extending the Victoria line to either Herne Hill or Tulse Hill to improve capacity and turnaround capability. However, they clarified in 2005 that they were not interested in pursuing such infrastructure projects because of the high cost and other options available to improve local transport. The Victoria Line is expected to continue to grow in usage and therefore in the future a project such as extension to Herne Hill may need to be pursued to manage this.

== Location ==
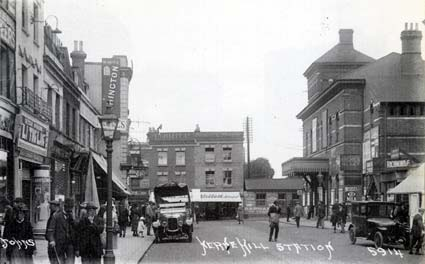
The area around the station in 1921, with the station building on the right

The area now known as Herne Hill had been a rural part of the Manor of Milkwell since the 13th century. Two tributaries of the River Effra met at the undeveloped site of the future station; it was known as Island Green until the 18th century. In 1783 a timber merchant, Samuel Sanders, bought Herne Hill from the Manor. The Effra was covered over in the 1820s, and the area had become an upper-class suburb by the mid-19th century, with one contemporaneous author referring to the hill as "Elysium" for merchants. The opening of the railway station, which provided convenient and cheap access to central London, started the urbanisation of Herne Hill, and all of the large estates were eventually cleared to make way for many smaller houses. The development of new residential streets in the 1870s increased the population of the local area by 3,000.

The station sits at the bottom of the hill that gives the area its name and is close to Brockwell Park. The station building is situated on Railton Road, on the western side of the viaduct. There is also access from the east via a foot tunnel from Milkwood Road; the two roads run parallel to the viaduct by the station, one on either side. The section of Railton Road outside the station is mixed usage for pedestrians and vehicles. The station is 3 miles 76 chains (3.95 miles, 6.36 km) down the line from London Victoria, and is in London fare zones 2 and 3. The station is also served by London Buses routes in both the day- and night-time, as well as a bus serving Burntwood School.

== Services ==
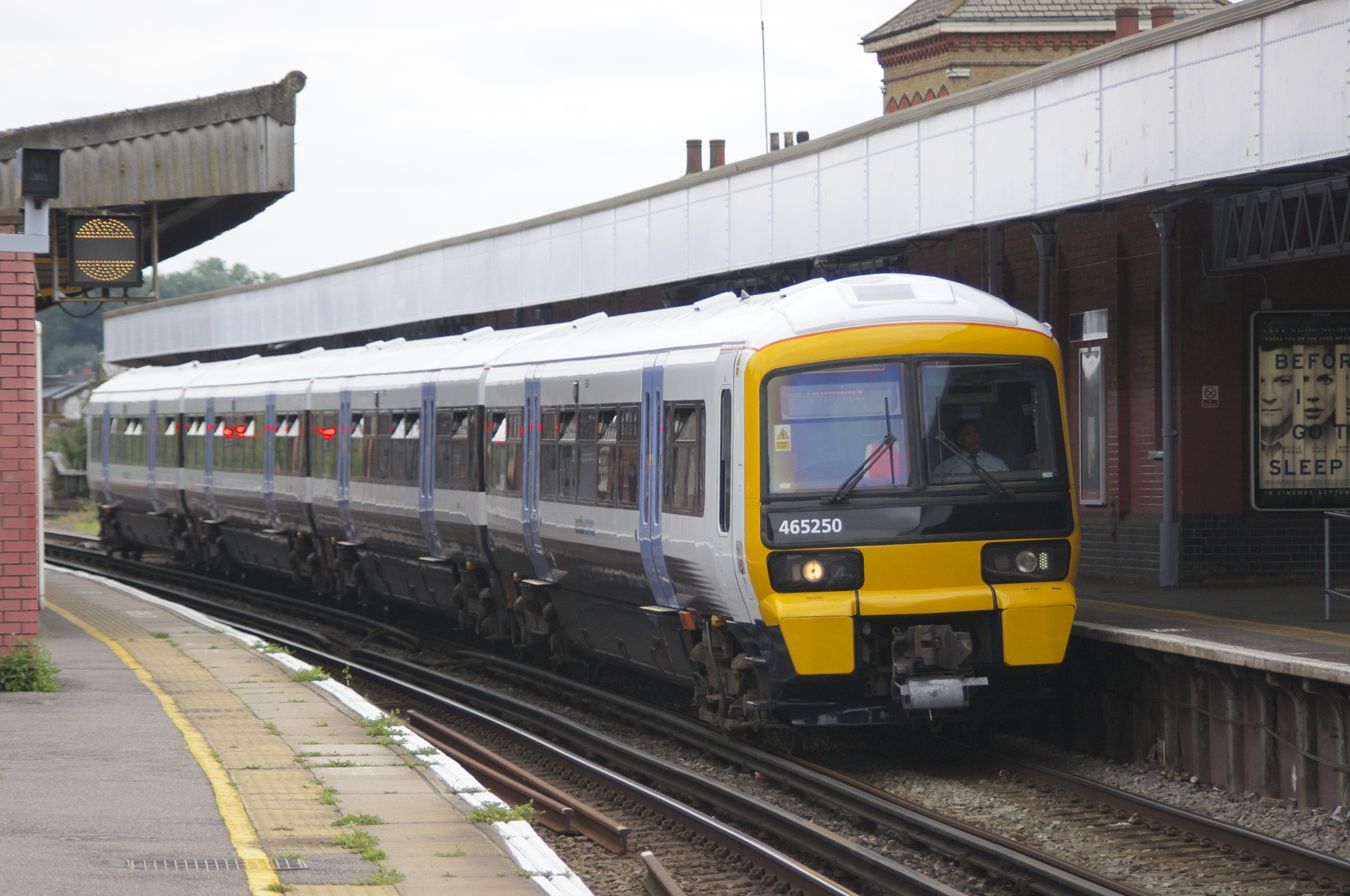
A Class 465 at the station in 2014

Services at Herne Hill are operated by Southeastern and Thameslink; Thameslink use Class 700 EMUs, and Southeastern use Networkers as part of their Metro services.

As of the December 2025 timetable, the services in trains per hour (tph) is:

- 4 tph to St Albans City via London Blackfriars (Thameslink),
- 4 tph to London Victoria (Southeastern),
- 4 tph to Orpington via Bromley South (Southeastern),
- 2 tph to Sutton via Mitcham Junction (Thameslink),
- 2 tph to Sutton via Wimbledon (Thameslink).

Between 21:57 and 23:56 on Mondays–Saturdays, Thameslink services are extended beyond St Albans City to Bedford. Services on Sundays have various termini throughout the day, including West Hampstead Thameslink, St Albans City, Luton, and Beford. During peak times, Southeastern provide an extra two trains per hour to London Blackfriars.

Preceding station	National Rail	Following station
Brixton	Southeastern Chatham Main Line	West Dulwich
Loughborough Junction	Southeastern Peak-hours only	West Dulwich
Loughborough Junction	Thameslink Thameslink	Tulse Hill

== Bibliography ==
=== Websites ===
- "A new station for London Bridge". Thameslink Programme. Archived from the original on 1 February 2012.
- "Buses from Herne Hill" (PDF). Transport for London. 29 April 2023. Archived (PDF) from the original on 20 May 2025.
- '"Extension to Victoria Underground Lines Southwards to Herne Hill". London Assembly. 10 April 2005. Archived from the original on 3 May 2026.
- "Helping older and disabled passengers". London & South Eastern Railway. November 2012. Archived from the original on 3 August 2013.
- "Herne Hill junction improvement scheme". Lambeth Borough Council. Archived from the original on 28 December 2009.
- Historic England. "Herne Hill railway station, entrance block only (Grade II) (1376144)". National Heritage List for England.
- "Herne Hill Station, Herne Hill". Lambeth Borough Council. Archived from the original on 26 September 2013.
- "Herne Hill Station Plan" (PDF). National Rail. Archived (PDF) from the original on 3 May 2026.
- "London Rail and Tube Map" (PDF). National Rail and Transport for London. December 2025. Archived (PDF) from the original on 2 February 2023.
- "Mid Kent and London and South Western Junction Railways Company". The National Archives. Archived from the original on 19 May 2021.
- "National Rail All Stations Route Map" (PDF). National Rail. 12 December 2025. Archived (PDF) from the original on 14 March 2026.
- "Station facilities for Herne Hill". National Rail. Archived from the original on 5 March 2026.
- "Stress on the London Rail Network". Transport Select Committee. Archived from the original on 15 December 2024 – via UK Parliament.
- "Table 163 (London to Wimbledon and Sutton via Streatham and Tulse Hill) – December 2025 timetable". National Rail. 19 November 2025. Archived from the original on 20 April 2026.
- "Table 180 (London to Herne Hill, Beckenham Junction, Denmark Hill, Catford, Bromley South, Orpington, Swanley and Sevenoaks) – December 2025 timetable". National Rail. 19 November 2025. Archived from the original on 20 April 2026.
- "Thameslink Key Output Zero – Blackfriars Terminus Platforms Closure". Southern Electric Group. Archived from the original on 22 March 2014.
- "The nineteenth century". Herne Hill Society. Archived from the original on 16 January 2016.
- "Transport Plan – Southward Extensions". London Assembly. 16 March 2003. Archived from the original on 14 November 2012.

=== Newspapers and journals ===
- "The Mid-Kent and London and South-Western Junction Railways Company (Provisionally Registered)". The Railway Times. XV (44). 30 October 1852 – via Google Books.
- "London, Chatham and Dover Railway". The Building News. 10. 9 January 1863.
- "Herne Hill railway station". The Building News. 10: 327. 1 May 1863.
- "Banks, finance and miscellaneous companies". The Railway News. VI (137). 11 August 1866 – via Google Books.
- Willock, H.B (1884). "English Express Trains in 1871; and a Comparison Between Them and Those of 1883". Journal of the Statistical Society of London. 47 (2). Royal Statistical Society. doi:10.2307/2979189 – via JSTOR.
- "Miscellania". The Builder. 47. The Builder, Covent Garden. 1884.
- Frampton, George (1896). "The Revival of English Domestic Architecture". The Studio. 7. National Magazine Company – via Internet Archive.
- Acworth, W. M. (1923). "Grouping Under the Railways Act, 1921". The Economic Journal. 33 (129). doi:10.2307/2222914. ISSN 0013-0133 – via JSTOR.
- "Colour-Light Signalling in London Area, Southern Region". Railway Gazette. 110. 3 April 1959 – via Google Books.
- "Elevating Experience" (PDF). Herne Hill Society Newsletter. No. 104. Herne Hill Society. Autumn 2008. Archived (PDF) from the original on 5 May 2025.
- "Government safeguards future of the Wimbledon Loop" (Press release). Department for Transport. 21 January 2013. Archived from the original on 3 May 2026.
- "Herne Hill Station: Entrance Canopy" (PDF). Annual Report and Accounts 2015–16. Railway Heritage Trust. July 2016. Archived (PDF) from the original on 23 June 2024.
- Topham, Gwyn (6 December 2016). "Plans for Transport for London to take over capital's rail lines ditched". The Guardian. ISSN 0261-3077. Archived from the original on 21 July 2023.
- "New cutting-edge trains in full operation across Thameslink route" (Press release). Govia Thameslink Railway. 18 September 2017. Archived from the original on 2 February 2023.
- Johnston, Katherine (18 February 2019). "Herne Hill station's closed-up hall brought back to life as residents are asked to come up with ideas for how the space". Southwark News. Archived from the original on 3 May 2026.
- Topham, Gwyn; Kollewe, Julia (28 September 2021). "Government to take over Southeastern after serious breach of franchise". The Guardian. Archived from the original on 13 October 2022.
- "Southeastern announces major step towards multi-million-pound improvement in Metro train fleet" (Press release). Southeastern. 15 May 2024. Archived from the original on 3 April 2026.
- "Kent, Sussex & Wessex Sectional Appendix" (PDF). National Electronic Sectional Appendix. Network Rail. 7 March 2026.

=== Reports ===
- Wilson, G.R.S. (29 January 1948). Railway Accidents: Report on the Collision which occurred on 6th November, 1947, at Herne Hill on the Southern Railway (PDF) (Report). London: Ministry of Transport. Archived (PDF) from the original on 31 March 2024.
- McMullen, D. (16 October 1957). Railway Accidents: Report on the collision which occurred on 30th June 1957 at Herne Hill in the Southern Region British Railways (PDF) (Report). London: Ministry of Transport and Civil Aviation. Archived (PDF) from the original on 26 June 2025.
- Reed, W.P. (28 June 1960). Railway Accidents: Report on the collision which occurred on 1st April 1960 at Herne Hill Sorting Sidings signal box in the Southern Region British Railways (PDF) (Report). London: Ministry of Transport, His Majesty's Stationery Office. Archived (PDF) from the original on 31 March 2024.
- Channel Tunnel International Rail Link (PDF) (Report). British Rail. June 1986. Archived from the original (PDF) on 31 March 2024.
- Network Rail (June 2004). Thameslink 2000: Environmental Statement – Alternatives Report (PDF) (Report). Archived from the original (PDF) on 31 August 2021.
- "Options considered to bridge the gap between present demand and future growth". Response to Route Utilisation Strategy consultation (PDF) (Report). Southeastern. 18 October 2007. Archived from the original (PDF) on 18 January 2016.
- Consultation Response – South London route utilisation strategy (PDF) (Report). First Capital Connect. 26 October 2007. Archived from the original (PDF) on 18 January 2016.
- Network Rail (March 2008). South London Route utilisation strategy (PDF) (Report). Archived from the original (PDF) on 19 January 2012.
- Variation to Proposed G1 Network Change: Herne Hill Turnback Facilities (PDF) (Report). Network Rail. 29 May 2008. Archived from the original (PDF) on 18 January 2016.
- "Rail Overcrowding". Transport Committee (Report). London Assembly. 13 November 2008. Archived from the original on 18 May 2012.
- "9.4 Gap H: Elephant & Castle corridor" ( (PDF)). London and South East RUS Consultation Response (Report). Transport for London. 18 March 2011. Archived from the original on 18 January 2016.
- Network Rail (July 2011). London and South East Route utilisation strategy (PDF) (Report). Archived from the original (PDF) on 13 December 2013.
- Greater London Authority (February 2012). The Mayor's Rail Vision (PDF) (Report). Archived (PDF) from the original on 26 September 2013.
- Programme Level Close Out Report (PDF) (Report). Thameslink Programme. December 2020. Archived from the original on 22 July 2021.

=== Books ===
- Adams, W.J (1866). Bradshaw's Railway Manual, Shareholders' Guide, and Official Directory. Vol. XIII.
- Bianco, Don; Young, George (2003). Herne Hill Heritage Trail. London: Herne Hill Society. ISBN 978-1-873520-46-8.
- Brunton, John (2011). A Short History of Herne Hill. London: Herne Hill Society. p. 13. ISBN 978-1-873520-83-3.
- Cherry, Bridget; Pevsner, Nikolaus (1983). Buildings of England, London: South. Vol. II. London: Penguin. ISBN 978-0-300096-51-4.
- Course, Edwin (1962). London Railways. London: B.T Batsford.
- Dendy Marshall, C.F.; Kidner, R.W. (1968) [1963]. A History of the Southern Railway (2nd ed.). London: Ian Allan Publishing. ISBN 978-0-711000-59-9 – via Internet Archive.
- Herne Hill Society (1992). A Glance at the History of Herne Hill. London: Herne Hill Society.
- Hone, William (1830). The Every-day Book and Table Book. Vol. II. Thomas Tegg – via Internet Archive.
- Jackson, Alan (1969). London's Termini. Newton Abbot: David & Charles. ISBN 978-0-7153-4474-3.
- Kidner, R.W. (1952). The London, Chatham and Dover Railway. South Godstone, Surrey: Oakwood Press. OCLC 12264028.
- Lock, George; Ward, Ebenezer (1879). Ward and Lock's Pictorial Guide to London. Ward, Lock & Co.
- Long, Helen C. (1993). The Edwardian House: The Middle-Class Home in Britain, 1880–1914. Manchester University Press. p. 55. ISBN 978-0-7190-3728-3.
- Marshall, W.W. (1988). Old Ordnance Survey Maps Brixton & Herne Hill 1870. Alan Godfrey Maps. ISBN 978-0-85054-151-9.
- Mitchell, Vic; Smith, Keith (1992). Victoria to Bromley South (Southern Main Line). Midhurst, W. Sussex: Middleton Press. ISBN 978-0-906520-98-7.
- Moody, G.T. (1957). Southern Electric. London: Ian Allan Publishing. OCLC 59019770 – via Internet Archive.
- Nock, O.S. (1961). The South Eastern and Chatham Railway. London: Ian Allan Publishing. pp. 53, 60. OCLC 254188896.
- Reynolds, Siân (2007). Paris–Edinburgh: Cultural Connections in the Belle Epoque. Farnham: Ashgate Publishing. ISBN 978-0-754634-64-5 – via Internet Archive.
- Sheppard, F. H. W. (1956). Survey of London: volume 26: Lambeth: Southern area. British History Online.
- Stanford, Edward (1864). Stanford's Library Map Of London And Its Suburbs 1864: East Brixton, South London Railway, London Chatham & Dover Railway, Herne Hill, & Dulwich.
- Symes, Rodney (1973). Railway Architecture of Greater London. Reading: Osprey Publishing. ISBN 978-0-85045-123-8.
- Talling, Paul (2011). London's Lost Rivers. London: Random House. ISBN 978-1-84794-597-6 – via Internet Archive.
- Turner, John Howard (1978). The London, Brighton, and South Coast Railway. Vol. II: Establishment and Growth. London: B.T Batsford. ISBN 978-0-7134-1198-0 – via Internet Archive.
- Wheeler, Michael (1993). The Lamp of Memory: Ruskin, Tradition and Architecture. Manchester: Manchester University Press. ISBN 978-0-7190-3710-8.
- White, H.P. (1971). A Regional History of the Railways of Great Britain: Greater London (New ed.). Newton Abbot: David & Charles. ISBN 978-0-7153-6145-0 – via Internet Archive.
- Wilson, James (1973). The story of Norwood. London: London Borough of Lambeth. ISBN 978-0-9501893-3-8.
