= Boulton's Siding =

Boulton's Siding was a British locomotive-hire business owned by Isaac Watt Boulton and situated alongside the Oldham branch of the Manchester, Sheffield and Lincolnshire Railway at Ashton-under-Lyne. It operated from 1864 to 1898.

== Overview ==
In the 1860s, established railway companies were replacing their small 2-2-0 and 0-4-0 steam locomotives with larger, more modern machines. Mr I. W. Boulton took advantage of this by buying up some of the old locomotives, modifying them in his workshop, and hiring them out to contractors for use on civil engineering projects, including the building of new railways.

The usual modifications were to fit smaller driving wheels (to increase tractive effort) and to convert tender locomotives to tank locomotives.

By the 1880s, the hire business was declining so Mr Boulton started building new locomotives. He used his own patent design of boiler which had a single large flue with cross water-tubes. This was, essentially, a horizontal predecessor of the vertical water-tube boilers later used in Sentinel Steam Waggons. Although Boulton's boilers steamed well, they were difficult to repair so they never became popular. The business declined during the 1890s and closed in 1898. Mr Boulton died in 1899.

== Sources ==
- The Chronicles of Boulton's Siding by Alfred Rosling Bennett, first published by the Locomotive Publishing Company in 1927, new impression by David & Charles 1971, ISBN 0-7153-5318-7

Contents of the book
Chapter I: Bury locomotives:
Chapter II: Grand Junction Railway locomotive "Shark, No. 3":
Chapter III: Original engine of the Great Central Railway "Python, No.1":
Chapter IV: Engines built by Sharp, Roberts and Co.:
Chapter V: Reputed locomotives of the Liverpool and Manchester Railway:
Chapter VI: Wolverton goods engines:
Chapter VII: Locomotives from Cardiff and the Portland Breakwater:
Chapter VIII: Geared engines: "Perseverance," "Little Grimsby," " Lilliputian ":
Chapter IX: Geared engines continued: "Rattlesnake," No. 17," " Lion ":
Chapter X: Geared engines continued: "Ashtonian," "Pugsy," "Chaplin," "Marshall":
Chapter XI: Engines from the L.&N.W.R. and the Taff Vale Railway:
Chapter XII: Engines from the Lancashire and Yorkshire Railway:
Chapter XIII: Engines by E. B. Wilson and Company and Manning Wardle and Company:
Chapter XIV: Engines by George England and Co.:
Chapter XV: Locomotives by Hughes and Co., Loughborough:
Chapter XVI: Locomotives with water-tube boilers:
Chapter XVII: Broad gauge (7 feet) locomotives:
Chapter XVIII: Broad gauge (7 feet) locomotives [continued]: "Fowler's Ghost":
Chapter XIX: The "Ghost" materializes:
Chapter XX: Miscellaneous Locomotives,"Eclipse,""Bristol," "Dot,"" Brymbo," "Brighton," "Lewin":
Chapter XXI: Miscellaneous locomotives: [continued]; "Hercules No. 2," "Wotton," "Briton", "Cyclops," "Helena":
Chapter XXII: Miscellaneous locomotives [continued]: Adams's Steam Carriage," Queen of the Forest,""Ant," "Neilson." Engines by John Harris, Darlington. Engine by Joicey, Newcastle upon Tyne:
Chapter XXIII: Miscellaneous locomotives [continued] "Ravenhead," "James" Smith of Coven's "No. 122."New Cross Engine. Bath Engines. Engine by John Fowler & Co., Leeds. Engine by Fox, Walker & Co. Fairlie Engine. "No. 44 "Fairy," Atlantic," ' Hawk, " No. 1129, Crewe Engine Unidentified. "Victory," "Exeter.":
Chapter XXIV: Boulton's yard in 1869. Mr. I. W. Boulton's Diaries. Conclusion.

This book was founded on a series of articles contributed by the author to the Locomotive Magazine between November, 1920, and February, 1925. During publication many new facts came to light. These [were] incorporated and the whole was carefully revised and re-arranged.
