= Sir John Fowler, 1st Baronet =

English civil engineer (1817–1898)

Sir John Fowler KCMG LLD FRSE
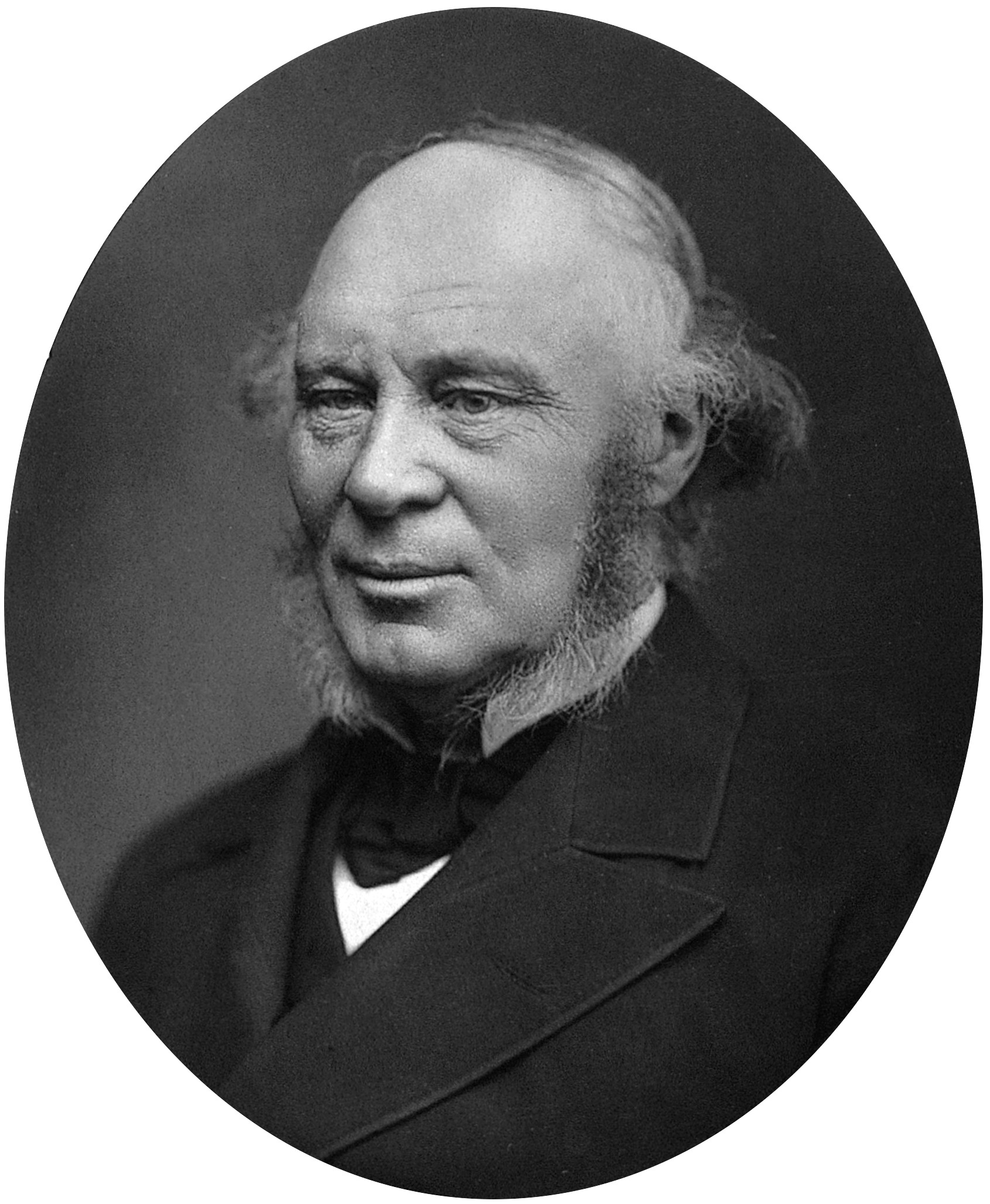
- Born: 15 July 1817; Wadsley, Sheffield, West Riding of Yorkshire, England
- Died: 20 November 1898 (aged 81); Bournemouth, Hampshire, England
- Engineering career
- Discipline: Civil engineer
- Institutions: Institution of Civil Engineers (president); Institution of Mechanical Engineers
- Projects: Metropolitan Railway; Millwall Dock; Forth Bridge (A); Manchester Central (II*); Wicker Arches (II*); Torksey Viaduct (II*)
- Significant design: Fowler's Ghost fireless locomotive

Sir John Fowler, 1st Baronet, KCMG, LLD, FRSE (15 July 1817 – 20 November 1898) was an English civil engineer specialising in the construction of railways and railway infrastructure. In the 1850s and 1860s, he was engineer for the world's first underground railway, London's Metropolitan Railway, built by the "cut-and-cover" method under city streets. In the 1880s, he was chief engineer for the Forth Bridge, which opened in 1890. Fowler's was a long and eminent career, spanning most of the 19th century's railway expansion, and he was engineer, adviser or consultant to many British and foreign railway companies and governments. He was the youngest president of the Institution of Civil Engineers, between 1865 and 1867, and his major works represent a lasting legacy of Victorian engineering.

== Early life ==
Fowler was born in Wadsley, Sheffield, Yorkshire, England, to land surveyor John Fowler and his wife Elizabeth (née Swann). He was educated privately at Whitley Hall near Ecclesfield. He trained under John Towlerton Leather, engineer of the Sheffield waterworks, and with Leather's uncle, George Leather, on the Aire and Calder Navigation and on railway surveys. From 1837 he worked for John Urpeth Rastrick on railway projects including the London and Brighton Railway and the unbuilt West Cumberland and Furness Railway. He then worked again for George Leather as resident engineer on the Stockton and Hartlepool Railway and was appointed engineer to the railway when it opened in 1841. Fowler initially established a practice as a consulting engineer in the Yorkshire and Lincolnshire area, but, a heavy workload led him to move to London in 1844. He became a member of the Institution of Mechanical Engineers in 1847, the year the Institution was founded, and a member of the Institution of Civil Engineers in 1849. On 2 July 1850 he married Elizabeth Broadbent (died 19 November 1901), daughter of J. Broadbent of Manchester. The couple had four sons.

== Railways ==
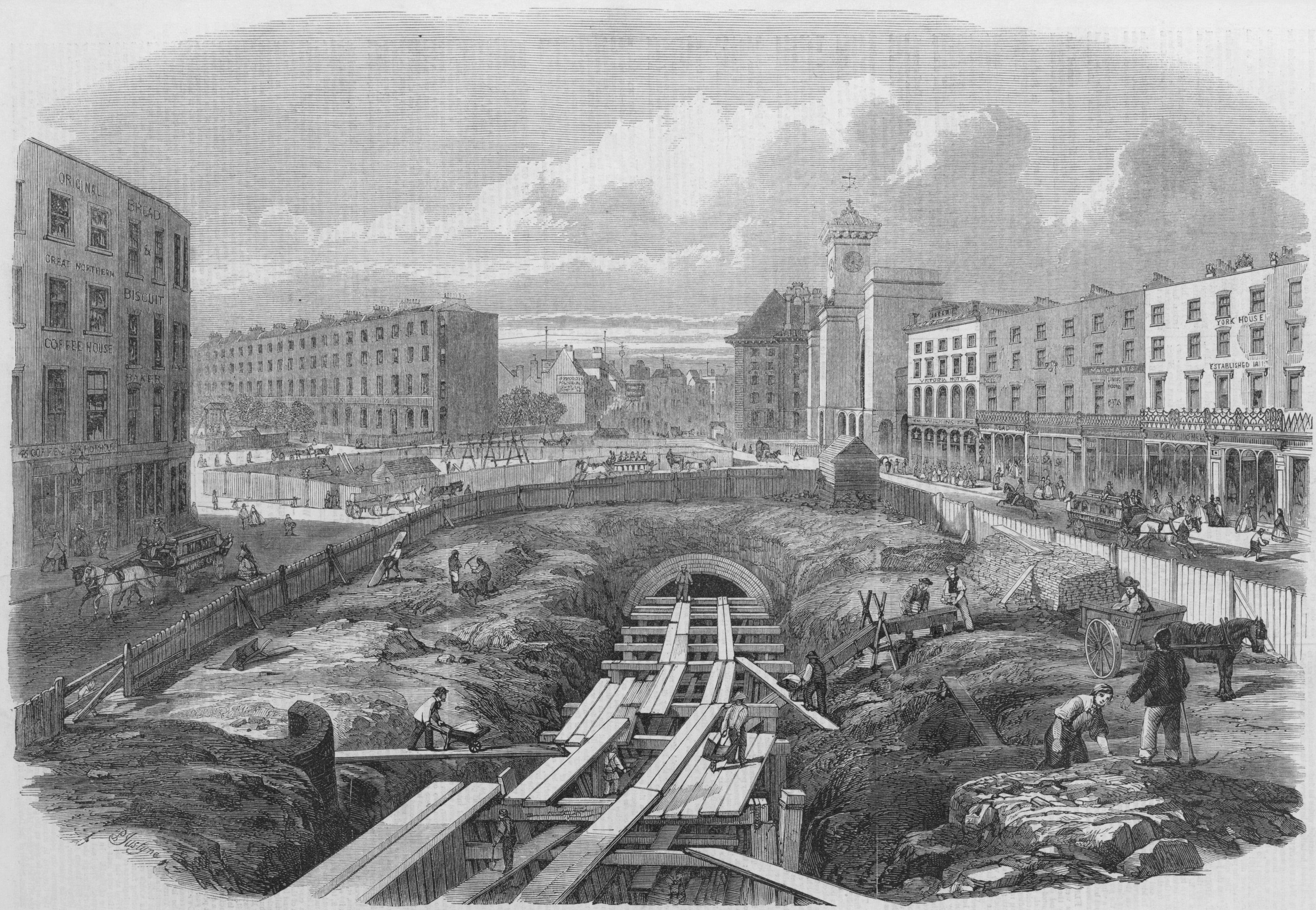
Construction of the Metropolitan Railway close to King's Cross station in 1861

Fowler established a busy practice, working on many railway schemes across the country. He became chief engineer for the Manchester, Sheffield and Lincolnshire Railway and was engineer of the East Lincolnshire Railway, the Oxford, Worcester and Wolverhampton Railway and the Severn Valley Railway. In 1853, he became chief engineer of the Metropolitan Railway in London, the world's first underground railway. Constructed in shallow "cut-and-cover" trenches beneath roads, the line opened between Paddington and Farringdon in 1863. Fowler was also engineer for the associated District Railway and the Hammersmith and City Railway. Today these railways form the majority of the London Underground's Circle line. For his work on the Metropolitan Railway Fowler was paid the great sum of £152,000 (£14.9 million today), with £157,000 (£15.3 million today), from the District Railway. Although some of this would have been passed on to staff and contractors, Sir Edward Watkin, chairman of the Metropolitan Railway from 1872, complained that "No engineer in the world was so highly paid."

Other railways that Fowler consulted for were the London Tilbury and Southend Railway, the Great Northern Railway, the Highland Railway and the Cheshire Lines Railway. Following the death of Isambard Kingdom Brunel in 1859, Fowler was retained by the Great Western Railway. His various appointments involved him in the design of Victoria station in London, Sheffield Victoria station, St Enoch station in Glasgow, Liverpool Central station and Manchester Central station. The latter station's 210-foot (64 m) wide train shed roof was the second widest unsupported iron arch in Britain after the roof of St Pancras railway station.

Fowler's consulting work extended beyond Britain including railway and engineering projects in Algeria, Australia, Belgium, Egypt, France, Germany, Portugal and the United States. He travelled to Egypt for the first time in 1869 and worked on a number of, mostly unrealised, schemes for the Khedive, including a railway to Khartoum in Sudan which was planned in 1875 but not completed until after his death. In 1870 he provided advice to an Indian Government inquiry on railway gauges where he recommended a narrow gauge of 3 feet 6 inches (1.07 m) for light railways. He visited Australia in 1886, where he made some remarks on the break of gauge difficulty. Later in his career, he was also a consultant with his partner Benjamin Baker and with James Henry Greathead on two of London's first tube railways, the City and South London Railway and the Central London Railway.

== Bridges ==
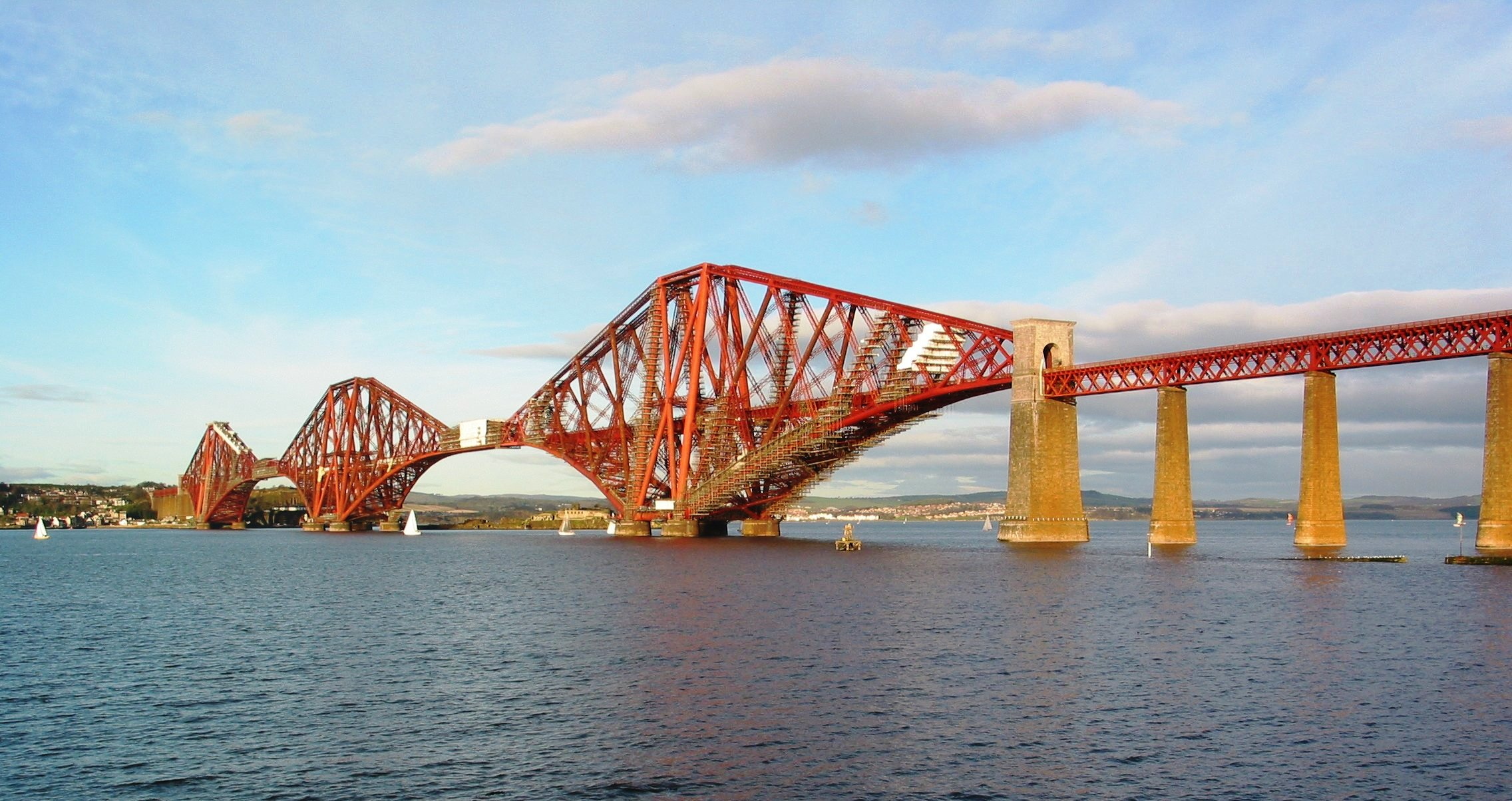
Forth Bridge

As part of his railway projects, Fowler designed numerous bridges. In the 1860s, he designed Grosvenor Bridge, the first railway bridge over the River Thames, and the 13-arch Dollis Brook Viaduct for the Edgware, Highgate and London Railway.

He is credited with the design of the Victoria Bridge at Upper Arley, Worcestershire, constructed between 1859 and 1861, and the near identical Albert Edward Bridge at Coalbrookdale, Shropshire built from 1863 to 1864. Both remain in use today carrying railway lines across the River Severn.

Following the collapse of Sir Thomas Bouch's Tay Bridge in 1879, Fowler, William Henry Barlow and Thomas Elliot Harrison were appointed in 1881 to a commission to review Bouch's design for the Forth Bridge. The commission recommended a steel cantilever bridge designed by Fowler and Benjamin Baker, which was constructed between 1883 and 1890.

== Locomotives ==
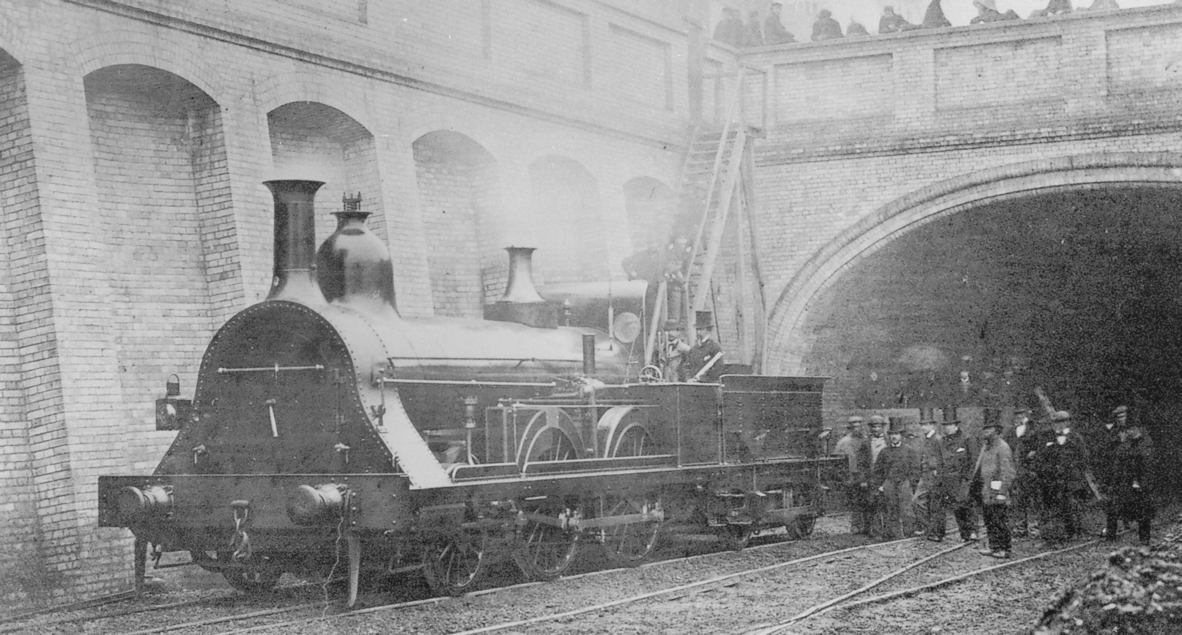
Fowler's fireless locomotive at Edgware Road, October 1862

To avoid problems with smoke and steam overwhelming staff and passengers on the covered sections of the Metropolitan Railway, Fowler proposed a fireless locomotive. The broad gauge locomotive was built by Robert Stephenson and Company and was a tender engine with a 2-4-0 wheel arrangement. The boiler had a normal firebox connected to a large combustion chamber containing fire bricks which were to act as a heat reservoir. The combustion chamber was linked to the smokebox through a set of very short firetubes. Exhaust steam was re-condensed instead of escaping and fed back to the boiler. The locomotive was intended to operate conventionally in the open, but in tunnels dampers would be closed and steam would be generated firelessly, using the stored heat from the fire bricks.

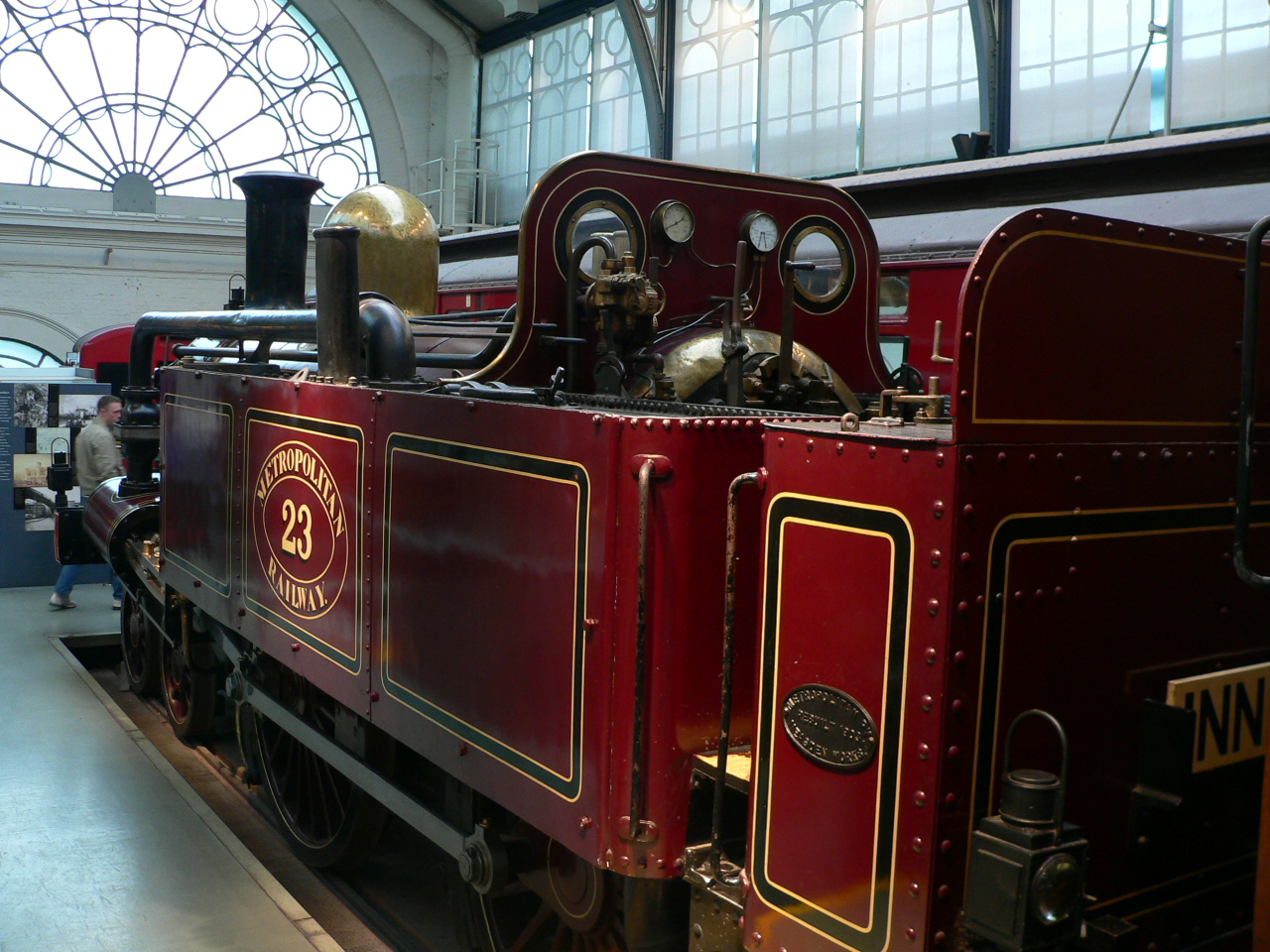
Fowler's A class locomotive

The first trial on the Great Western Railway in October 1861 was a failure. The condensing system leaked, causing the boiler to run dry and pressure to drop, risking a boiler explosion. A second trial on the Metropolitan Railway in 1862 was also a failure, and the fireless engine was abandoned, becoming known as "Fowler's Ghost". The locomotive was sold to Isaac Watt Boulton in 1865; he intended to convert it into a standard engine but it was eventually scrapped.

On opening, the Metropolitan Railway's trains were provided by the Great Western Railway, but these were withdrawn in August 1863. After a period hiring trains from the Great Northern Railway, the Metropolitan Railway introduced its own, Fowler-designed, tank engines with a 4-4-0 wheel arrangement in 1864. The design of condensing steam locomotives, known as the A class and, with minor updates, the B class, was so successful that the Metropolitan and District Railways eventually had 120 of the engines in use and they remained in operation until electrification of the lines in the 1900s. While they were not fireless, the locomotives condensed their steam, and burnt coke or smokeless coal to reduce smoke emitted.

== Other activities and professional recognition ==
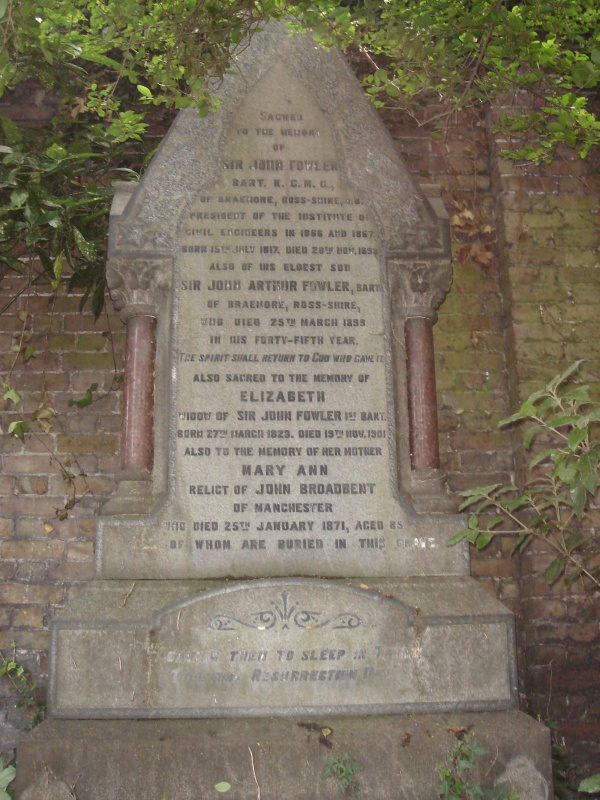
Funerary monument, Brompton Cemetery, London

Fowler stood unsuccessfully for parliament as a Conservative candidate in 1880 and 1885. His standing within the engineering profession was very high, to the extent that he was elected president of the Institution of Civil Engineers for the period 1866–67, its youngest president. Through his position in the Institution and through his own practice, he led the development of training for engineers.

In 1865/67, he purchased the adjacent estates of Braemore and Inverbroom, near Ullapool in Ross-shire, Scotland, comprising 44,000 acres and becoming one of the premier Deer Forests (sporting estates) of the Highlands. He built the substantial Braemore House (since demolished), where he entertained at the highest levels of politics and society. He developed a hydro-electric scheme, fed from the artificial Home Loch, planted extensive woodlands on the steep valley sides, and created 12 km of recreational walks through them, including suspension footbridges over the Corrieshalloch and Strone Gorges (the former now an NTS property). He also developed a network of stalkerpaths. He was appointed a Justice of the Peace and a Deputy Lieutenant of the county. Lady Fowler here became a noted botanist.

He listed his recreations in Who's Who as yachting and deerstalking and was a member of the Carlton Club, St Stephen's Club, the Conservative Club and the Royal Yacht Squadron. He was also President of the Egyptian Exploration Fund. In 1885 he was made a Knight Commander of the Order of Saint Michael and Saint George as thanks from the government for allowing the use of maps of the Upper Nile valley he had had made when working on the Khedive's projects. They were the most accurate survey of the area and were used in the British Relief of Khartoum.

In 1887 he was elected a Fellow of the Royal Society of Edinburgh. (Note: His proposers were Sir James Falshaw, James Leslie, George Miller Cunningham and Alexander Crum Brown.)

Following the successful completion of the Forth Bridge in 1890, Fowler was created Baronet Fowler of Braemor. Along with Benjamin Baker, he received an honorary degree of Doctor of Laws from the University of Edinburgh in 1890 for his engineering of the bridge. In 1892, the Poncelet Prize was doubled and awarded jointly to Baker and Fowler.

Fowler died in Bournemouth, Hampshire, at the age of 81 and is buried in Brompton Cemetery, London. He was succeeded in the baronetcy by his son John Arthur Fowler, 2nd Baronet (died 25 March 1899). The baronetcy became extinct in 1933 on the death of Reverend Montague Fowler, 4th Baronet, the first baronet's third son.

== See also ==
- Fowler baronets

== Notes ==
Professional and academic associations
Preceded by John Robinson McClean	President of the Institution of Civil Engineers; December 1865 – December 1867	Succeeded by Charles Hutton Gregory
Baronetage of the United Kingdom
New title	Baronet (of Braemore); 1890–1898	Succeeded by John Arthur Fowler
