= Fowler's Ghost =

Experimental locomotive

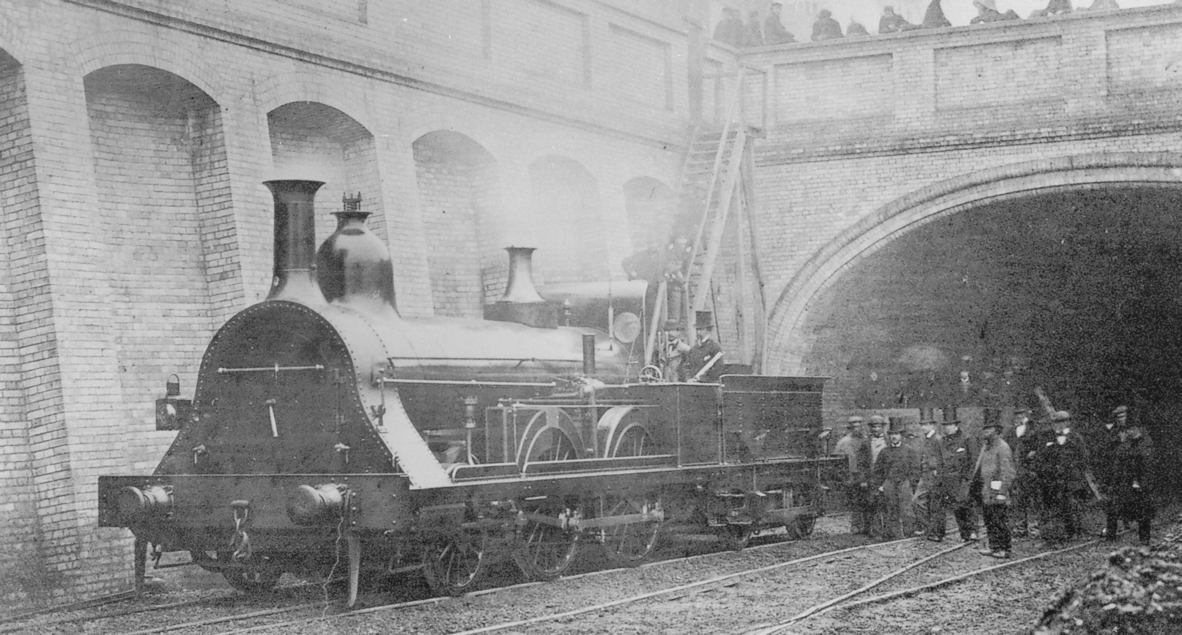
Fowler's fireless locomotive at Edgware Road, October 1862. This is the only known image of the locomotive.

"Fowler's Ghost" is the nickname given to an experimental fireless 2-4-0 steam locomotive designed by John Fowler and built in 1861 for use on the Metropolitan Railway, London's first underground railway. The broad gauge locomotive used exhaust recondensing techniques and a large quantity of fire bricks to retain heat and prevent the emission of smoke and steam in tunnels.

After trials on the Great Western Railway in 1861 and in London in 1862, the locomotive was considered a failure; on its first trial it was near to exploding, and problems with steaming and pressure retention were never overcome. The locomotive was sold in 1865 with the intention to convert it into a conventional steam engine, but it was quietly scrapped in 1895.

The locomotive was considered an embarrassment to its designer, the respected engineer John Fowler (who later designed the Forth Bridge), and its existence was denied for many years; the sobriquet "Fowler's Ghost" was given to it by The Railway Magazine in a retrospective article in January 1901, and this has subsequently become the standard reference name for the engine.

== Design ==
The Metropolitan Railway was designed to run through covered tunnels in railway cuttings. At a railway select committee in 1855, Fowler had stated his intention "to start with our boiler filled with steam and water to such capacity and of such pressure that it will take its journey from end-to-end." To avoid problems with smoke and steam overwhelming staff and passengers on the covered sections, Fowler proposed a unique fireless locomotive. However, early experiments with these steam accumulator locomotives had failed.

The locomotive was built by Robert Stephenson and Company at their works in Newcastle upon Tyne. It was built to broad gauge specification with a 2-4-0 wheel arrangement with tender. The boiler had a normal firebox connected to a large combustion chamber containing a large quantity of fire bricks which were to act as a heat reservoir.

The combustion chamber was linked to the smokebox through a set of very short firetubes. Exhaust steam was re-condensed instead of escaping and fed back to the boiler. The locomotive was intended to operate conventionally in the open, but in tunnels dampers would be closed and steam would be generated using the stored heat from the fire bricks.

== Trials ==
As the Metropolitan Railway was still two years from completion, the first trial was held on the broad gauge Great Western Railway in October 1861 on the line near Hanwell railway station. The trial was a failure, with the locomotive completing only 7.5 miles (12.1 km). The condensing system leaked, causing the boiler to run dry and the steam pressure to drop. As a result, the boiler feed-pumps jammed, creating a dangerous situation where the boiler could overheat and explode.

In conventional coal-fired locomotives, the normal procedure would be to drop the fire onto the track to prevent an explosion, but no provision had been made for discharging the fire bricks which provided most of the heat. An explosion was evidently narrowly avoided. After a second failed trial on the Metropolitan Railway between King's Cross and Edgware Road station in 1862, development work on the locomotive ceased. Cuthbert Hamilton Ellis noted that the engine "was a fine, sturdy creation, but the trouble was that her boiler not only refrained from producing smoke, it produced very little steam either."

The locomotive was sold to Isaac Watt Boulton in 1865; he intended to convert it into a standard engine, and commissioned drawings for a new conventional boiler and its conversion into standard gauge. However, the conversion was left incomplete when Boulton's locomotive-hire business ceased trading in 1894; the locomotive was eventually scrapped by Beyer, Peacock and Company in 1895.
