= Ernest L. Ahrons =

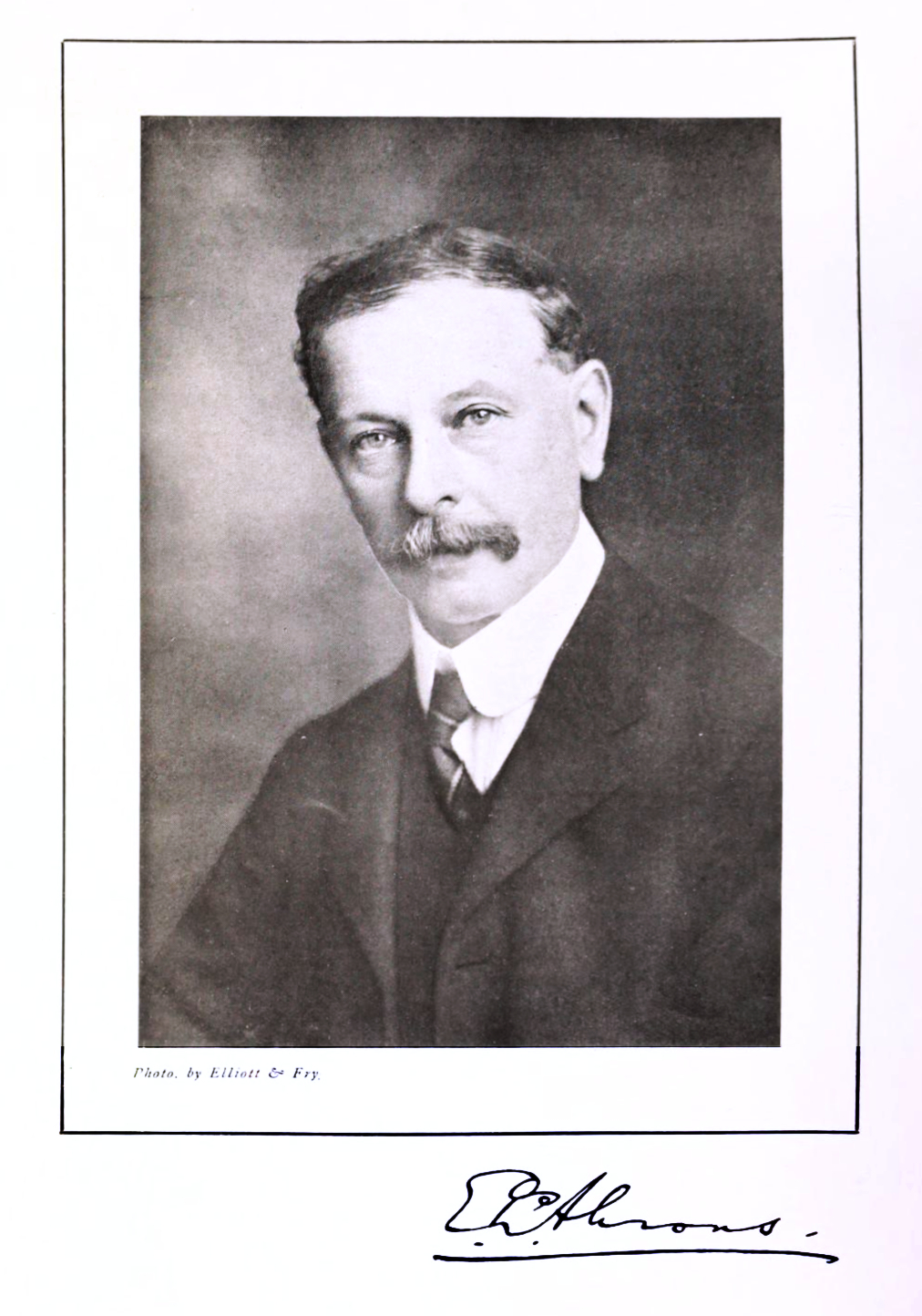

Ernest Leopold Ahrons (12 February 1866 – 30 March 1926) was a British engineer and author. He is most noted for his magnum opus, The British Steam Railway Locomotive 1825–1925, published posthumously in book form, and for a series originally published in The Railway Magazine "Locomotive and train working in the latter part of the nineteenth century".

== Biography ==
Ahrons was born in Bradford on 12 February 1866. He worked for the Great Western Railway at its Swindon Works between 1885 and 1890 and then held various engineering posts in Manchester and Egypt and for the British Government up to 1919; he then became a full-time author.

In 1925, The Engineer published a series of articles by Ahrons titled "The British Steam Railway Locomotive from 1825 to 1924", and Ahrons intended to subsequently publish them in book form, taking the story to the end of 1925, but he died on 30 March 1926. The articles were prepared by others for the book which was published in 1927.

== Notable publications ==
- Ahrons, E. L. (1910). Lubrication of Locomotives. Amen Corner, London: Locomotive Publishing.
- — (1914). The Development of British Locomotive Design. Amen Corner, London: Locomotive Publishing.
- — (1921). The Steam Railway Locomotive. Pitman's Technical Primer Series. Vol. 1. London: Pitman.
- — (1921). Steam Locomotive Construction and Maintenance. Pitman's Technical Primer Series. Vol. 2. London: Pitman. OCLC 12610831.
- — (1927). The British Steam Railway Locomotive 1825-1925. Amen Corner, London: Locomotive Publishing Co. OCLC 2329259. OL 6715902M.
- — (1952). Locomotive and Train Working in the Latter Part of the Nineteenth Century. Vol. (Six volumes). Cambridge: W. Heffer.
