= West Dulwich railway station =

National Rail station in London, England

West Dulwich
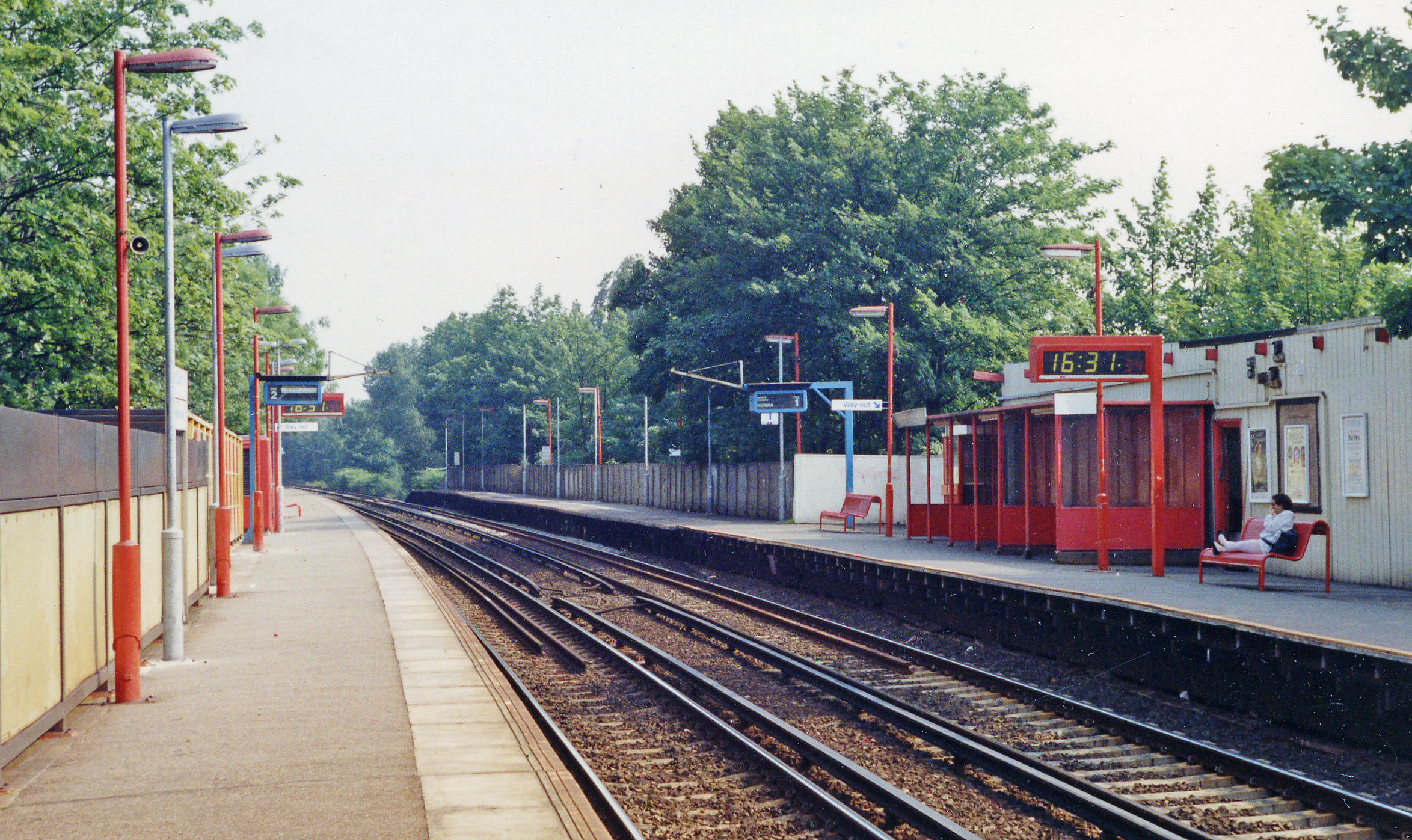
- Interactive map of West Dulwich

General information
- Location: Dulwich
- Local authority: London Borough of Southwark
- Managed by: Southeastern
- Station code: WDU
- DfT category: E
- Number of platforms: 2
- Fare zone: 3

National Rail annual entry and exit
- 2020–21: ▼0.249 million
- 2021–22: ▲0.628 million
- 2022–23: ▲0.724 million
- 2023–24: ▲0.854 million
- 2024–25: ▲0.864 million

Key dates
- October 1863: Opened as "Dulwich"
- 1926: Renamed "West Dulwich"

Other information
- External links: Departures; Facilities
- Coordinates: 51.4409°N 0.0906°W

West Dulwich railway station is on the Chatham Main Line in England, serving the West Dulwich area in the London Borough of Southwark, south London. It is located on opposite side of the south circular road from Belair Park, 5 miles 2 chains (8.1 km) down the line from London Victoria and between Herne Hill and Sydenham Hill. The station and all services are operated by Southeastern.

== History ==
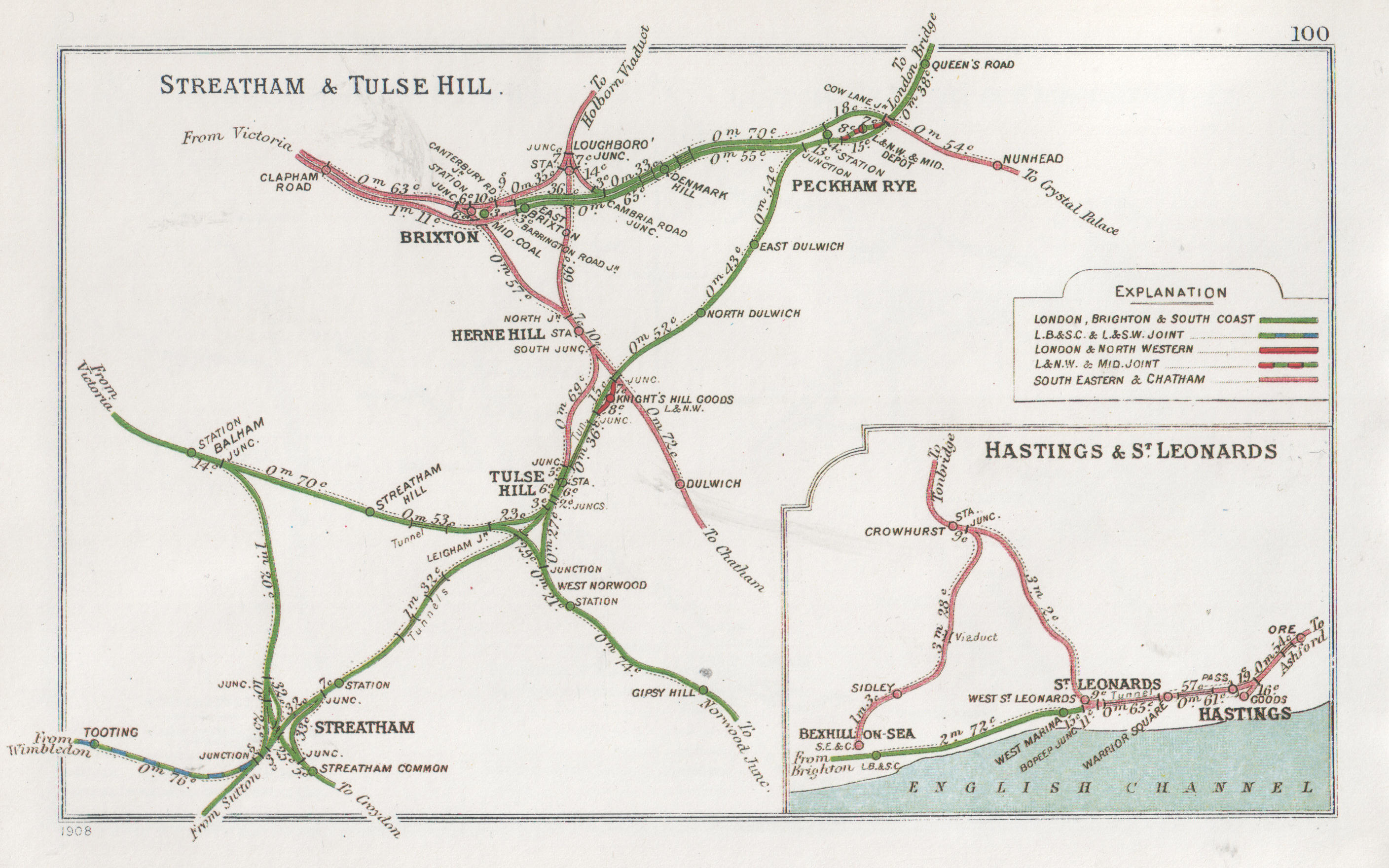
A 1908 Railway Clearing House map of lines around West Dulwich railway station.

The line from Herne Hill to Beckenham Junction was built by the London, Chatham and Dover Railway (LCDR) and opened in 1863. The station was opened as "Dulwich" in the same year. The prefix "West" was added in 1926. The local area was flooded after the Dulwich Estate lost a court case in which they claimed part of the station was part of their network of drainage canals.

== Services ==
All services at West Dulwich are operated by Southeastern using Class 465 and 466 EMUs.

The typical off-peak service in trains per hour is:

- 4 tph to London Victoria via Herne Hill
- 4 tph to Orpington via Bromley South

Additional services, including trains between Beckenham Junction and London Blackfriars call at the station during the peak hours.

On weekends, the service is reduced to two trains per hour in each direction.

Preceding station	National Rail	Following station
Herne Hill	Southeastern Bromley South Line	Sydenham Hill

== Connections ==
London Buses route P13 serves the station, with nearby bus stop Croxted Road/Thurlow Park Road serving London Buses route 3 and London Buses route 201, as well as night route London Buses route N3.

The station is located 5 miles away from London Victoria station.
