= Isaac Watt Boulton =

- Born: 1823; Stockport
- Died: 1899 (Age 76)
- Spouse: Ann
- Children: Thomas (Son), William (Son), Helena (Daughter), James W.(Son).
- Parent: John Boulton (Father)

Isaac Watt Boulton (1823–1899) was a British engineer and founder of the locomotive-hire business known as Boulton's Siding.

== Family history ==
Isaac Boulton was born at Stockport. He was the son of John Boulton of Glossop who was related to Matthew Boulton of Boulton and Watt fame. Isaac had 3 sons named Thomas, Wiliam and James Watt Boulton. He had one daughter named Helena.

== Career ==
In 1841 I. W. Boulton began an apprenticeship with the Sheffield, Ashton-under-Lyne and Manchester Railway under Richard Peacock. Later, he joined his father's canal boat business and remained there until 1845.

After this he set up an engineering business but little is known about it except that he built at least one steam carriage (probably similar to those built by Richard Trevithick and Goldsworthy Gurney) and at least one steamboat.

In 1854 he joined the locomotive department of the Manchester, Sheffield and Lincolnshire Railway at Gorton. He left in 1856 and set up another engineering business at Portland Street, Ashton-under-Lyne, where he built and repaired steam engines of various kinds.

In 1858–1859 he bought three second-hand railway locomotives (2-2-0 tender engines built by Bury) and started to hire them out for temporary jobs. The locomotive-hire side of the business grew and so a connection to the nearest railway line was needed. This led, in 1864, to the construction of Boulton's Siding, alongside the Oldham branch of the Manchester, Sheffield and Lincolnshire Railway.

In 1867, one of Boulton's carriages won what is considered to be the world's first race of two self-powered road vehicles.

== Sources ==
- The Chronicles of Boulton's Siding, by Alfred Rosling Bennett, first published by the Locomotive Publishing Company in 1927, new impression by David & Charles 1971, ISBN 0-7153-5318-7
