= Roger Kidner =

British railway enthusiast and publisher (1914–2007)

Roger Wakeley Kidner
- Born: 16 March 1914; Sidcup, Kent, England
- Died: 14 September 2007; Aberystwyth, Wales
- Occupations: Author; publisher; public relations; photographer
- Years active: 1931–2015
- Known for: The Oakwood Press

Roger Wakeley Kidner (1914–2007) was a railway enthusiast and noted publisher whose imprint, The Oakwood Press, published many of the earliest books on British narrow-gauge railways.

== Biography ==
Kidner was born on 16 March 1914, the son of civil servant Arthur, and Mabel. His love of railways stemmed from being given a few Locomotive Publishing Company postcards in primary school. He attended Westminster School where he struck up a friendship with Michael Robbins. The two bonded over a shared interest in railways, and in 1931, they founded The Four Os to publish a newsletter called Locomotion. Both were still at school, and the company operated out of Kidner's parents' garage.

In 1935, Kidner and Robbins changed the name of their nascent publishing house to The Oakwood Press and published their first book, Railway Bibliography by Canon Fellows. This was followed in 1936 by L.T. Catchpole's The Lynton and Barnstaple Railway which is still in print in its 9th edition. Meanwhile, after a year at the London School of Economics Kidner was working as an editor of travel guides for Benn Brothers. In 1938, Oakwood published the first train spotter's guide, called How to Recognise Southern Railway Locomotives written by Kidner.

Kidner travelled widely to research the railways that his authors wrote about. He visited the Lynton and Barnstaple Railway in 1935 with Catchpole, and the Welsh Highland Railway in 1926 and 1934.

The Oakwood Press suspended publication during the Second World War, and Kidner served in the Queen's Own Royal West Kent Regiment where he rose to the rank of Major. He also married Beryl Walton in 1943. The couple had two sons, Richard (b.1945) and Timothy (b.1947). After the war he resumed publishing, though was initially restricted by paper rationing. He published James I. C. Boyd's seminal series on the narrow-gauge railways of north Wales, starting in 1949 with Narrow Gauge Rails to Portmadoc which drew attention to the then-closed Ffestiniog Railway and was instrumental in its eventual restoration. Michael Robbins dropped out of the business in the 1950s.

In 1972, Kidner retired from his work in public relations to focus full-time on The Oakwood Press. He broadened the range of subjects covered, to include biographies of railwaymen and books about trams, traction engines, buses and canals. He sold The Oakwood Press in 1984, but kept in close contact with the new owner, writing and editing books. He died of cancer in 2007.

== Works ==
- Kidner, R.W. (1938). How to Recognise Southern Railway Locomotives. The Oakwood Press.
- — — (1937) The Narrow Gauge Railways of North Wales. Light Railway Handbooks No. 2. The Oakwood Press.
- —— (1946). The Early History of the Motor Car 1769–1897. The Oakwood Press.
- —— (1953). The South Eastern Railway. The Oakwood Press.
- Dendy Marshall, C.F.; Kidner, Roger W. (1963) [1937]. History of the Southern Railway (2nd ed.). Ian Allan.
- —— (1965). The Cambrian Railways. The Oakwood Press.
- —— (1966). The Dartford Loop Line. The Oakwood Press. Locomotion Papers no. 34.
- —— (1972). The Oxted Line. The Oakwood Press. Locomotion Papers no. 58.
- —— (1974). The Reading to Tonbridge Line. The Oakwood Press.
- —— (1974). Southern Railway Rolling Stock. The Oakwood Press. Locomotion Papers no. 74.
- —— (1 January 1975). Military Traction Engines and Lorries, 1858–1918. The Oakwood Press.
- —— (1975) [1950]. The London Motor-Bus 1896–1975 (5th ed.). The Oakwood Press. Locomotion Papers no. 5.
- —— (1 May 1977). Rhymney Railway. The Oakwood Press.
- —— (1977). North Kent Line. The Oakwood Press.
- —— (1 March 1978). Romney, Hythe and Dymchurch Railway. The Oakwood Press.
- ——; Riley, R.C. (1979). The Newhaven and Seaford Branch. The Oakwood Press. Locomotion Papers no. 107.
- —— (31 January 1981). Minor Standard Gauge Railways. The Oakwood Press.
- —— (30 June 1982). Private and Untimetabled Railway Stations. The Oakwood Press.
- —— (31 December 1982). The Waterloo-Southampton Line. The Oakwood Press.
- —— (1 January 1984). Southern Railway Branch Line Trains. The Oakwood Press.
- —— (31 January 1984). Southern Suburban Steam. The Oakwood Press.
- —— (31 October 1985). Southern Railway Halts: Survey and Gazetteer. The Oakwood Press.
- —— (13 July 1987). Pullman Cars on the Southern, 1875–1972. The Oakwood Press.
- —— (12 October 1993). Service Stock of the Southern Railway: Its Constituents and BR Southern Region. The Oakwood Press.
- —— (31 October 1995). Aberdare Railway. The Oakwood Press.
- —— (23 September 1998). Pullman Trains of Great Britain. The Oakwood Press.
- —— (20 April 2000). Railways of Purbeck. The Oakwood Press.
- —— (30 May 2003). The Mid-Wales Railway. The Oakwood Press.
- ——. The London Tramcar 1861–1952. The Oakwood Press.
