= C. F. Dendy Marshall =

English railway historian and philatelist

Chapman Frederick Dendy Marshall (15 November 1872 – 14 June 1945) was an English railway historian, best known for his works on the Southern Railway and its precursor companies; on the Liverpool and Manchester Railway; and on early railways and locomotives to 1831. He was also a noted philatelist who was a specialist in the stamps and postal history of Great Britain.

In 1928, Dendy Marshall was awarded the Crawford Medal by the Royal Philatelic Society London for his work The British Post Office from its Beginnings to the End of 1925.

Dendy Marshall was a member of the Royal Aeronautical Society and the Institution of Locomotive Engineers. He was also the holder of one of the first British driving licences.

== Life ==
Dendy Marshall's birth was registered at Brentford in the fourth quarter of 1872. He was educated at Hurstpierpoint and Trinity College, Cambridge, and trained as a barrister but never practised.

He died at his home Chinthurst Lodge, Wonersh, in Surrey on 14 June 1945 at age 72. His collection of railway documents and memorabilia was auctioned at Sotheby's on 13 November that same year.

== Railway publications ==
- Two Essays in early locomotive history: 1. The first hundred railway engines; 2. British locomotives in North America, London: The Locomotive Publishing Company Ltd 1928.
- Centenary history of the Liverpool and Manchester Railway, London: Locomotive Publishing Co. 1930.
- One hundred years of railways: from Liverpool and Manchester to London Midland and Scottish, London and Derby: London, Midland and Scottish Railway. 1930.
- A history of the Southern Railway, London: Southern Railway. 1936. Second edition, revised by R.W. Kidner. London: Ian Allan. 2 vols. 1963.
- A history of British railways down to the year 1830, London: Oxford University Press. 1938.
- Early British locomotives: a supplement to the first of the author's "Two essays in early locomotive history", London: Locomotive Publishing Co. 1939.
- A history of railway locomotives down to the end of the year 1831, London: Locomotive Publishing Co. 1953.

== Philatelic publications ==
- Numbered obliterations of the London and suburban districts. Buckingham: P.E. Raynor, 1923.
- The British Post Office from its beginnings to the end of 1925. Oxford University Press, 1926.
- A study of the line-engraved twopence postage stamps of Great Britain. London: Harris Publications, 1929.
