= Locomotive Publishing Company =

English publisher specialising in railway topics

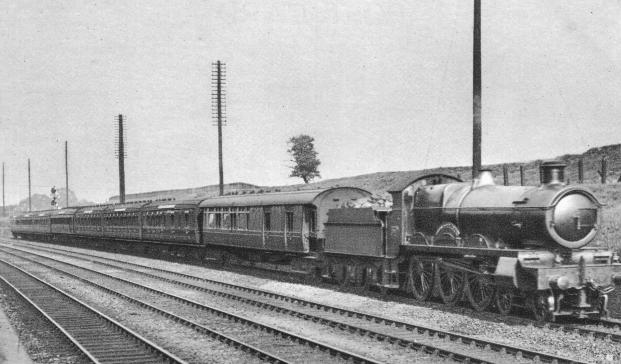
Cornish Riviera Express around 1910, on a Locomotive Publishing Co. postcard

The Locomotive Publishing Company was an English publishing house, specialising in railway topics. It was noted for publishing Locomotive Magazine, amongst many other highly regarded titles. It was also notable as one of the first stock photo libraries, in this case specialising in railway images.

== History ==
The company was preceded in the final years of the 19th century by 'F. Moore', a railway artist and photographer who published Moore's Monthly Magazine, the first widely popular railway magazine. In actuality, 'F. Moore' was the pseudonymous pen-name for two brothers, A.R. Bell and A. Morton Bell, both apprentices at the Stratford Works of the Great Eastern Railway.

They began as a photo library, trading between the increasing number of amateur photographers of railways and the growing interest of enthusiasts. A third brother, Walter John Bell, and another apprentice, A.C.W. Lowe, became involved from 1896 with the launch of Moore's Monthly Magazine. From the 13th issue in January 1897, this was renamed as The Locomotive Magazine.

The Locomotive Publishing Company Limited was established in 1899. It began at 9 South Place, Finsbury, moving within the year to 102 Charing Cross Road and in 1903 to their better known long-term address of 3 Amen Corner, London. Amen Corner is at the west end of Paternoster Row where it joins Ave Maria Lane, near St Paul's Cathedral. Paternoster Row was long associated with the publishing trade in London. This building had been built as a residence in the 17th century, during the great rebuilding of the area after the 1666 Great Fire. After being bombed out during the London Blitz of 1940, they moved to Horseferry Road.

In 1956, (Note: 1951, per) the company was sold to another publisher specialising in railways, Ian Allan, and relocated to Surrey. This sale had been precipitated by the death duties owing after the death of one of the three partners, W.G. Tilling.

In 1992 the archive, together with its associated rights, was acquired by the National Railway Museum, with the assistance of the National Heritage Memorial Fund.

== Notable people ==
=== Bell, Alfred Robert ===
One of the two founding brothers, and editor of the Locomotive Magazine. Of the brothers, he was the one who dedicated most of his career to the publishing company. "A man of huge girth with a mass of white hair".

=== Bell, Arthur Morton ===
Although one of the initial two brothers behind the publishing company, he focused on his engineering career. After serving an apprenticeship at the GER's Stratford Works, he rose to a position of some seniority in the locomotive department. He was involved in the trials of Holden's oil-burning locomotives and this work on oil firing would be a theme for the rest of his career, around the world; at the Kursk, Kharkov and Sevastopol Railway, the Austrian State Railways, the railways of Sicily, and, in the United States, on the Pennsylvania, the California Southern, and the Los Angeles Terminal. In 1897 he was appointed the first manager of the GER's new wagon shops at Temple Mills. By 1900, he joined the Shell company and traveled throughout Europe, Turkey and Egypt as a consultant for oil fuels. In 1903 he was appointed Carriage and Wagon Superintendent of the Great Indian Peninsula Railway, a post that he held until 1924. For his war work during World War I, when Stratford Works was employed on munitions work, he was awarded the OBE in 1919.

He was elected a Member of the ILocoE Council in 1924, and later made a vice-president.

He was a frequent contributor to the Locomotive Magazine. He also wrote Locomotives: their Construction, Maintenance and Operation, although published by Virtue rather than Locomotive Publishing. It was published only a few months before his death, on 10 February 1936 at home in Hampstead when aged 72 years.

=== Bell, Walter John ===
The third of the brothers to join, he became the fourth partner in 1896 with the formation of the company. His professional career remained focussed on engineering though, particularly through a long career with Taike and Carlton Ltd. of Victoria Street, London. He was also one of the founding members of the Institution of Locomotive Engineers. His publishing career included being the Consulting Editor of The Locomotive. In addition he authored a number of books on locomotive engineering and on railway history, some co-authored with A.C.W. Lowe.

Died 18 September 1938 at Malden, Kingston upon Thames, aged 64.

=== A.C.W. Lowe ===
A.C.W. Lowe was one of the original founders of the company. A graduate of Trinity College, Cambridge, he lived at Gosfield Hall, Halstead, Essex. The extent of his involvement with the magazine was extensive, although now difficult to ascertain. He may have been an initial financial backer, and remained a major shareholder. His extensive writing for the magazine was anonymous, although he is known to have written a long and notable series of articles on Great Eastern locomotives, published between 1901 and 1913. He also acted as proofreader for The Locomotive, throughout his life. He died on 3 February 1942, aged 76.

=== Tilling, William George ===
Tilling was a trained printer, rather than a railwayman, and became a director of the Locomotive Publishing Co. He took a keen amateur interest in railways though and was an early member of the Institution of Locomotive Engineers. He wrote a number of monographs on locomotives, The Locomotives of the London, Brighton & South Coast Railway (1920) and the three-volume Locomotives of the Southern Railway.

He died on 25 July 1956. This death precipitated the sale to Ian Allan by the two remaining partners.

Tilling was a freemason and also wrote A Short History of the Lodge of St. James, No. 765: 1859-1959. This was completed after his death by Gilbert Fabes and published posthumously.

== Photo library ==
From the very first, the publishing company operated as one of the first specialist photo libraries. Railway photography was increasing in popularity at this time, both by photographers and in demand for their work. Many of these photographers were amateurs, with a keen interest in both photography and their railway subject matter, but without the commercial focus to make a full-time career of it. The Locomotive Publishing Co. acted as a clearing house between them and publishers, offering one of the first of such commercial opportunities for such part-time, although skilled, photographers.

LPC initially issued its photographs as 10×8" and 8½×6½" prints or as 'cartes de visite'. Postcards were increasingly popular around this period, with the increase in mass holidays and excursions, themselves reliant on the expanding railway traffic. The company also began to sell photographs as postcards, particularly as themed sets. Some works, particularly for the more populist photographs were coloured. (Note: The monochrome photographs were hand-coloured, but were then printed as coloured lithographs.) Some paintings were drawn or painted directly, particularly by John Rudd, another artist working under the 'F Moore' pseudonym.

The LPC archive now forms part of the collection of the National Railway Museum.

== Notable publications ==
- Ahrons, E. L. (1914). The Development of British Locomotive Design. Amen Corner, London: Locomotive Publishing Co.
- Ahrons, E.L. (1927). The British Steam Railway Locomotive 1825-1925. Amen Corner, London: Locomotive Publishing Co.
- Bennett, Alfred Rosling (1927). The Chronicles of Boulton's Siding. Amen Corner, London: Locomotive Publishing Co.
- Dendy Marshall, C. F. (1930). Centenary history of the Liverpool and Manchester Railway. Locomotive Publishing Co.
- Holcroft, H. (1957). Great Western Locomotive Practice 1837–1947. Locomotive Publishing Co.
