= Alfred Rosling Bennett =

English engineer (1850–1928)

Alfred Rosling Bennett (1850 in Islington, London – 24 May 1928 in Matlock, Derbyshire) was an English electrical engineer and writer.

== Career ==
A. R. Bennett studied at Belle Vue Academy, Greenwich, London. He then took a job with the Indian government telegraph department.

He returned to Britain in 1873 and was responsible for pioneering work in incandescent electric lighting in the early 1880s. He also patented an iron-alkali battery, a ceramic telegraph insulator and a telephone transformer.

In 1895 he established a telephone system in Guernsey and later became engineer to the municipal telephone systems in Glasgow, Tunbridge Wells, Portsmouth, Brighton and Hull. He was also the first Engineer Manager of the States of Jersey Telephone Department (now Jersey Telecom) when it took over the system from the GPO in 1923.

He had a lifelong interest in railways and was vice-president of the Institution of Locomotive Engineers in 1915.

== Books ==
A. R. Bennett wrote several books, including:

- The First Railway in London (the London and Greenwich Railway)
- Historic Locomotives
- London and Londoners in the 1850s and 1860s
- A Saga of Guernsey
- The Telephone Systems of the Continent of Europe
- The Chronicles of Boulton's Siding

== Sources ==
- Introduction by John Marshall to "The Chronicles of Boulton's Siding" by Alfred Rosling Bennett, published by David & Charles, 1971, ISBN 0-7153-5318-7
