= Camden Road railway station (Midland Railway) =

Disused railway station in England

Camden Road
- Interactive map of Camden Road

General information
- Location: Kentish Town
- Local authority: London Borough of Camden
- Grid reference: TQ294847
- Number of platforms: 4

Railway companies
- Original company: Midland Railway

Key dates
- 13 July 1868: Opened
- 1 January 1916: Closed

Other information
- Coordinates: 51.54592°N 0.1335°W

Camden Road railway station was the first station by that name in Camden, North London. Opened by the Midland Railway in 1868, it was immediately to the north of the 205 yard Camden Tunnels on the Midland Main Line and the first stop from St Pancras station.

In 1870 the North London Railway opened its Camden station, then called 'Camden Town', half a mile to the south west.. This should not be confused with Camden Town Underground station which opened in 1907. It was not until 1950 that there stopped being two 'Camden Town' stations, when the North London Railway station was renamed 'Camden Road'.

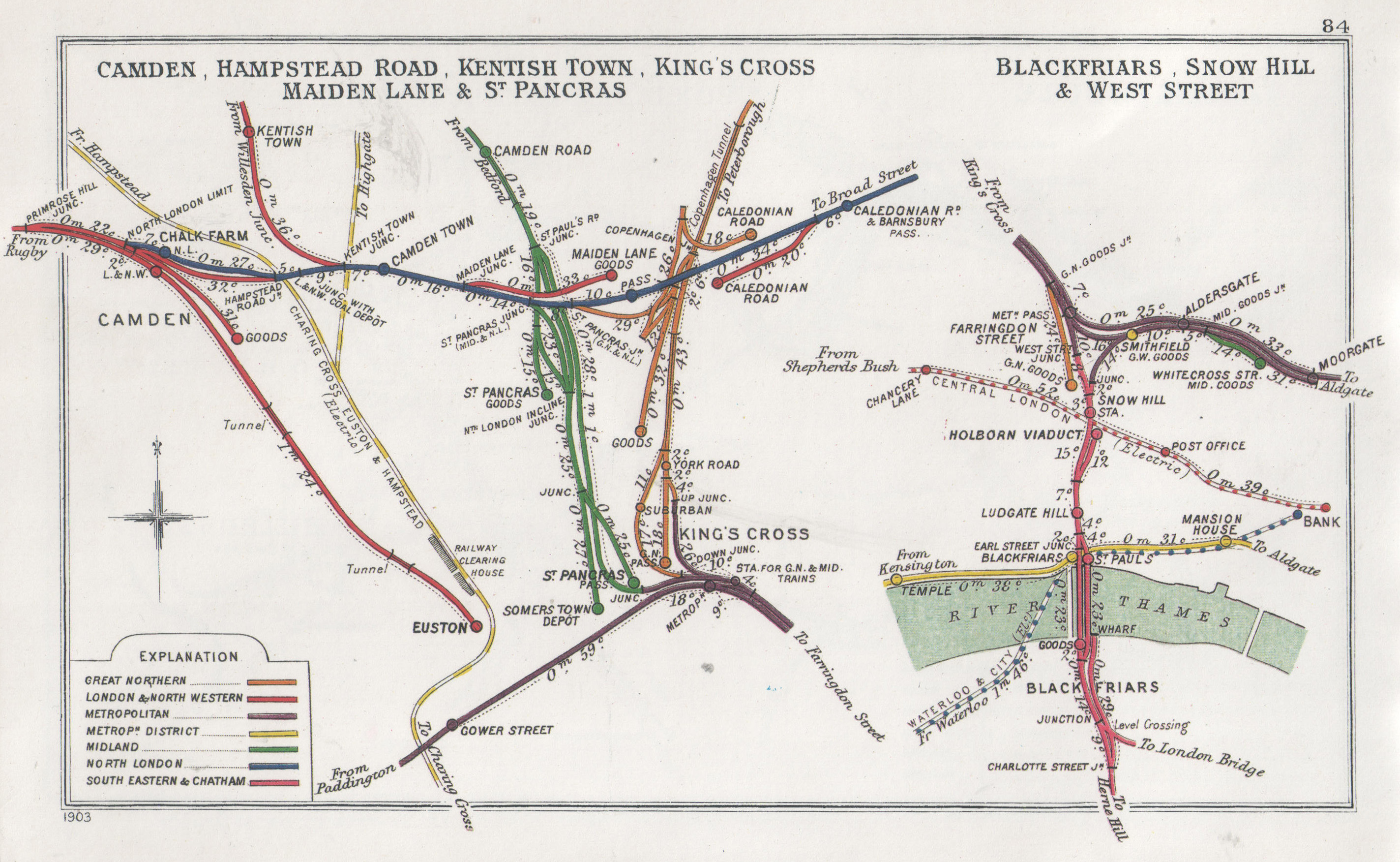
Railway Clearing House diagram of lines around Camden in 1903

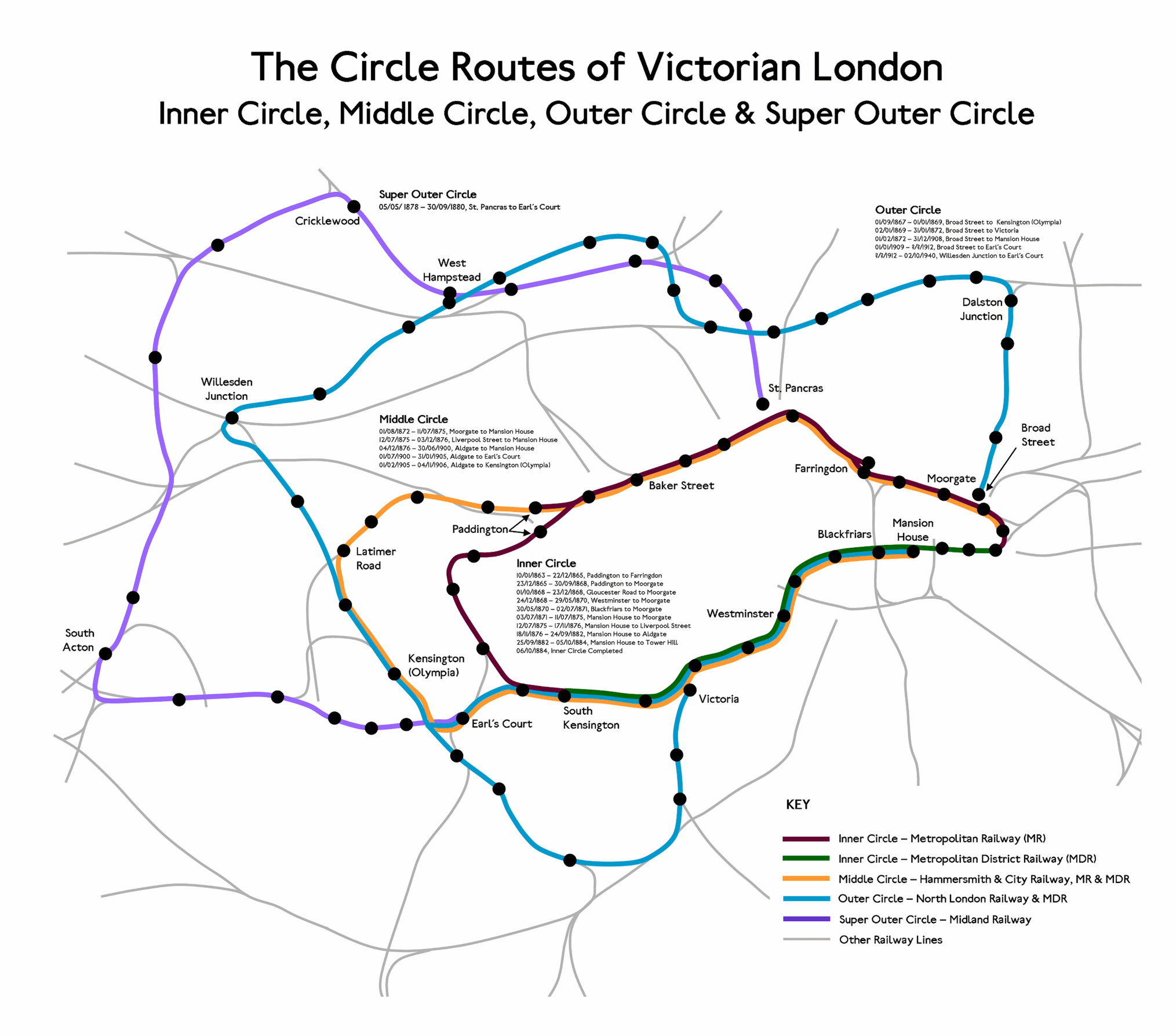
The Victorian Super Outer Circle route, passing through Camden Road (Midland) station

For a short period from 1878 and 1880, the MR operated the Super Outer Circle service through the station from St. Pancras to Earl's Court Underground station via tracks through Cricklewood, then using the Dudding Hill Line to South Acton and Hammersmith.

The station was closed, as were others, in 1916 as a wartime economy measure, and was not re-opened. The station buildings remained for many years before being replaced by a petrol station, and later by a car showroom.

Preceding station	Disused railways	Following station
Kentish Town; Line and station open	Midland Railway; Midland Main Line	St Pancras; Line and station open
Kentish Town; Line and station open	Midland Railway; Widened Lines	King's Cross; Line open, station closed
