= Baby Deltic =

Baby Deltic may refer to:

- British Rail Class 23 locomotive
- Napier Deltic T9-29 engine used to power them, a half-sized variant of the original Deltic engine
