= British Rail Class 23 =

Class of diesel-electric locomotives

English Electric Type 2 British Rail Class 23
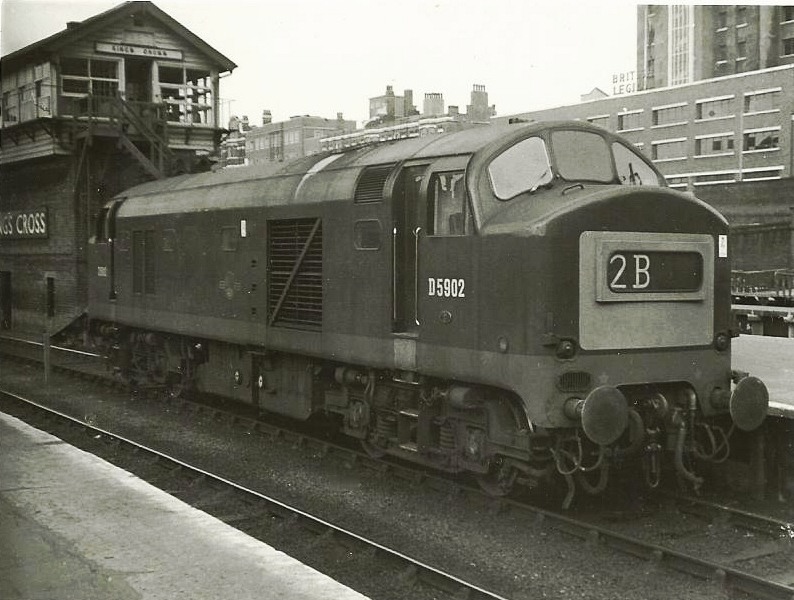
- "Baby Deltic" D5902 at King's Cross, 1966.
Type and origin
- Power type: Diesel-electric
- Builder: English Electric at Vulcan Foundry
- Build date: 1959
- Total produced: 10
Specifications
- Configuration
  - UIC: Bo'Bo'
  - Commonwealth: Bo-Bo
- Gauge: 4 ft 8 1/2 in (1,435 mm) standard gauge
- Wheel diameter: 3 ft 7 in (1.092 m)
- Minimum curve: 4 chains (80 m)
- Wheelbase: 40 ft 6 in (12.34 m)
- Length: 52 ft 6 in (16.00 m)
- Width: 8 ft 10 3/4 in (2.71 m)
- Height: 12 ft 8 in (3.86 m)
- Loco weight: 74 long tons (75.2 t; 82.9 short tons)
- Fuel capacity: 550 imp gal (2,500 L; 660 US gal)
- Prime mover: Napier T9-29 Deltic
- Generator: DC
- Traction motors: DC
- Transmission: Diesel electric
- MU working: ★ Blue star
- Train heating: Steam
- Train brakes: Vacuum
Performance figures
- Maximum speed: 75 mph (121 km/h)
- Power output: Engine: 1,100 hp (820 kW)
- Tractive effort: Maximum: 47,000 lbf (209.1 kN)
- Brakeforce: 360 kN (36 long tons-force)
Career
- Operators: British Railways
- Numbers: D5900–D5909
- Nicknames: Baby Deltic
- Axle load class: Route availability 5
- Withdrawn: 1968–1971
- Disposition: All 10 original locomotives scrapped, one new member being built

The British Rail Class 23 were a class of ten Bo-Bo diesel-electric locomotives built by the English Electric Company (EE) in 1959. The power unit used was a Napier Deltic T9-29 9-cylinder engine of 1,100 bhp (820 kW) driving an EE generator, which powered the four traction motors. They were numbered from D5900 to D5909.

The T9-29 diesel engine was a single, half-sized version of those used in the more powerful British Rail Class 55 'Deltic' locomotives, and the overall design and external appearance of the Class 23 was also similar to the Class 55, but much shorter, leading to their nickname of Baby Deltics.

== Introduction and service history ==
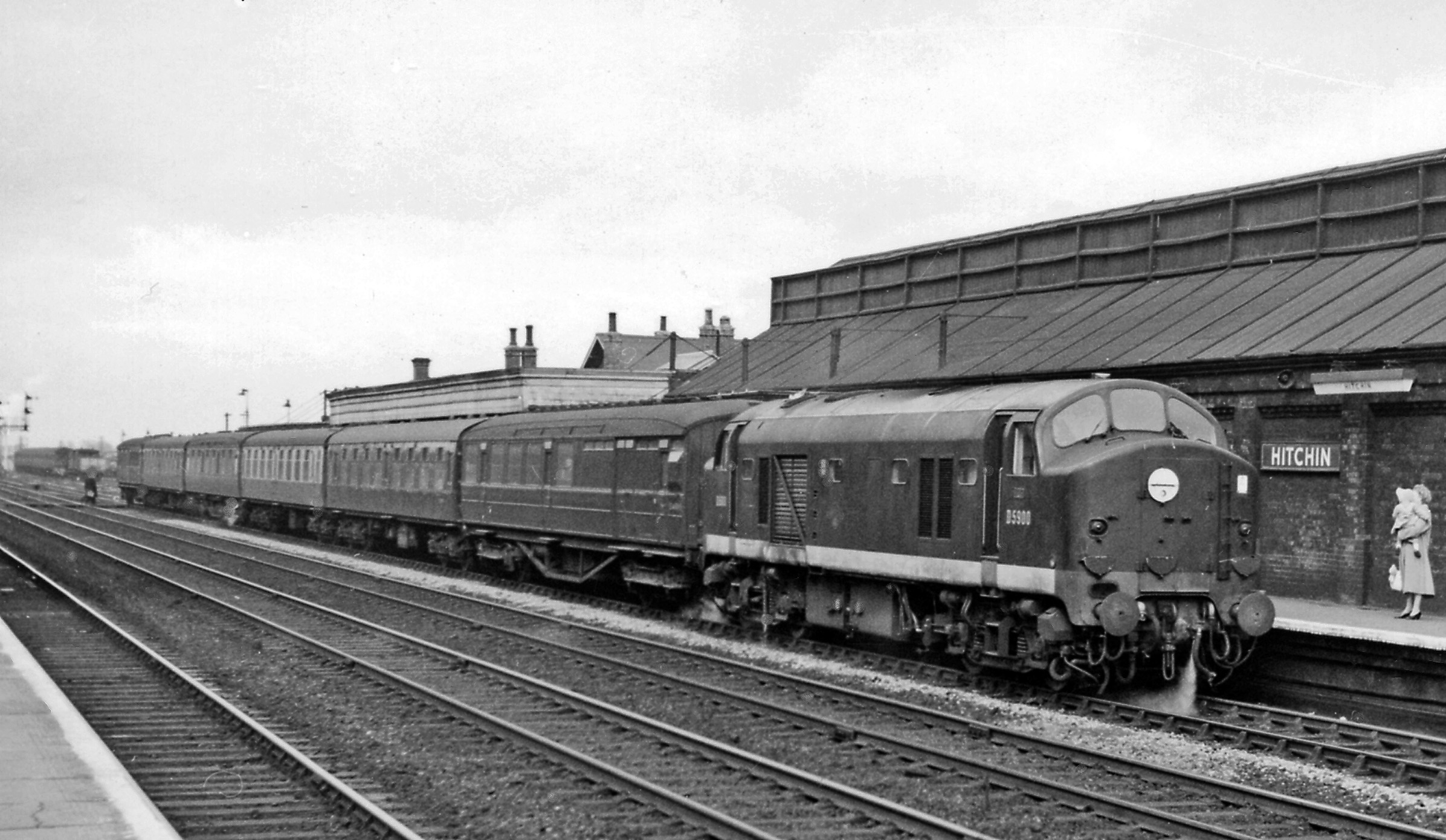
D5900 in 1961 without yellow ends or headcode boxes.

On initial completion, the first locomotives were found to weigh 3 long tons (3.05 t; 3.36 short tons) over the specification weight of 72 long tons (73.2 t; 80.6 short tons). A programme of lightening was begun: some of this involved cutting circular lightening holes into the bogie frames, and replacing steel buffer beams or roof panels with aluminium. Much of the over-weight was due to ancillary components, particularly the train-heating steam generators, being supplied over weight. To avoid waste, these components were replaced by lighter versions from other makers, but the heavier originals were then used in the Class 20 and Class 40 locomotives. The lightened locomotives eventually met British Rail's approval, but only after a painstaking weighing that involved specifying the amount of sand in the sandboxes and other precise details.

After acceptance trials at Doncaster, they entered service between April and June 1959. They were based at Hornsey, although at weekends were usually located at Hitchin engine shed. It had been British Rail's original intention to work the locos across London on the Widened Lines but the locomotives were found to be too heavy. The first of the class was held at Vulcan Foundry whilst EE tried to reduce the weight but this could not be completed to a satisfactory standard.

=== Operation ===
The locomotives were put to work on London King's Cross outer suburban duties such as the Cambridge Buffet Express as well as services from Kings Cross to Moorgate sub-surface platforms via the 'widened lines' (more recently, part of Thameslink). The locomotives were later banned from Moorgate because of excessive exhaust smoke in the tunnels.

Other services entrusted to the class were race specials run from King's Cross to race meetings at Newmarket.

=== Technical, design and reliability problems ===
Initial problems with the locomotives were minor and varied, although a problem with cracking in the cylinder liner around the injector hole required the engine to be changed. By November 1959, seven engines had been changed and this reduced availability first raised comparisons with the better reliability of the British Rail Class 24 Type 2. The Type 2s were averaging 30,000–40,000 miles per failure, the Baby Deltic less than a quarter of this. Although they suffered problems with the cylinder liners that were not dissimilar to those of the Class 55 Deltics, most of the Class 23's early problems were a variety of failures with the engine ancillaries. The auxiliary gearbox used to drive the compressor and cooling fans was a particular problem, suffering from vibration in its geartrain and a resonant whirling in the long drive shaft to it at particular rpm. Many engines seized because this shaft driving the auxiliaries snapped and then whipped round, rupturing coolant hoses and causing overheating.

By October 1960 the emphasis of failures had shifted from the ancillaries to the engine itself. Locomotive mileages had only reached 40,000–60,000 miles each, including stoppages, whilst in this 18 months there had been 44 engine changes across only 10 locomotives. Despite a generous availability of spare engines, four of the ten locomotives were out of service at the time. Four main engine problems had been identified:

- Fractured cylinder liners from the injector hole, caused by assembly stresses.
- Fractured cylinder liners from the injector hole, caused by electrolytic corrosion.
- Turbocharger bearing failures, caused by exhaust gases leaking through the labyrinth seals.
- Seized pistons, due to poor cooling caused by chemical erosion from incorrect lubricants.

In July 1961 BR suggested replacing the Napier engine with an English Electric 8SVT V8. This would however have added eight tons in extra weight, and so was rejected. EE also pointed out that the locomotives were now highly reliable in general, except when a major failure required the considerable downtime for an engine change.

By around 1963 all the locomotives had gradually been moved to Stratford Depot as they failed and were added to the line in store, pending a decision on their future. By this time the locos were based at the new diesel maintenance depot at Finsbury Park.

=== Modification ===
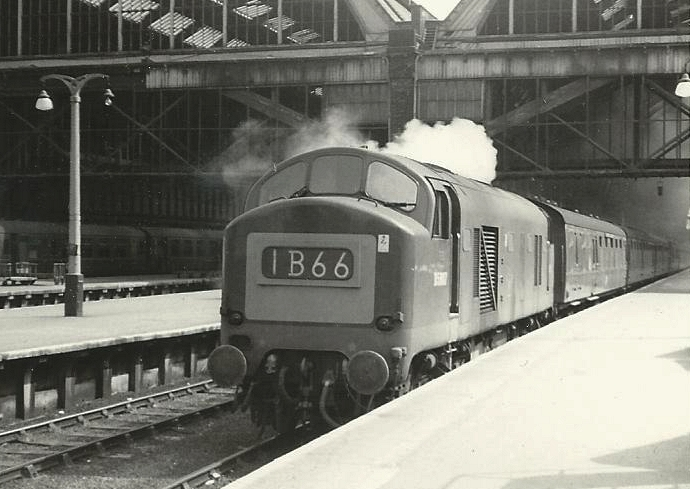
D5907, as modified, at King's Cross in 1966.

It was decided by BR and EE to carry out a programme to refurbish the class and modify the engines with new parts designed by the engine manufacturer. The locos also had modifications to their nose ends, losing the gangway doors and headcode discs in favour of a central roller blind headcode box. The livery also changed to two tone green with grey roof similar to that of the British Rail Class 55s so they looked every bit a 'Baby Deltic'. The locomotives gradually returned to traffic and became very reliable in traffic except for continuing coolant system problems. The allocation of all ten locomotives in October 1967 was Finsbury Park.

== Withdrawal ==
By the late 1960s BR had drawn up a "National Traction Plan", whose aim was to rationalise the number and types of diesel locomotives in traffic (and thus reduce operating costs). The 'Baby Deltics' were an obvious target, being only a ten-strong class, and still beset with operational problems. The locos were withdrawn between 1968 and 1971. The last two locos in traffic on revenue-earning service were D5905 and D5909. Several of the class received full yellow ends whilst still in two-tone green. These were D5900/3/4/8; D5908 also carried the new double-arrow BR symbol. D5909 was the only locomotive to receive the full "rail blue" livery. D5901 was transferred to the departmental fleet of the Railway Technical Centre in 1969. It worked test trains to and from the RTC until 1975, when it was replaced by a Class 24. The loco was cut up in 1977, still carrying two-tone green livery with a grey roof and small yellow warning panel.

Table of withdrawals by year
| Year | Quantity in service at start of year | Quantity withdrawn | Locomotive number | Notes |
|---|---|---|---|---|
| 1968 | 10 | 4 | D5900/3/6-7 | |
| 1969 | 6 | 4 | D5901-2/4/8 | D5901 went into departmental use |
| 1970 | 2 | 0 | – | |
| 1971 | 2 | 2 | D5905/9 | |

== Preservation ==
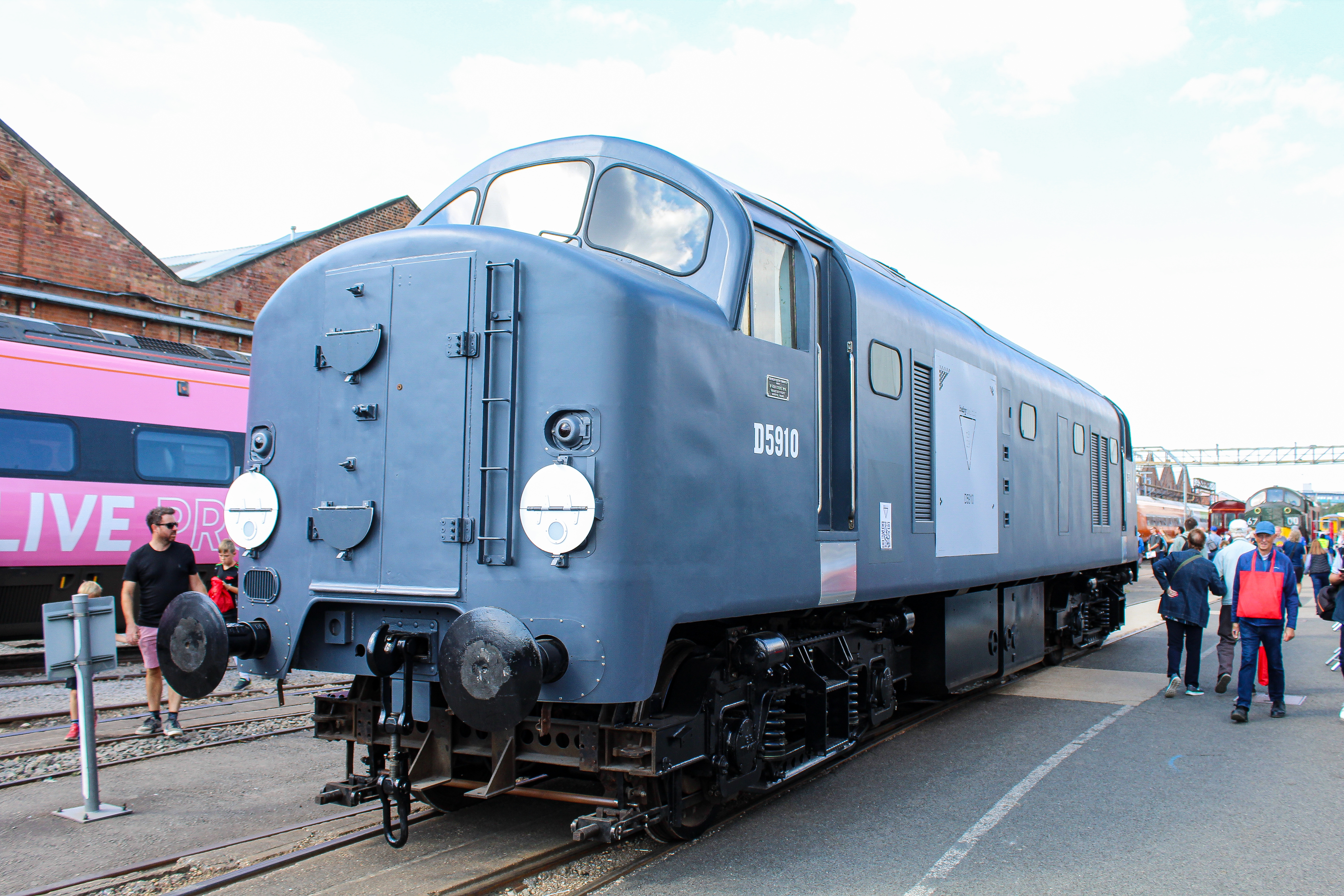
At Derby Litchurch Lane Works, 2025

The only major component of a Baby Deltic to survive (apart from works plates) is Napier T9-29 engine No. 388 along with its main and auxiliary generators. It had been stored at Stratford TMD being retained as a spare for D5901 whilst it continued in service at the RTC. After D5901 was finally withdrawn the decision was taken to transfer the engine to the National Railway Museum in York. In 2001 the engine was purchased by the Baby Deltic Project and restored to operational condition in 2008. The Baby Deltic Project purchased Class 37 No. 37372, into which the engine was temporarily fitted whilst undergoing running tests. The T9-29 engine is currently in store at Barrow Hill Roundhouse near Chesterfield (and not on public display) whilst the Baby Deltic Project completes modification work to the locomotive.

On 5 September 2010, the Baby Deltic Project announced its plans to create a new member of the class. This is being achieved by way of shortening 37372's body in three places and mounting it on Class 20 bogies. The locomotive can be viewed in the Barrow Hill Roundhouse near Chesterfield where it is currently undergoing the transformation from 37372 into D5910.

A book about the restoration of the sole-remaining 'Baby' Deltic engine has been published by The Baby Deltic Project and is available through their website.

== Models ==
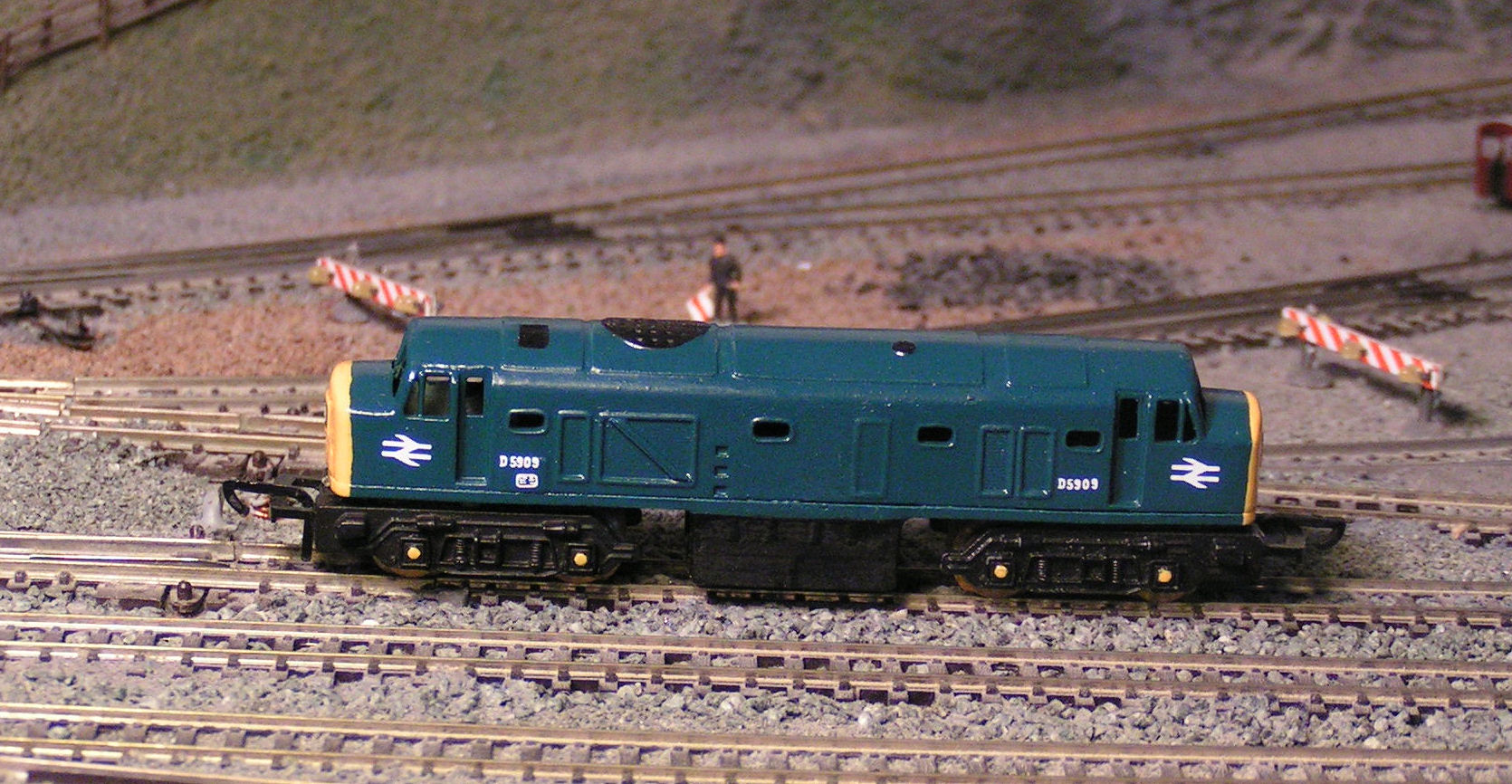
Lone Star Class 23 model in OOO gauge with die-cast housing.

The Class 23 "Baby Deltic" is being made as a kit and ready-to-run in OO gauge by Silver Fox Models.

Between 1960 and 1965 the Class 23 was available in OOO gauge (2 mm scale) as part of the Lone Star "Treble-O-Lectric" range of Die Cast Machine Tools models in both powered and unpowered versions.

In 2012, Heljan introduced ready to run OO gauge models of the Class 23, both in original and rebuilt forms.
