= Widened Lines =

Central London railway line

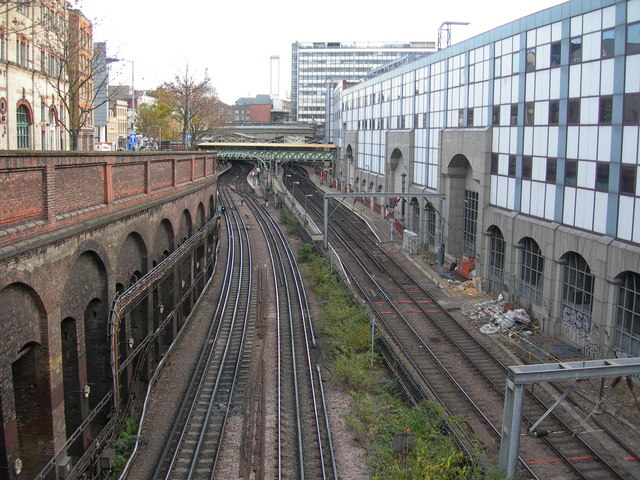
Southeast view towards Farringdon station: the London Underground's Metropolitan, Circle and Hammersmith & City lines are at left, Thameslink's Widened Lines at right

The Widened Lines (also known as the City Widened Lines; formerly known as the Moorgate line) is a double-track railway line forming part of the Thameslink route between St Pancras and Farringdon within Central London.

For most of their life the Widened Lines ran from King's Cross to Moorgate, and were completed in 1866 when the Metropolitan Railway was widened from two to four tracks between King's Cross and Farringdon (hence the widened name) and a four-track railway opened from there to Moorgate.

The tracks were owned by the Metropolitan Railway but were used mainly by other railway companies. Connections to the Great Northern Railway (GNR) at King's Cross and London, Chatham and Dover Railway (LC&DR) at Farringdon allowed cross-London services to run. There was very soon a connection to the Midland Railway at St Pancras, near King's Cross. In the early 20th century competition led to the cross-London services being withdrawn, although the GNR and Midland services into Moorgate survived. The former GNR services were diverted via the Northern City Line to Moorgate in 1976, and in 1988 the cross-London route reopened for Thameslink. The line east of Farringdon closed in 2009 to allow the platforms at Farringdon to be extended to take 12-car trains.

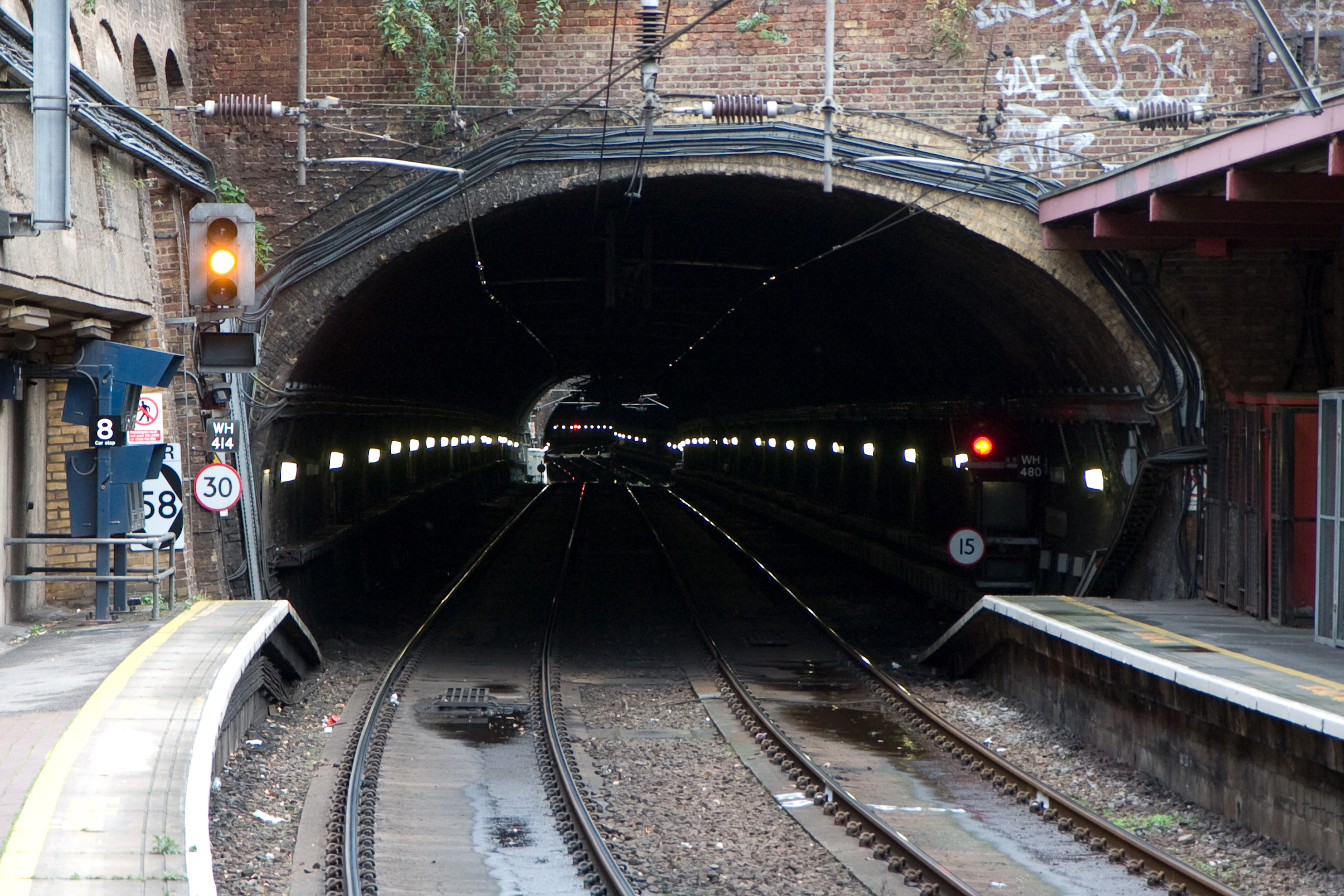
Looking southwards through Clerkenwell No3 tunnel towards Farringdon from King's Cross Thameslink station

== Construction ==
The City Widened Lines between King's Cross and Moorgate Street and their connections

In 1863, the Metropolitan Railway (also known as the Met) opened the world's first underground railway. From Paddington the line was built using the "cut-and-cover" method beneath the New Road, connecting the main-line railway termini at Paddington, Euston and King's Cross, then followed Farringdon Road in tunnel and cutting to a station at Farringdon Street near Smithfield, near the capital's financial heart in the City. The service was initially provided by gas-lit wooden carriages hauled by steam locomotives.

With connections to the Great Western Railway (GWR) and GNR under construction and connections to the Midland Railway and the LC&DR planned, the Met obtained permission in 1861 and 1864 (Note: In the Metropolitan Railway Act 1861 and the Metropolitan Railway (Finsbury Circus Extension) Act 1861 and Metropolitan Railway Act was given Royal Assent on 25 July 1864 approving the additional tracks to King's Cross.) for a four-track eastward extension to a new terminus at Moorgate and two additional tracks from King's Cross to Farringdon Street. The Met used two tracks for its own services, while the other two tracks were used mainly by other railway companies; these collectively became known as the City Widened Lines. A pair of single track tunnels at King's Cross connecting the GNR to the Met came into passenger use on 1 October 1863 when the GNR began running trains, (Note: One of these tunnels, completed in 1862, was used to bring GNR-loaned rolling stock to the Metropolitan Railway when the GWR withdrew its trains in August 1863.) those towards Farringdon Street calling at a single-platform station at King's Cross York Road, in the reverse direction at King's Cross Suburban station. A west curve towards Baker Street was built but not used for regular traffic, and the track was removed in 1865. Having withdrawn from running Metropolitan services on 10 August, the GWR returned on 1 October 1863 with through trains from such places as Windsor.

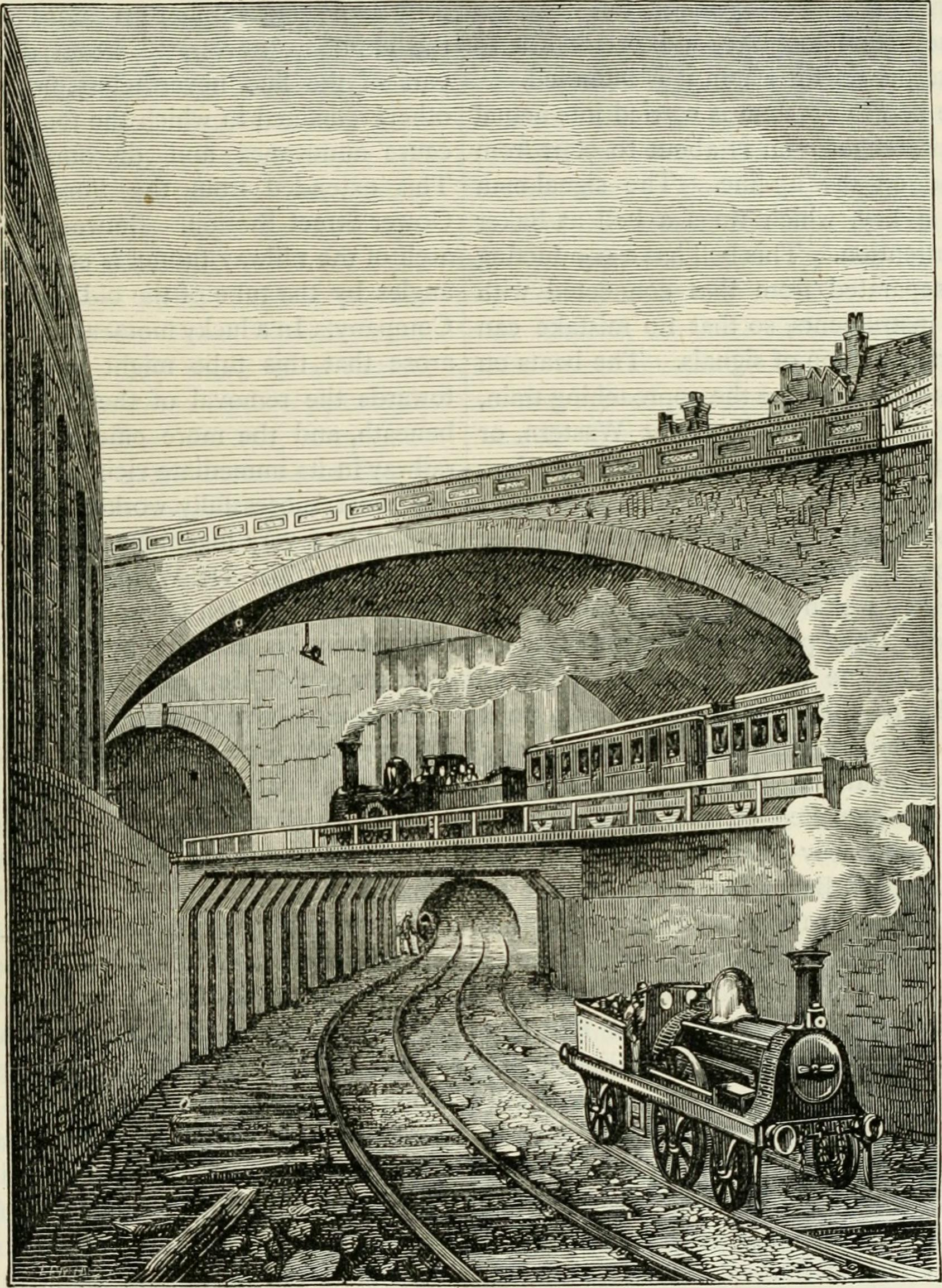
1873 view

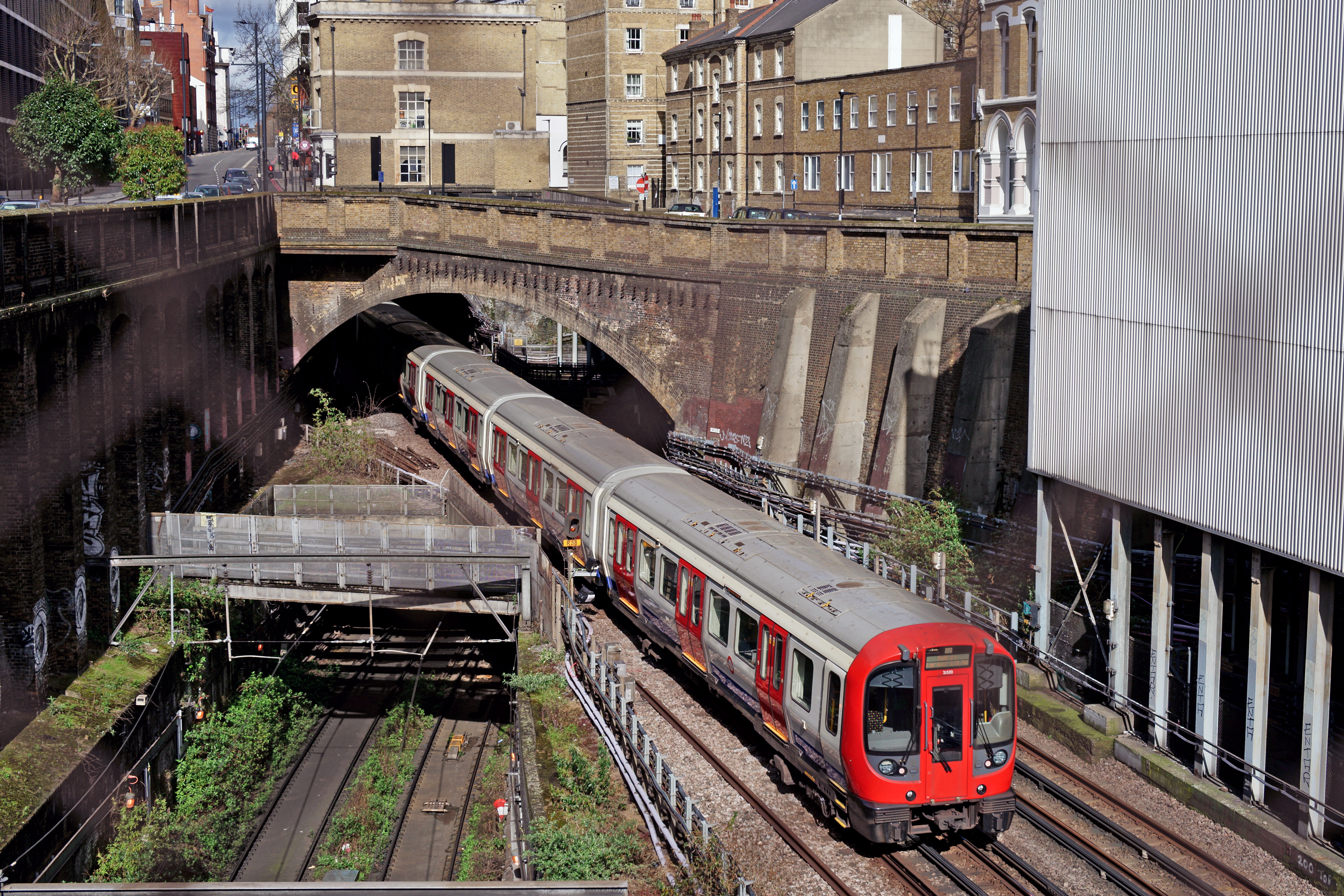
2019 view

The Ray Street Gridiron carries the London Underground tracks over the Widened Lines.
The upper tracks were the original Metropolitan Railway, and are now used by the Metropolitan, Circle and Hammersmith & City lines.
The lower tracks are the Widened lines, and now carry Thameslink traffic.
The tunnels ahead are the Clerkenwell tunnels. Farringdon station is behind the photographer.

The extension to Aldersgate Street and Moorgate Street (now Barbican and Moorgate) opened on 23 December 1865, and all four lines were open on 1 March 1866. The parallel tracks from King's Cross to Farringdon, first used by a GNR freight train on 27 January 1868, entered a second Clerkenwell tunnel before dropping at a gradient of 1 in 100, passing under the Ray Street Gridiron carrying the original Met track before ascending a 1 in 40 slope to Farringdon. A plan was developed to extend the City Widened Lines to Euston, but this was never completed.

== Passenger services ==
On 1 January 1866, LC&DR and GNR joint services from Blackfriars Bridge began operating on to the Met via the Snow Hill tunnel under Smithfield market to Farringdon and northwards on to the GNR. From 3 January 1866 GNR services ran to Ludgate Hill and LC&DR services ran to Farringdon Street.

The Midland Railway junction opened on 13 July 1868 when services ran into Moorgate Street before St Pancras station opened. The line left the Midland main line at St Paul's Road Junction, entering a double-track tunnel and joining the Widened Lines at Midland Junction. A tunnel was built west of Midland Junction with the intent of quadrupling all the way to Paddington, but was not used until 1926. Initially services ran from the Tottenham & Hampstead Junction line to Moorgate and Victoria. From 1 July 1875 the Midland ran services from Hendon and South Tottenham to Victoria, the LC&DR between Victoria and Hendon.

On 1 September 1871, an eastern curve from the Snow Hill line was opened and the LC&DR diverted its Victoria to Farringdon service to Moorgate. This started at 80 trains per day, declining to 48 by 1913.

The South Eastern Railway (SER) built a connection with the LC&DR at Blackfriars Bridge. From 1 June 1878, the GNR ran six trains a day to Woolwich Arsenal and from 1 August 1880 the SER ran to Enfield and Muswell Hill on behalf of the GNR.

The writer Andrew Martin claims that, by the end of the 19th century, a continental passenger service linked Liverpool with Paris via the Widened Lines. Trains departed at 08:00 and arrived in Paris by 22:50, the passengers having transferred at Folkestone to a steamer across the Channel.

In the early 20th century, competition from the electric underground railways and electric trams meant that the SER and GNR service was withdrawn on 30 April 1907, the GNR and LCDR service in September 1907 and the Midland and LCDR service in June 1908. Passenger services across London through Snow Hill railway station and Snow Hill tunnel were withdrawn in 1916.

From 1 January 1908, electric locomotives were exchanged for steam locomotives on passenger trains at Paddington, and GWR services continued to run until 1939.

The former GNR and Midland services continued to run to Moorgate, DMUs and diesel locomotives replacing steam in the 1960s. In 1976 the former GNR services were diverted at Finsbury Park via the Northern City Line to Moorgate, and York Road station and the curves into King's Cross closed.

In 1978, work started on electrification of the Widened Lines from St Pancras to Moorgate as part of the "Bedpan" line, an electric service between Bedford and Moorgate, opening on 15 July 1983. King's Cross Widened Lines station was renamed King's Cross Midland City, and King's Cross Thameslink in May 1988 when the Snow Hill tunnels reopened for Thameslink.

The line from Farringdon to Moorgate closed on 20 March 2009, to allow the platforms at Farringdon to be extended to take 12-car trains.

== LC&DR stations ==
When the line opened south of Farringdon, the LC&DR had a station at Ludgate Hill that had opened on 1 June 1865 and Blackfriars Bridge on the south side of the Thames. On 2 March 1874 Holborn Viaduct opened as a six-platform south-facing terminus. Close by, Snow Hill opened on the through line on 1 August, renamed Holborn Viaduct Low Level in 1912. In 1886 Blackfriars railway station opened, as St Paul's, on the north side of the river replacing Blackfriars Bridge, which closed the same year, renamed Blackfriars in 1937. When through traffic was withdrawn in 1916, Holborn Viaduct Low Level closed. Ludgate Hill closed in 1929.

After Thameslink services started, in 1990 Holborn Viaduct was replaced by new platforms on the through line, named St Paul's Thameslink (in 1991 renamed City Thameslink).

== Goods and coal services ==
Railway goods traffic developed in the 1860s and 1870s, by which time almost every station had an associated goods yard. It then became possible to send goods from any station (or siding) in Britain to any other station. In particular, any station in the South of England could receive goods from places in northern parts. Places in the South were also able to order coal from collieries in Nottinghamshire, Derbyshire and Yorkshire, as well as other coalfields, to be conveyed to destination by rail. Such traffic had to cross London from North to South. There was also a certain amount of traffic in the opposite direction, as well as returned empty coal wagons.

The MR and GNR already having connections with the Widened Lines, it became convenient to use the route to transfer wagons of goods and coal to the Southern companies. By comparison, the LNWR and GWR used the route via the West London Railway, and the GER used the East London Railway. The method adopted was to run trains from the north to a place on the outskirts of London where there were sidings where the train could be broken up. The wagons destined for places south of the Thames were separated and made into a separate train to run across London to another group of sidings where they could be resorted according to final destination. Originally small groups of sidings were used, such as Kentish Town and West Hampstead on the MR, Holloway and Finsbury Park on the GNR. In the later part of the nineteenth century the amount of traffic outstripped the capacity of such places, and huge new marshalling yards were constructed at Brent Sidings MR and Ferme Park GNR.

The companies south of the Thames received the cross-London traffic at places such as Battersea Wharf and Norwood Junction on the LB&SCR, Herne Hill on the LCDR and Bricklayers Arms on the SER. Traffic from GNR to LSWR used the Widened Lines to Clapham Junction or Brentford, or the North London and North and South Western Junction Railways, according to destination, but for traffic from MR to LSWR the route via Acton Wells Junction and the North and South Western Junction Railway was more convenient, especially after the marshalling was done at Brent Sidings. The extensive marshalling yard at Hither Green SER was opened in 1899, while a new yard opened at Feltham on the LSWR in 1917-21 largely replaced that company's existing yards.

The overall picture was further complicated by the establishment of coal depots in South London by the "northern" companies, mainly the MR and GNR, which enabled them to take control of the whole transit of the coal from colliery to local distributor. These depots were served by dedicated workings from the yards on the MR and GNR - latterly Brent Sidings and Ferme Park – via the Widened Lines and running powers established at various dates. Further details can be found in an article by Edwin Course in Railway Magazine.

In 1877, there were 58 daily trips from the MR over the Widened Lines their own South London depots and to the LB&SCR, LCDR and SER destinations mentioned above. There must have been a similar number of workings from the GNR, details of which can be found in the working timetables at the National Archives.

Train loads were restricted through the tunnel section, and there was little scope for running longer and fewer trains. More paths were available for goods trains after the cessation of passenger services in 1916. Freight traffic continued and was of considerable importance in both World Wars. With the decline of wagonload freight traffic from the 1960s and the National Freight Train Plan of 1968, more use was made of the West London Line, allowing the Widened Lines to be abandoned for such traffic.

== Goods depots ==
Goods depots opened near Farringdon on the Widened Lines. Smithfield Market Sidings opened 1 May 1869, serviced by the GWR. The GNR opened its depot on 2 November 1874, the Midland followed with its Whitecross depot on 1 January 1878. Finally the Met opened its depot at Vine Street in 1909, serviced by electric locomotives from West Hampstead The GNR goods depot closed on 15 January 1956 and Smithfield Market was last served by train on 28 July 1962.

== The First World War ==
Following Great Britain's declaration of war on Germany on 4 August 1914 until the end of the World War I, the Widened Lines assumed a role of great strategic importance for through railway communications, the more so as the bulk of the naval and military traffic was required to travel between North and South. The route formed a vital link between the English Channel ports and the railways to the north of London for the movement of troops and freight. The number of troop trains dealt with from the outbreak of war to 25 February 1915 was no fewer than 2,738, the chairman of the Met told a company meeting on the latter date, while during the first fortnight of 1915 the number of goods trains taken over the Widened Lines was 2,935 - an average of 210 a day, not including special military trains for troops and stores and the ordinary local passenger services. Overall, from 5 August 1914 to 31 December 1918, 248,072 long tons (252,100 t) of goods and 26,047 through military specials for personnel or material were run over the Widened Lines between the northern and southern railways. This was despite major physical constraints that affected the use of the route and imposed restrictions on the nature and extent of the traffic that could pass over it. The most important were the severe gradients, particularly where the lines crossed each other between King's Cross and Farringdon, and loading gauge restrictions, which prevented ambulance trains and wagons conveying goods of exceptional width and height from using the route.

== Locomotives ==
=== 19th century ===
Almost from the date of opening of the Widened Lines, the various railway companies supplied their own steam locomotives (mostly fitted with condensing apparatus). These included:

Great Northern Railway

Two 0-8-0T locomotives from the Avonside Engine Company, delivered in 1866 and numbered 472 and 473. These were designed for hauling coal trains to Farringdon Street and to South London via Snow Hill. Six locomotives were ordered but the last four were cancelled because the first two proved ill-suited to the route because of their long rigid wheelbase. For passenger services, "120 class" 0-4-4T locomotives 621-628 (built 1872) were used. These had inconspicuous condensing apparatus with the pipework hidden from view.

Great Western Railway

For freight working, the GWR used 633 Class 0-6-0T locomotives 643 and 644 built at Wolverhampton railway works in 1871–1872. Four other members of the same class, 633, 634, 641 and 642, were used later.

London Chatham and Dover Railway

Four 2-4-0T locomotives, built by the railway in 1872-1873 using boilers from 4-4-0s that had been acquired in 1860–1861, were used. These rebuilds kept the names of the donor locomotives: Aeolus, Bacchus, Vulcan and Comus. Later, LCDR R class 0-4-4T locomotives were used.

London and North Western Railway

Sixteen Beyer, Peacock and Company 4-4-0T locomotives, delivered 1871-1872 and numbered 2055–2070. These were to the same design as the Metropolitan Railway A Class but had weatherboards at the rear as well as the front.

Midland Railway

Six Beyer, Peacock & Company 4-4-0T locomotives delivered in 1868 and numbered 204–209. These were to the same design as the Metropolitan Railway A Class.

=== 20th century ===
During the 20th century, steam locomotives used on the Widened Lines included:

- GNR Class L1 0-8-2T
- GNR Class N2 0-6-2T
- GWR 9700 Class 0-6-0PT
- LMS Fowler 2-6-2T

In the diesel locomotive era, Class 23, Class 26 and Class 31 locomotives were used on passenger trains between King's Cross and Moorgate.

== Notes and references ==
=== Bibliography ===
- Day, John R.; Reed, John (2008) [1963]. The Story of London's Underground (10th ed.). Capital Transport. ISBN 978-1-85414-316-7.
- "Fowler's Ghost" (May 1962). Cooke, B.W.C. (ed.). "Railway connections at King's Cross (part one)". The Railway Magazine. Vol. 108, no. 733. Tothill Press.
- Green, Oliver (1987). The London Underground: An illustrated history. Ian Allan. ISBN 0-7110-1720-4.
- Horne, Mike (2003). The Metropolitan Line. Capital Transport. ISBN 1-85414-275-5.
- Jackson, Alan (1986). London's Metropolitan Railway. David & Charles. ISBN 0-7153-8839-8.
- Pratt, Edwin A. (1921). British Railways and the Great War. Selwyn & Blount.
