= Thomas Myres =

English architect of railway buildings

Thomas Harrison Myres FRIBA
- Born: 1842; Preston, Lancashire, England
- Died: 3 December 1926 (aged 83–84); Preston, Lancashire, England
- Occupation: Architect
- Employer: London, Brighton and South Coast Railway
- Known for: Architect, LB&SCR (1880s)
- Notable work: Stations on Bluebell Railway
- Spouse: Katharine Mary Banister (1871–1923) Her death
- Children: Eleanor Annie (born 1873); Frederick Edmund (born 1875); Katharine Dorothea (born 1880)
- Parent(s): John James Myres; Margaret Harrison

Thomas Harrison Myres FRIBA (1842 – 3 December 1926) was an English railway architect who designed stations and ancillary buildings for the London, Brighton & South Coast Railway lines that were opened between 1880 and 1883, including several on what is now the Bluebell Railway. He was the son-in-law of the railway company's chief engineer, Frederick Banister. Although most of the lines for which Myres designed the buildings have been closed, many of his buildings survive as private residences. Several of the buildings designed by him are listed buildings, including the goods shed at Singleton in West Sussex which was declared Grade II in April 2013.

== Personal and early life ==
Myres was born in Preston, Lancashire, the third son of John James Myres (1811–1881) and Margaret Harrison (1812–1875). His brothers included William Miles Myres (1838–1901), who became Vicar of St Swithun's Church at Swanbourne in Buckinghamshire and was the father of John Linton Myres (1869–1954), the archaeologist who was the first Wykeham Professor of Ancient History at the University of Oxford. Myres was baptised at St John's Church, Preston on 5 August 1842.

John James Myres was one of the founders of the civil engineering and architectural practice of Myres and Newton, based in Preston, who was appointed Mayor of Preston in 1868 and again in 1873. Between about 1838 and 1844, Frederick Banister was articled to the practice before becoming a railway engineer on the Lancashire & Yorkshire Railway. Banister subsequently moved to southern England where in 1860 he became chief engineer to the London, Brighton & South Coast Railway (LB&SCR).

Following his appointment as chief engineer to LB&SCR, Banister agreed to take Thomas Harrison Myres as a trainee, with Myres moving to the south to lodge with Banister. In 1871, Myres married Banister's daughter, Katharine Mary Banister (born 1848), then living in Deptford. The couple had three children: Eleanor Annie (born 1873), Frederick Edmund (born 1875) and Katharine Dorothea (born 1880). Frederick became an architect and a member of the family firm. Thomas's wife Katharine died at Preston on 1 August 1923.

== Professional and later life ==
Between 1880 and 1890, Myres was responsible for the design of new stations and other railway buildings built for the LB&SCR, although some of the stations were designed by staff architects working to Myres's basic concept.

By the early 1890s, Myres had returned to Preston becoming a partner in the family firm trading as "Messrs. Veevers and Myres". In January 1893, Richard Veevers left the partnership, from when the partners were John James Myres and Thomas Harrison Myres, trading from Preston, Blackpool and at London Bridge. By January 1905, the partnership included Henry Heaton and Miles Myres.

At the time of the 1911 Census, Myres and his wife had various residences, including at Cottam, Lancashire. After Myres's death in 1926, a monument to him and his wife was erected at nearby Lea (at 53°46′51″N 2°46′17″W) bearing the inscription: "To the glory of God and in the memory of the pioneer of restoration of roadside crosses Thomas Harrison Myres of Lea Lodge and of Catherine Mary his wife. The base of this cross originally stood 20 yds. west of this spot and was removed here and dedicated July 8th 1929".

A bundle of Myres's papers is held in the National Archives, including correspondence, accounts etc.

== Stations designed by Myres ==
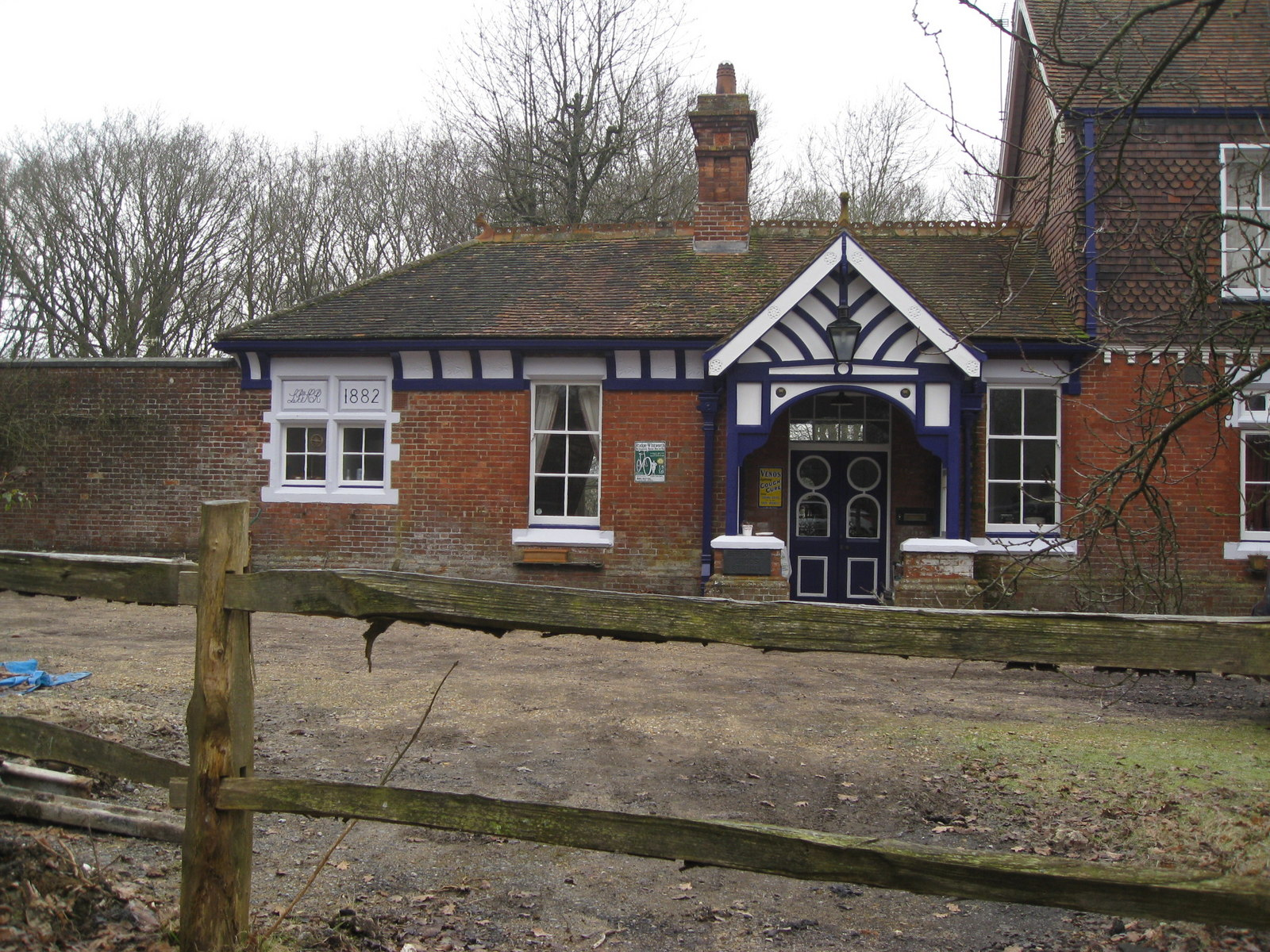
The former Barcombe station showing company monogram alongside the date of the building

In total, Myres designed 18 stations for the London, Brighton & South Coast Railway in the 1880s, including those on the new lines from Hailsham to Eridge (opened 1880), Chichester to Midhurst (opened 1881), Lewes to East Grinstead (opened 1882) and Haywards Heath to Horsted Keynes (opened 1883).

The stations designed by Myres have been described as "distinctive and unnecessarily large", and as "amongst the most ornate provided by the Brighton company" which "blended well with their rustic surroundings". They were built in an "Old English" style, based on a standard design and were built of red brick with steep tiled roof and gables with elaborate bargeboards. The standard details included oriel windows, pargetting with flower designs and mock-Tudor timber on the first floors, elaborate carved porches at the entrance to the booking hall, with stained glass panels. Over the years, the mock timber was generally covered with hung tiles to prevent damp penetrating.

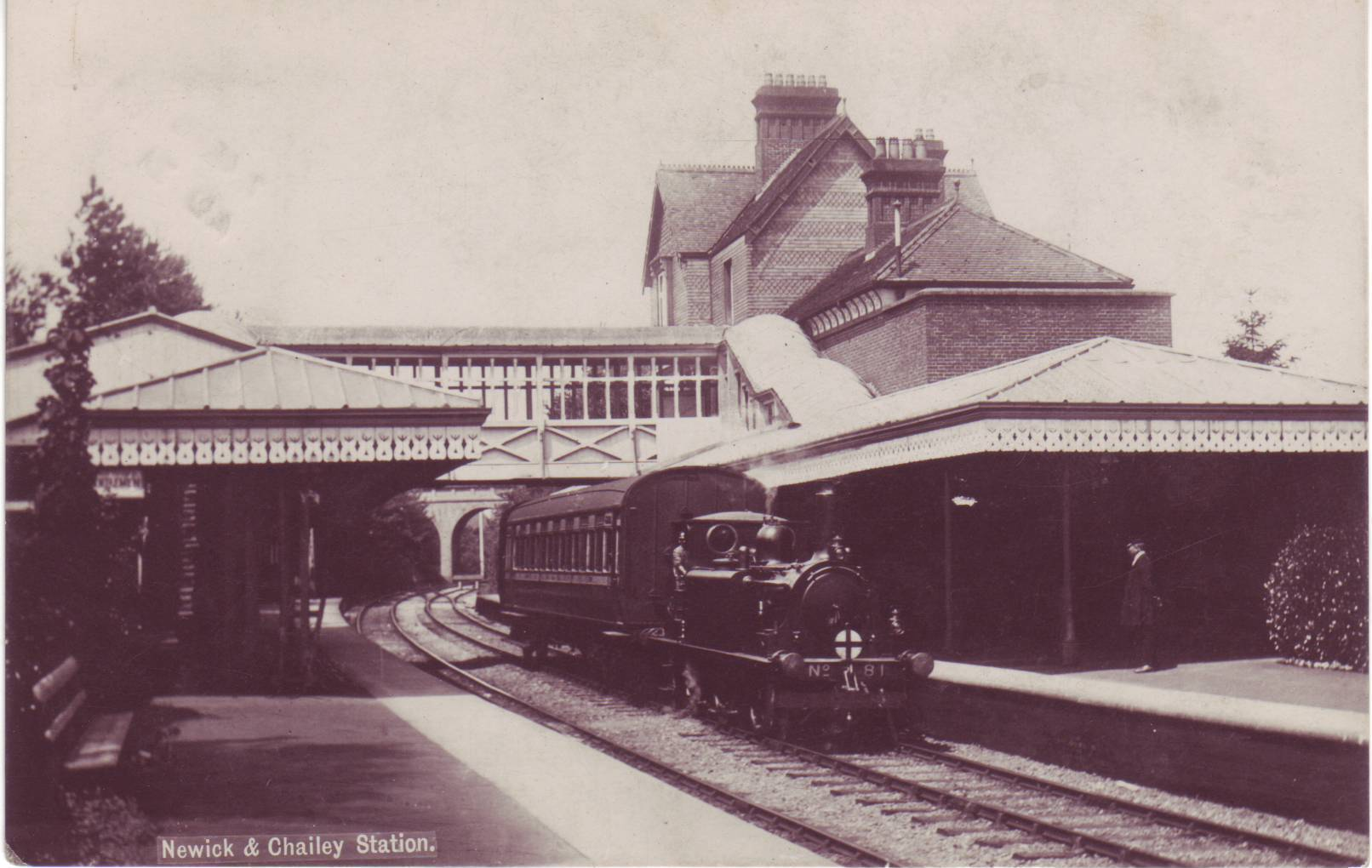
Newick and Chailey station showing the canopy and enclosed footbridge

The stations featured "commodious" platform canopies, clad in zinc and supported by columns, made from either cast iron or timber, some with "particularly elegant" ironwork. Where possible, the standard Myres layout comprised a large L-shaped two-storey stationmaster's house, connected to a single-storey booking office, waiting rooms, lavatories etc., although the design needed to be adapted for stations on unlevel ground where the platform was either above or below road level, or on split levels.

Many of the stations were decorated with a company monogram alongside the date of the building: examples include those at Lavant, Singleton and Sheffield Park. The restored former Barcombe station shows a particularly fine example. Several of the larger stations featured a distinctive footbridge design, constructed of wood, with a roof, although no examples now survive.

In 1887, Frederick McDermott praised Myres's work in his "Life of Joseph Firbank" (Firbank was the contractor who built the Lewes to East Grinstead line, among others):

Leaving the cold classical style adopted by the first railway engineers and since generally followed, Mr Myres chose the warm colouring and varied form of what has, of late years, been termed the Queen Anne School, and the effects of the bright red brick, wooden beams and casemented windows is very pleasing.

The description "Queen Anne School" is incorrect, however, as Myres's buildings were not symmetrical, nor could they be considered "classical".

=== Hassocks ===
The first station designed by Myres was for the 1880 rebuilding of Hassocks on the Brighton Main Line. The station was built to replace the original 1841 station designed by David Mocatta; the new station was typical "Myres" with a half-timbered upper storey, decorative eaves, stained glass windows and elaborate porches, although not built to the "standard" Myres layout, having separate entrances to both the up and the down platforms. The main buildings were on the up side, including a refreshment room, with a single-storey building on the down platform with a separate booking office and waiting room. The main booking office had a lantern roof, as did the lavatories on the down platform, and the spacious platforms were protected by wide graceful canopies, supported on a double row of decorative cast iron columns. The station was built by James Longley of Turners Hill at a cost of £8,416.

This station was demolished in 1973 and replaced with a "truly awful" modern structure. In 2006, members of the local community attempted to have the station rebuilt to a design similar to the Myres design; in the event, this design was not accepted and in July 2013, a new station was opened with a more modern "state of the art" building.

=== Hailsham to Eridge (Cuckoo Line) ===
The line from Hailsham to Eridge was opened in 1880, with Myres being responsible for the design of all five intermediate stations, which were built by James Longley & Co. of Crawley. The stations at Hellingly and Horam were both of the standard Myres design, while that at Heathfield had the platforms in a cutting with the booking office and stationmaster's house at road level, at right angles to the tracks. Mayfield and Rotherfield & Mark Cross were also built to the standard design, with the addition of a refreshment room in the "business" end. According to the company minutes, Mayfield station was built by James Longley at a cost of £3,190.

The line, which acquired the name "The Cuckoo Line", was closed in 1965 although much of the track bed is now used for the Cuckoo Trail long-distance footpath.

Horam station has now been demolished and the site is now lost under a housing estate, although parts of the platform remain. Hellingly station is now a private residence, and is well preserved, including the platform canopies. At Heathfield, the booking office is occupied by a restaurant offering Greek cuisine, while the stationmasters's house is a private residence. The platforms and platform buildings have been demolished. The former Mayfield station is also a private residence, situated on a high bank adjacent to the Mayfield bypass (A267). At Rotherfield, the station buildings have been split into two residences with the platform canopy on the main building being retained and a swimming pool between the platforms.

Following the opening of the line to Hailsham, Eridge station was rebuilt in 1880 to convert it into a junction station. Although not designed by Myres, the station does contain two Myres' features – the booking office doors and the stone mullion windows on the north side.

=== Chichester to Midhurst ===
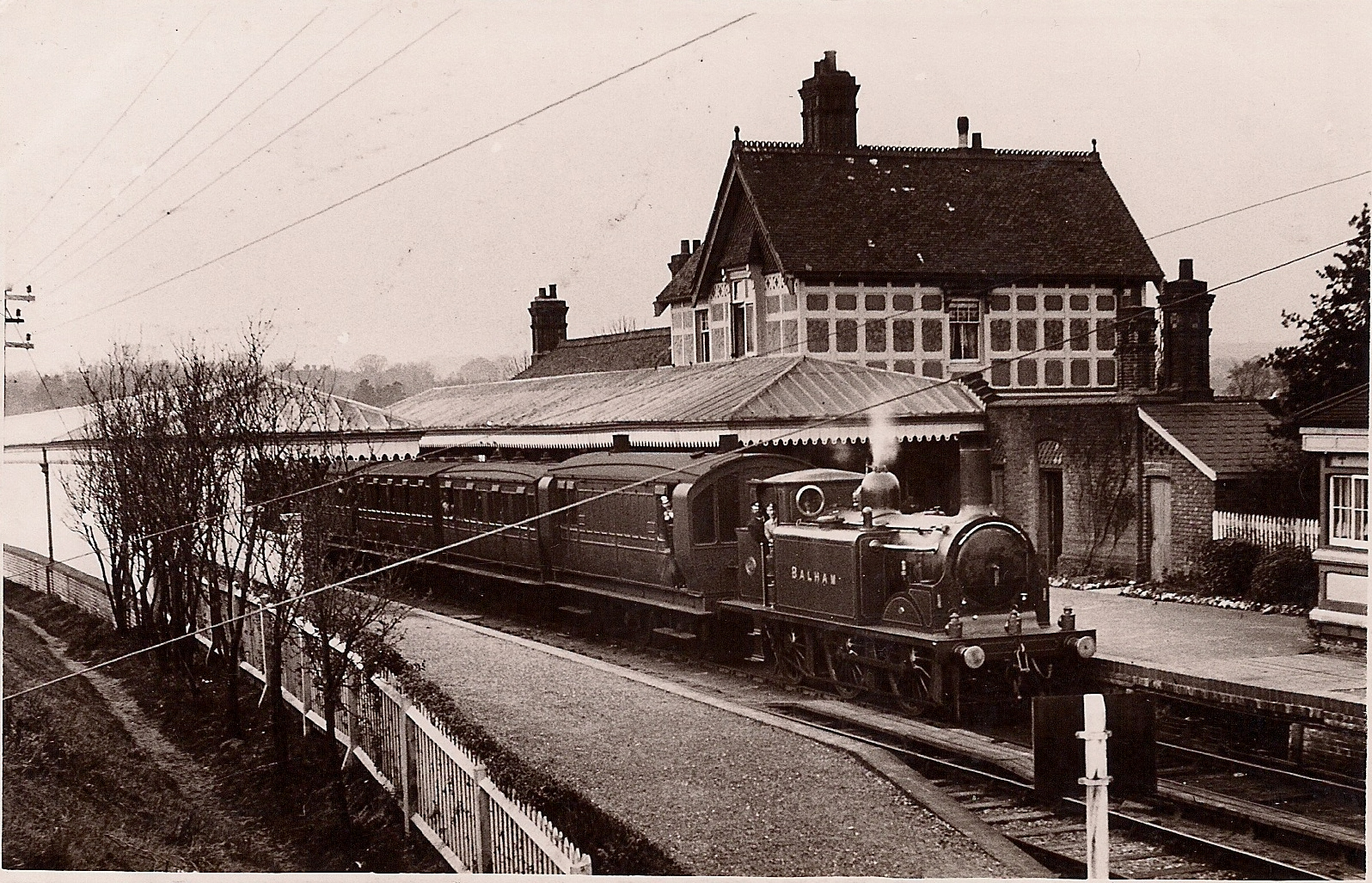
Midhurst (LBSCR) railway station (postcard)

The year after the Hailsham line was opened, the LB&SCR opened the line between Chichester and Midhurst with three intermediate stations; these and the new station at Midhurst were all designed by Myres.

Lavant was built in a cutting and, as a result, the platform buildings were in effect a basement to the main buildings at road level and thus the station appeared to be on three storeys from the trackside. The two levels were connected by a wooden staircase under the canopy, with a separate luggage chute on the southern side.

Singleton has been described as "the most lavish station on the line" and as "most unnecessarily extravagant", being built with four platforms, arranged as two islands, as well as two signal boxes, a goods shed and a turntable. The railway company anticipated substantial business from Goodwood Racecourse and provided facilities to cater for horseboxes as well as additional trains bringing racegoers. The station building was situated at the end of a tree-lined avenue from the village of West Dean. The tracks were at a higher level than the station buildings which were surrounded on three sides by high retaining walls, with access to the island platforms by subway. To the left of the main building, there was a large toilet block in addition to those on the platforms, built solely for the benefit of the racegoers.

Cocking was built on the level to a "standard" Myres design with a particularly elegant porch with flower motifs in the rendering and panels.

On opening of the branch, a new station was built at Midhurst to replace that built in 1866 as the terminus of the line from Pulborough, with the station buildings on the northern, up, platform. The station also included a refreshment building.

The line was closed to passenger traffic in 1935 although freight services continued until 1951 on the northern section and to Lavant until 1970. Following closure, Lavant station was sold and converted into flats, although the canopy was dismantled and sold to the Bluebell Railway for re-erection at Horsted Keynes.

The former Singleton station was for many years occupied by Chilsdown Vineyards, operated by Ian and Andrew Paget, who started producing wine in 1974. The vineyard ceased trading in 2011 and the property is now owned by West Dean Estate and is occupied as a private residence.

Cocking station is also occupied as a private residence, having lost its canopy and had a first floor extension above the former booking office. Cocking retains the half timbered first floor which has been copied in the later extension.

Midhurst station has been demolished and the site is now occupied by a housing estate.

=== Lewes to East Grinstead (Bluebell Line) ===
The third new line to be opened in Sussex in the early 1880s was that opened in 1882 to connect Lewes, the county town of East Sussex, to East Grinstead from where there were already lines to London. At East Grinstead, this necessitated the building of a new station (to replace the station built in 1866) which would serve the new line as well as the existing Three Bridges to Tunbridge Wells Central Line and the line to Oxted and South Croydon which opened in 1884. The new station was built on two levels by Joseph Firbank to the designs of Myres and was estimated at £17,000. When completed, this station had six platform faces, with four at the high level and two at right angles serving the Lewes and Oxted lines, which met at an end-on junction. The station was the largest designed by Myres with a double sized station house on the lower level, which had an upper timber storey with plaster infill (later covered with hung tiles) with impressed flower patterns. It was a substantial structure with refreshment rooms on both levels, with that on the low level said to house a billiards room for travellers. An 1885 publication about East Grinstead described the station as "very commodious and convenient" and "a pleasing object" with "embankments on the outside planted with shrubs and flowers".

Six stations were built between East Grinstead and Lewes, all of which were constructed by Firbank; other than Newick & Chailey they were all to the standard Myres design, with minor detail differences. Newick & Chailey was built in a cutting under the Haywards Heath to Uckfield road (now the A272).

After a long dispute with rail users, the line between Lewes and East Grinstead was closed by British Railways in 1958. Following closure, East Grinstead station was rebuilt with all the Myres buildings being demolished and replaced by a prefabricated CLASP structure opened in 1972 immediately south of the old building.

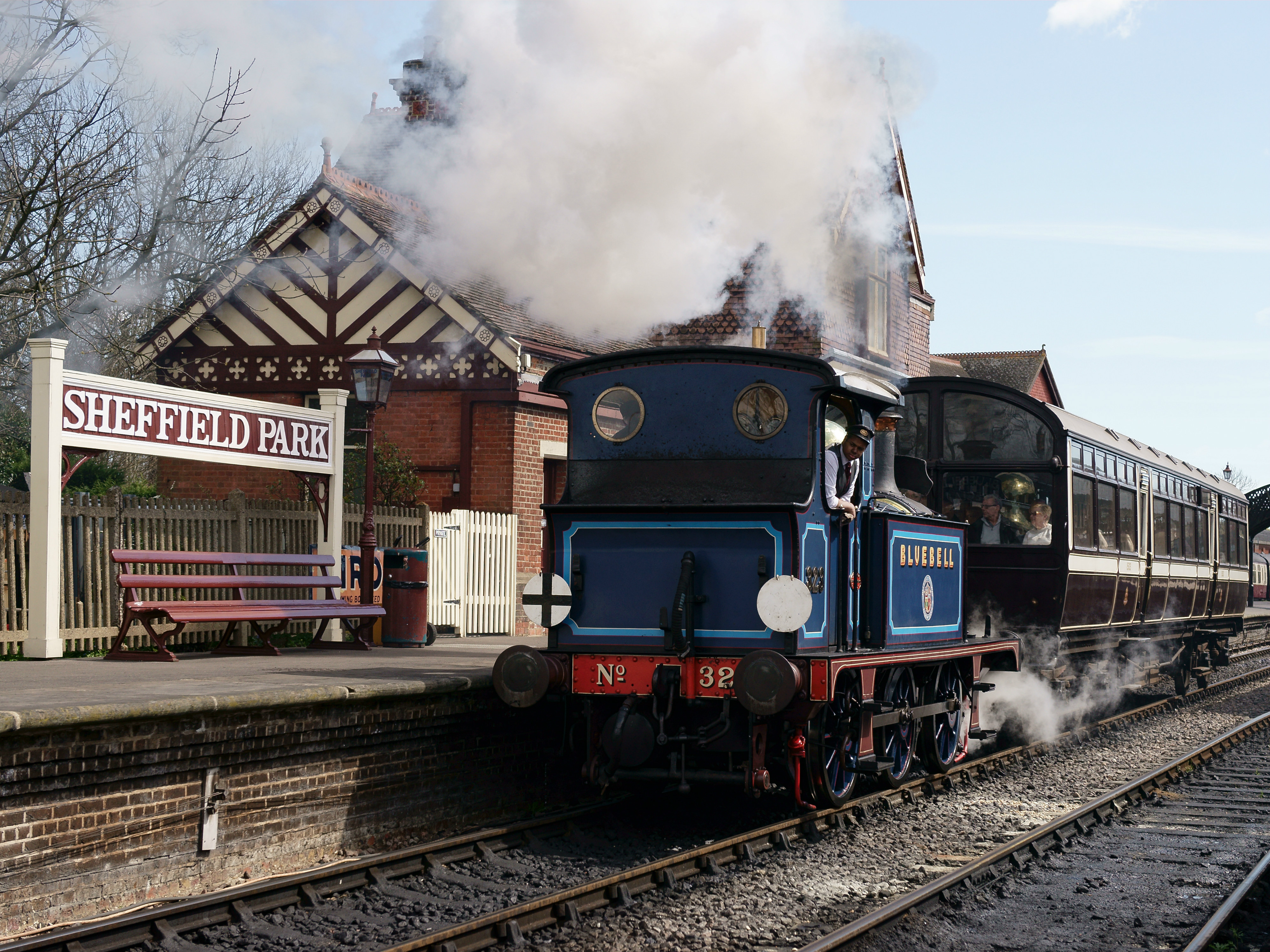
Bluebell Railway No. 323 at Sheffield Park

The line between Sheffield Park and Horsted Keynes was re-opened by the Bluebell Railway Preservation Society in 1962; in March 2013, the society re-opened the line to East Grinstead, with their own separate station south of the mainline station. The line south of Sheffield Park has been abandoned, although the society has long-term plans to re-open this.

Kingscote station was re-opened in 1994 and until March 2013 it was the temporary northern terminus of the heritage line. It has been restored to its 1950s condition by "The Friends of Kingscote", a volunteer group who maintain the station including a replica of the waiting shelter to replace that which had been demolished. The station at West Hoathly was demolished in September 1967 although the site was acquired by the Bluebell Railway in 1974.

Despite the closure of the line from Lewes to East Grinstead in 1958, Horsted Keynes station remained open as the terminus of the line from Haywards Heath. By the time this line had closed in 1963, the Bluebell Railway was operating trains into the station from Sheffield Park. The station has been restored to reflect the 1920s, when it was operated by the Southern Railway and the main station building is a Grade II listed building. The station buildings are standard Myres design with a two-storey stationmaster's house with brick ground floor and tilehung first floor and a single-storey booking hall to the left. The booking hall has a decorated wooden gabled porch with stained glass windows. The canopies on the platforms adjacent to the booking office are original while that on the island platform has been rebuilt from material salvaged from Lavant and Hassocks.

Sheffield Park is the southern terminus of the Bluebell Railway and has been restored to reflect operations shortly after it was opened in the 1880s, although many later buildings have been added including a locomotive shed, museum etc. The Bluebell Railway are gradually restoring the station, with a view to returning the canopies to the original form designed by Myres.

South of Sheffield Park, the line is abandoned and the station at Newick and Chailey has been demolished with the site being incorporated into neighbouring gardens. Barcombe station is now a beautifully restored private residence although the track bed has been infilled.

=== Haywards Heath to Horsted Keynes ===
In 1883, the LB&SCR built a line to connect Horsted Keynes with Haywards Heath with one intermediate station at Ardingly. The stationmaster's house and booking office were built at road level at right angles to the platforms with the line passing under the road in a cutting. The upper storey is decoratively timbered with plaster patterning (flower patterns in black on a white background) and projecting slightly.

Following closure of the line in 1963, the platforms were removed and the site is now occupied by an aggregates depot although the roadside buildings remain and are now a private residence. The Bluebell Railway have medium to long-term plans to re-open the line from Horsted Keynes to Ardingly and on to Haywards Heath.

=== Table ===
Name	Photograph	Line	Date	Location^{[A]}	Present status
Ardingly	Stationmaster's House at former Ardingly Railway Station, West Sussex in 2005	Haywards Heath – Horsted Keynes	1883	TQ338276; 51.0321°N 0.0904°W	Private residence
Barcombe	The former Barcombe Station, West Sussex in 2008	Lewes – East Grinstead (Bluebell Line)	1882	TQ416157; 50.9234°N 0.0155°E	Private residence
Cocking	The former Cocking Railway Station, West Sussex in 1985	Chichester – Midhurst	1881	SU873177; 50.95166°N 0.75639°W	Private residence
East Grinstead	The third East Grinstead railway station, West Sussex in the 1900s	Lewes – East Grinstead (Bluebell Line)	1882	TQ387382; 51.1264°N 0.0178°W	Station operational but Myres buildings demolished
Hassocks	Architect's drawing for the second Hassocks station c.1880	Brighton Main Line	1880	TQ303156; 50.9246°N 0.1460°W	Station operational but Myres buildings demolished
Heathfield	Postcard of Heathfield station from the early 1900s	Hailsham – Eridge (Cuckoo Line)	1880	TQ579213; 50.9697°N 0.2500°E	Private residence
Hellingly	Postcard of Hellingly station from the early 1900s	Hailsham – Eridge (Cuckoo Line)	1880	TQ583121; 50.8860°N 0.2514°E	Private residence
Horam	Postcard of Horam station from the 1930s	Hailsham – Eridge (Cuckoo Line)	1880	TQ578174; 50.9347°N 0.2456°E	Demolished
Horsted Keynes	Horsted Keynes station, West Sussex	Lewes – East Grinstead (Bluebell Line)	1882	TQ370293; 51.0461°N 0.0446°W	Operational
Kingscote	Kingscote station, West Sussex	Lewes – East Grinstead (Bluebell Line)	1882	TQ366356; 51.1031°N 0.0486°W	Operational
Lavant	The former Lavant Railway Station, West Sussex in 1988	Chichester – Midhurst	1881	SU855086; 50.8707°N 0.7848°W	Private residence
Mayfield	The former Mayfield Railway Station, East Sussex in 1986	Hailsham – Eridge (Cuckoo Line)	1880	TQ577268; 51.0185°N 0.2493°E	Private residence
Midhurst	The former Midhurst Railway Station, West Sussex in 1906, showing the Royal train	Chichester – Midhurst	1881	SU883207; 50.9793°N 0.7425°W	Demolished
Newick and Chailey	The former Newick and Chailey Railway Station, West Sussex in 1882	Lewes – East Grinstead (Bluebell Line)	1882	TQ400210; 50.9720°N 0.0063°W	Demolished
Rotherfield and Mark Cross	Former Rotherfield Station	Hailsham – Eridge (Cuckoo Line)	1880	TQ565303; 51.0507°N 0.2326°E	Private residence
Sheffield Park	Sheffield Park Railway Station	Lewes – East Grinstead (Bluebell Line)	1882	TQ403236; 50.9956°N 0.0011°W	Operational
Singleton	The former Singleton Railway Station, West Sussex in 2006	Chichester – Midhurst	1881	SU866130; 50.9102°N 0.7683°W	Private residence
West Hoathly	West Hoathly railway station circa 1905	Lewes – East Grinstead (Bluebell Line)	1882	TQ371328; 51.0786°N 0.0435°W	Demolished

==== Notes ====
- ^{A} Location is given first as a grid reference, based on the British national grid reference system (or OSGB36) of the Ordnance Survey; and second as World Geodetic System 84 coordinates, used by the Global Positioning System.

== Other buildings ==
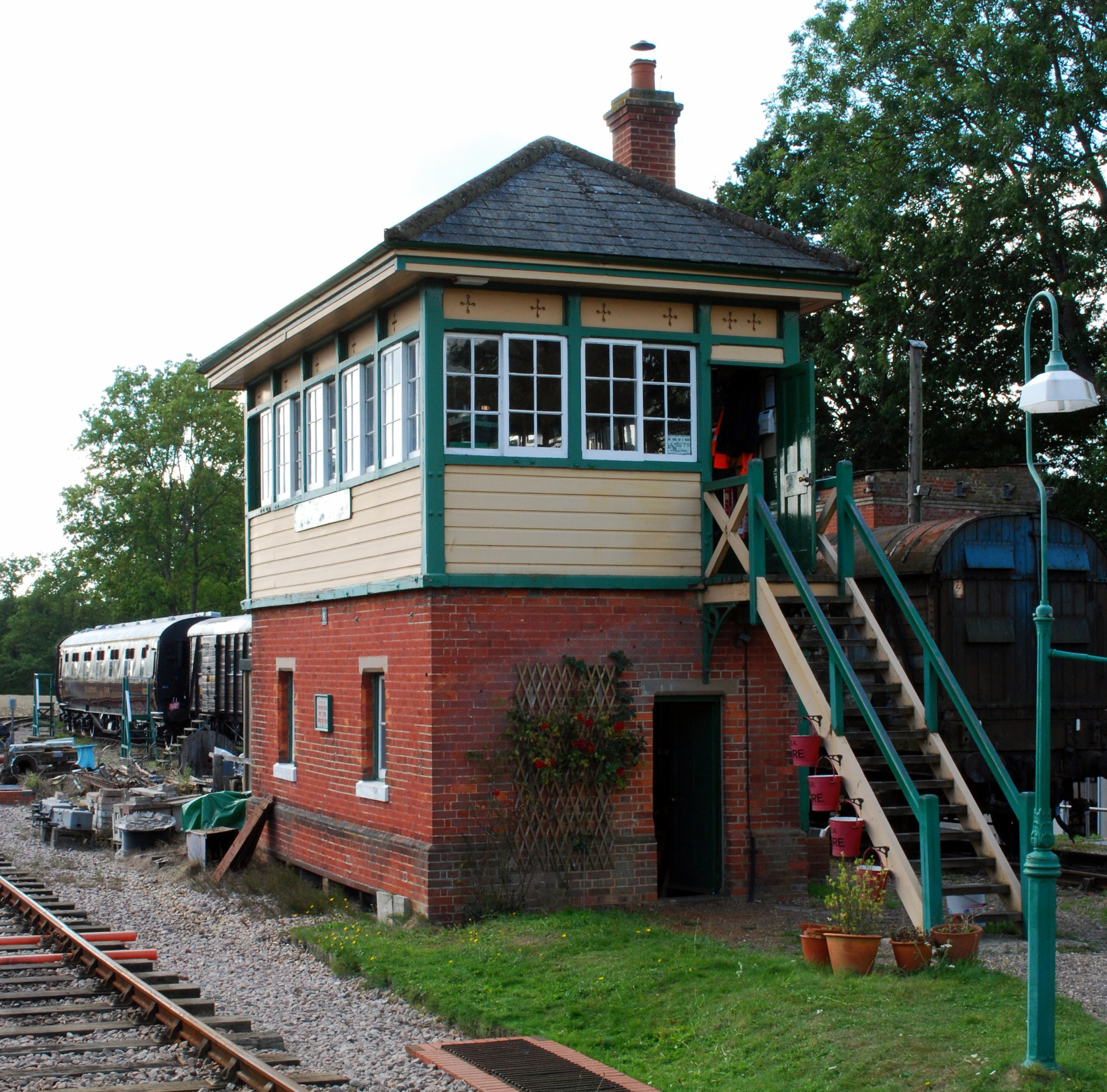
The signal box at Horsted Keynes

As well as stations, Myres designed many ancillary buildings including waiting shelters, footbridges, signal boxes, goods sheds etc. Goods sheds were provided to Myres's designs at Hassocks, Heathfield, Mayfield, Rotherfield & Mark Cross and Singleton. All have now been demolished other than that at Singleton, which was listed as Grade II by English Heritage in April 2013. In the listing, English Heritage described the building as:

an elaborate brick building in 'Tudoresque' style with most unusual mullioned and transomed painted wooden panels with quatrefoils to the transoms and incised pargetted panels to the mullions. The exterior is virtually unaltered including a surviving wooden canopy and the interior retains its original kingpost roof and an internal iron crane. It is the only surviving goods shed built by LB&SCR in this style. No other railway goods shed in the country has these elaborate Tudor style pargetted panels.

At Horsted Keynes, the signal box and an engine house to the south of the station are also Grade II listed buildings. The signal box is described as "the only remaining Type 1 signal box on the LBSC line".

== Bibliography ==
- Caiger, Denis (July 2011). "Forgotten Singleton". The Southern Way (16). ISBN 978-1-906419-63-9.
- Clark, Paul (1979). The Chichester & Midhurst Railway. Turntable Publications. ISBN 0-902844-53-9.
- Gould, David (1983). Three Bridges to Tunbridge Wells. Oakwood Press. ISBN 0-85361-299-4.
- Gould, David (2003). The Croydon, Oxted & East Grinstead Railway. Oakwood Press. ISBN 0-85361-598-5.
- Green, Alan H. J. (July 2013). "The railway buildings of T. H. Myres". Newsletter of the Sussex Industrial Archaeology Society (159).
- Hoare, John (1979). Sussex Railway Architecture. Harvester Press. ISBN 0-85527-249-X.
- Kidner, R.W. (1981). The Oxted Line. Oakwood Press. ISBN 0-85361-103-3.
- Marx, Klaus (2000). An Illustrated History of the Lewes & East Grinstead Railway. Ian Allan Publishing. ISBN 0-86093-547-7.
- Smith, Keith; Mitchell, Vic (1981). Branch Lines to Midhurst. Middleton Press. ISBN 0-906520-01-0.
