= Frederick Banister =

English civil engineer (1823–1897)

Frederick Banister MICE
- Born: Frederick Dale Banister; 15 March 1823; London, England
- Died: 22 December 1897 (aged 74); Forest Row, East Sussex, England
- Resting place: Holy Trinity, Forest Row, East Sussex; 51.0981°N 0.0330°E
- Education: Preston Grammar School
- Occupations: Civil engineer, architect
- Years active: 1838–1896
- Employer: London, Brighton and South Coast Railway
- Known for: Chief Engineer, LB&SCR
- Notable work: Manchester, Bury and Rossendale Railway, Cliftonville Estate, 1862 extension of London Bridge, Bluebell Railway, Oxted Line, Port of Newhaven
- Predecessor: Robert Jacomb-Hood
- Successor: C.L. Morgan
- Board member of: LB&SCR
- Spouses: Nancy Eleanor Richardson (1847–1864) Her death; Annie Fisher(1866–1897) His death
- Children: Mary Elizabeth Banister, Herbert Banister, Katharine Mary Myres

Frederick Dale Banister MICE (15 March 1823 – 22 December 1897), was an English civil engineer, best known for his 35 years as the Chief Engineer of the London, Brighton and South Coast Railway (LB&SCR).

== Early life ==
Born in London on 15 March 1823, he was educated privately until his parents moved to Lancashire, where he completed his schooling at Preston Grammar School.

Articled as an apprentice to John J. Myres of Preston when he was aged 15, he gained experience in surveying and levelling, and in the valuation of damage caused to various properties by the construction of railways.

In 1844 he joined the civil engineering business of Charles Cawley, and was directly responsible for setting out the first few miles of the Manchester, Bury and Rossendale Railway (MB&RR). The proposed route through the Irwell Valley was approved by the Chief Inspector of Railways Major General Sir Charles W. Pasley on 23 September 1846. While undertaking the works, the MB&RR amalgamated with another proposed railway to form the East Lancashire Railway. Banister was subsequently placed in charge of preparing the surveys and necessary UK Parliament submissions to extend the line, which hence became part of the Lancashire and Yorkshire Railway.

== 1846–1849: Move to Brighton, first period with the LB&SCR ==
In light of his continuing but minor health issues, he was strongly advised by his physician to move to the South Coast of England. With this in mind he took a period of leave with relatives in Brighton, East Sussex in the Spring of 1846, during which he happened to obtain an appointment with Robert Jacomb-Hood, then Chief Engineer of the LB&SCR.

Appointed as an assistant engineer to Jacomb-Hood, he was placed in charge of the construction of the branchline from New Cross to the River Thames at Deptford Wharf, where he was to also design, survey and manage the construction of a new dock system to replace the 1844 closed Deptford dockyard.

== 1849–1859: Civil Engineer and Architect ==
After completing the line in 1849, Banister retired from the railway to set up his own Civil Engineering and Architecture business in Brighton. Engaged mostly in works in and around the Brighton area, his most notable piece was to lay out and begin the development of the Cliftonville Estate in modern Hove, the associated waterworks (both later sold to the LB&SCR), and building of model dwellings for the labouring classes, along the lines of models set out by the Terry family of York and the Cadbury family at Bournville, Worcestershire.

== 1860–1896: Chief Engineer, LB&SCR ==
After Samuel Laing retired as chairman of the LB&SCR at the end of 1855 to pursue a political career, Deputy-Chairman Leo Schuster replaced him, instituting a policy of rapidly expanding new routes throughout South London, Sussex, and East Surrey. Some of these routes were financed and built by the company itself, while others were built by independent local companies, set up with the intention of connecting their town to the growing railway network, and with the intention of sale or lease to the LB&SCR.

On the retirement of Jacomb-Hood in 1860, Schuster appointed Banister as Chief Resident Engineer to LB&SCR. While Banister's Civil Engineering and Architecture practice had been successful, he had always kept contact with the railway, undertaking sub-contract works for them where requested. Schuster resultantly accelerated the speed of mileage increase of the LB&SCR, adding a further 177 miles (285 km) of track between 1857 and 1865.

The rapid growth of the LB&SCR came to a halt in 1866 with the collapse of London bankers Overend, Gurney and Company. The subsequent UK financial crisis the following year brought the railway to the brink of bankruptcy. A special meeting of shareholders was adjourned, and the powers of the board of directors were suspended pending receipt of a report into the financial affairs of the company and its prospects. The report made clear that the railway had over-extended itself with large capital projects sustained by profits from its passenger traffic, which suddenly declined as a result of the crisis. Several of the country lines were losing money, and resultantly Schuster was forced to resign in favour of new chairman Peter Northall Lawrie. This led to a period of network consolidation, and engineering adjustment of the LB&SCR system by Banister to cope only with defined traffic bottlenecks. It was not until the return of Laing as chairman in 1867 and the financial upturn from the 1870s, that Banister was again requested to design and survey new railway projects.

=== Major projects ===
During his 35 years in residence as Chief Engineer, Banister was responsible for identifying and then the design, surveying and construction of all the extensions and important works to be undertaken by the LB&SCR. These included:

- 1862 South London line extension to London Bridge: this involved the construction of 1.5 miles (2.4 km) of viaduct for three lines of rails; and the construction of a 186 feet (57 m) bow-string-girder bridge over Bacon's tannery
- 1862 extension of London Bridge: Banister gained an Act of Parliament to enlarge London Bridge further, building four more platforms in an adjoining area to the south to cope with additional traffic generated by the completion of the South London line and other suburban lines, such as the Crystal Palace line, to Victoria station. In plans laidout and designs approved by Banister, J. Hawkshaw engineered and constructed a single-span trussed-arch roof measuring 88 by 655 ft (27 by 200 m).
- Design and engineering of the East Grinstead, Groombridge and Tunbridge Wells Railway: the extension of the Three Bridges to East Grinstead Railway to link with the SER at Tunbridge Wells Central via Tunbridge Wells West, in a race with the SER.
- Extensions to the Wealden Line: redesign railway access to Lewes and then Uckfield, before extending the Wealden Line to Eridge to link with the Three Bridges to Tunbridge Wells West line
- Widening of the line from Victoria to Streatham; and the widening of the line from East Croydon to Coulsdon
- 1876 Portsmouth extension: redesigning the existing Portsmouth Direct Line terminus at Portsmouth and Southsea, to allow extension of the tracks to a new station at Portsmouth Harbour, thus giving direct connection to the company's paddle steamer services to the Isle of Wight
- 1877 design of the Lewes and East Grinstead Railway: including Imberhorne Viaduct, now better known as the Bluebell Railway
- 1880 extension of the Cuckoo Line: extension of the Cuckoo Line north from Hailsham to Eridge
- 1881 construction of the Chichester to Midhurst railway: built to a very grand style with a double track loading gauge, despite only ever being single tracked. The stations conformed to Banister's preferred Italianate architecture style, each formed in the form of a large "Country House". Lavant and Cocking each had two platforms, while the grand Singleton was built with four platforms and long sidings for the Goodwood Racecourse traffic. Banister also extended and rebuilt Midhurst in the same architectural style
- 1884 construction of the Oxted Line: by now having passed the regional "race" stage, the LB&SCR and the South Eastern Railway (SER) co-operated on the design and construction of the Oxted Line from South Croydon to Eridge Junction on the SER's Redhill to Tonbridge Line. Banister then extended the LB&SCR's lines south from the joint station at Hurst Green in two directions: one to East Grinstead; and a later second to Eridge
- The extension of the Island line to Ryde Pier Head
- Rebuilding railway stations: Banister had a love of Italianate architecture, which is reflected in his rebuilding of various stations, including: Brighton; Chichester; East Croydon; Eastbourne; Epsom Downs; Newhaven; Seaford; Sutton; Tunbridge Wells

== Port of Newhaven ==
From 1864, under instruction from the LB&SCR, Banister designed the port and transport access system for the LB&SCR owned Newhaven docks. After guiding the required approvals through parliament, Banister personally managed the works without contractors.

The project began in 1864 with the construction of the Seaford Branch Line from the East Coastway Line at Lewes. This would allow the supply of building materials to enable construction of the port improvements at Newhaven. However, due to the financial crisis of 1867, the project was placed on indefinite hold.

It was not until 1870 that Laing gave Banister the approval to undertake the improvements to the docks at Newhaven, including:

- The provision of additional quays
- The construction of new sea-walls
- New entrance piers and lighthouses
- The building of a concrete breakwater, extending seawards for 800 yards (730 m).

The resultant works allowed access for the LB&SCR's new larger passenger steamships, and created through reclamation several new acres of land which were subsequently developed and then sub-leased to various industrial companies. The town of Newhaven greatly expanded on the back of the works, as they allowed a large increase in both trade and subsequently population.

== Retirement ==
After completing the widening of the Brighton Main Line from East Croydon to Coulsdon in January 1896, Banister retired from the LB&SCR again, replaced by Charles Langbridge Morgan.

Married twice, his first wife Nancy Eleanor Richardson (1823–1864), died at the age of 40 and is buried in Nunhead Cemetery. His second wife was Annie Fisher. Banister had ten children, including Mary Elizabeth Banister who died the year before him in 1895; and Herbert Banister who died in 1901. A third child, Katharine Mary married Thomas Myres (the son of his former master, John J. Myres) in 1871. Thomas Myres was an architect who designed many of the LBSCR's station buildings.

Banister died at his home in Forest Row, East Sussex on 22 December 1897. He is buried in the cemetery of Holy Trinity Church in Forest Row (plot No.194190), with the grave of his second wife in the adjacent plot.

His personal copies of various architectural drawings when designing buildings for the LB&SCR are held by the Royal Institute of British Architects.

Dale Road in Purley is thought to take its name after Banister. The street was laid and built up with houses destined for LB&SCR staff shortly after his death.
