= Midhurst (disambiguation) =

Midhurst is a market town and civil parish in Chichester District, West Sussex, England.

Midhurst may also refer to:

- Midhurst (electoral division), West Sussex, England
- Midhurst (UK electoral ward), West Sussex, England
- Midhurst (UK Parliament constituency), in existence from 1311 to 1885
- Midhurst (LSWR) railway station, open from 1864 to 1925
- Midhurst railway station, open from 1866 to 1964
- Midhurst, Ontario, Canada

== See also ==
- Midhirst, Taranaki, New Zealand
