= Newick =

Village and parish in East Sussex, England

Coordinates: 50.98°N 0.02°E

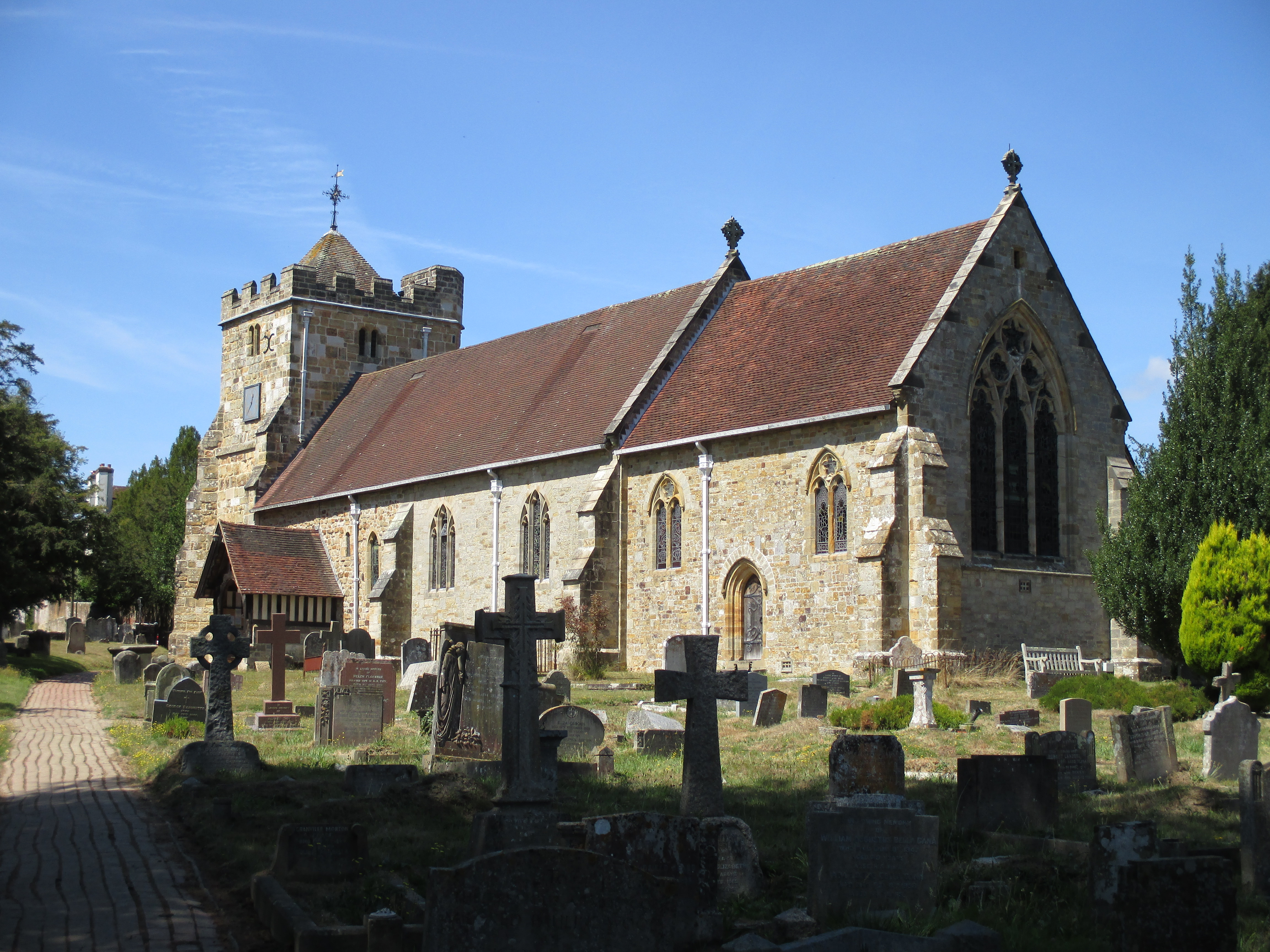
- St. Mary's Church

- Location within East Sussex
- Area: 7.8 km^{2} (3.0 sq mi)
- Population: 2,457 (2011)
  - Density: 778/sq mi (300/km^{2})
- OS grid reference: TQ415215
  - London: 37 miles (60 km) N
- Civil parish: Newick
- District: Lewes
- Shire county: East Sussex
- Region: South East
- Country: England
- Sovereign state: United Kingdom
- Post town: LEWES
- Postcode district: BN8
- Dialling code: 01825
- Police: Sussex
- Fire: East Sussex
- Ambulance: South East Coast
- UK Parliament: East Grinstead and Uckfield

Newick is a village, civil parish and electoral ward in the Lewes District of East Sussex, England. It is located on the A272 road six miles (9.7 km) east of Haywards Heath.

The parish church, St. Mary's, dates mainly from the Victorian era, but still has a Norman window. Zion Chapel, a Strict Baptist chapel, was built in 1834 and converted to flats in 2001. Newick Evangelical Free Church, originally a mission hall, opened in 1892.

The village is home to three pubs (The Crown Inn, The Royal Oak, and The Bull Inn), one restaurant (Newick Tandoori), a butcher, a baker, a pharmacy, as well as a number of other businesses. There is also a primary school, a health centre, a village hall known originally as the 'Derek Hall', and a post office.

Like many other places in Sussex, Newick holds an annual Bonfire Night celebration on the Saturday before Lewes Bonfire Night. Many of the local bonfire societies join the procession.

== History ==
Newick was a dispersed settlement until the Second World War, when many more houses were built around Newick Green (TQ 418 213). Its medieval church (TQ 421 208) still stands in isolation to the south. Its stone is likely to have been quarried from the sand rock down near Founthill. Parts of the nave are 11th century, the chancel is 13th century, the porch is 14th century, and the tower is 15th century. The churchyard has largely been left and a lot of archaic vegetation still exists including green winged orchid, ox-eye daisy, cuckoo flower and meadow fungi.

There is a Newick Amateur Dramatic Society (NADS), with a youth sub-society: Newick Youth Theatre (Formerly known as the NADYS)

Newick has a King George's Field, a memorial to King George V.

== Notable buildings and areas ==
Notable areas around Newick

The Newick parish sits to the east of the River Ouse. To the north and east is Fletching, to the south is Barcombe and to its west is Chailey.

In the 16th century much of Newick was common land and animals were grazed by locals. The commons were part of the giant Chailey Commons complex. Newick retained its western commons until the middle of the 17th century, when Roeheath and Cinder Commons were almost all enclosed, however Little Roeheath (more a green than a common) still survives.

The land around Newick consists of acidic Hastings Beds, and have much hard sandstone, including sandy exposures at Founthill, south of Newick (TQ 421 200). The land is very fertile and big Wealden farms, such as the Newick and Sutton Hall Estate, have large arable fields in the area and much of the woodland and hedgerows are now gone. There are still woods around Newick, but they are not as big the Wealden Clay woods in the neighbouring parishes. The area in the south of the parish has several chalybeate springs. Along the north side verge of the A272 (TQ 424 213), west of Goldbridge, is famous for its purple-red betony display in July. Fifty herb species were counted here in one short visit in 2014. In 2021 this verge was very derelict and in danger of losing all its botanical display. The area in the south of the parish has several chalybeate springs.

=== Farms ===
Founthill Farmhouse (TQ 420 202) is Tudor, with unusually elaborate timber framing. The 'fount' bit of the name means well, or spring.

To the west of Founthill, along the valley, is Beechlands (TQ 417 202). There is a line of huge sweet chestnut pollards there, some alive and others dead, and there is a quarried sandstone outcrop, now made into ponds and rock garden, with wild daffodils on the slope to the east. The owners of Beechlands donated Mill Wood (TQ 412 204), a half ancient and half secondary wood, to the Woodland Trust. Tilehouse Farm (TQ 409 203) has a pre-war railway carriage that you pass on the footpath.

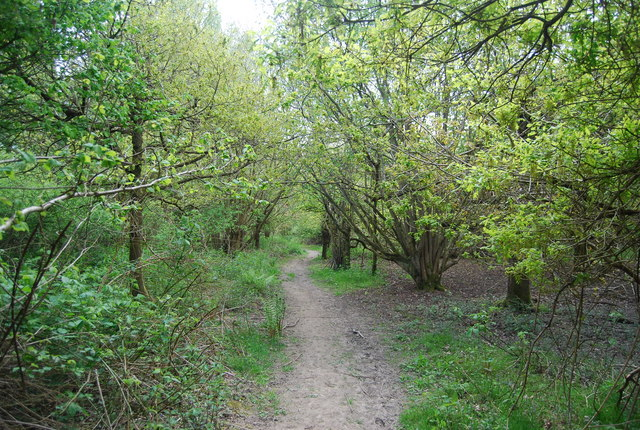
Footpath across Fletching Common - geograph.org.uk - 1953158

=== Fletching Common ===
Fletching Common (TQ 412 217) is outside the parish of Fletching itself. The area is now only a common in name and is no longer common land, although there are fragments of old common waste along Redgill Lane (TQ 404 217). It is still attractive even though it has lost the majority of its archaic vegetation.

=== Newick Park ===
Newick Park is at the south of the parish. The house sits at the head of a wooded gill tangled with rhododendrons, which descends to the Longford Stream. It was built in 1560 for iron master, but was extended greatly in the 18th century. It was once the home of William Joynson-Hicks, 1st Viscount Brentford. The Grade II* listed building was a country hotel, but is now a private house. There are wild daffodils on the grassy slope under the house, several old sweet chestnut trees, including a five span giant (TQ 422 195) and a good many oak by the Drive. The old walled garden has fine rhubarb beds (2014). West of the Park as far as Ridgeland Lane is wet alder carr (TQ 417 193 with much golden saxifrage and marsh marigold (kingcups). Ash is abundant in the swamp.

To the south of the Longford Stream (TQ 423 189) is bosky with bracken, old holly brakes and oldish beeches. The stream runs into Lower Park Pond. It is here that the name of the stream turns into the Lambourn Gill. The pond itself has lost much of its wild, archaic vegetation.

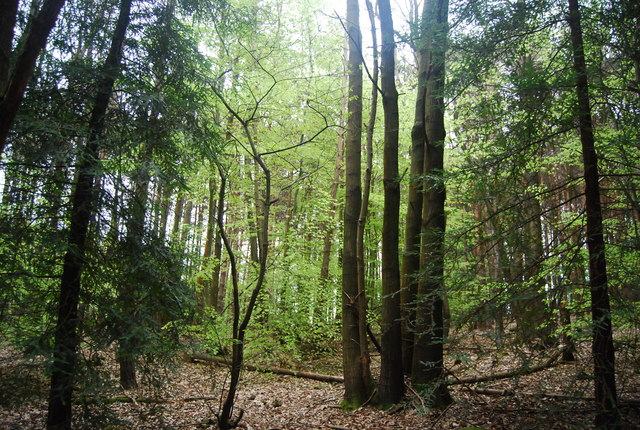
Rotherfield Wood - geograph.org.uk - 1955999

=== Woodland ===
Some of the woods in the Newick parish are heathy due to the sandstone ground and considerably different than the nearby woods on clay soils. Rotherfield (TQ 403 227) and Little Rotherfield Woods (TQ 409 224), just south of Sheffield Park Station, have heathy bilberry and cow wheat, devil's bit, tormentil and big wood ant nests. Little Rotherfield Wood has much oak coppice over a bare woodland boor. Rotherfield Wood was heavily coniferised by the Forestry Commission, but its heathy character was not eliminated, and large areas of bilberry survive along the east–west ride, with rowan and hard fern.

Where it is more hilly to the south east there are several good, ancient woods. Although they are on steep slopes, the Ardingly Sandstone offers resistance to erosion. For examaple, Broomlye Wood (TQ 429 201) is hornbeam coppice, with lots of old wooded pits (2012).

=== Streams ===
To the east of the parish is the River Ouse and to the south of the parish is the Longford Stream. Before the early 19th century, winter and rainy weather would cut this parish off from neighbouring parishes.

The river is a place to see kingfishers, leaping trout, banded and beautiful demoiselles and the banks contain yellowcress, hemp agrimony and himalayan balsam. Yellowhammers are often found on the sides of the stream, pied wagtails can be seen in gravel and clay banks, and grey wagtails can be seen in the weirs and pond bays.

The streams and brooks running into the river are often wooded with sheets of bluebells, sometimes with wild garlic, and sometimes with swamp alders. There are also brook meadows which is covered in anemones in early spring and much pignut and spring sedge, such as on the north bank between Cockfield Bridge (TQ 408 193) and Cockfield House (TQ 410 194) (2015).

== Rail transport ==
The village was formerly served by Newick and Chailey railway station on the East Grinstead to Lewes line, part of which remains as the Bluebell Railway. The line was closed by the Branch Line Committee long before British Rail's Beeching Report. The next station north was Sheffield Park and the next station south was Barcombe. Sheffield Park is still used by the Bluebell Railway.

== Twin towns ==
- Itteville, France
