= Bernard Holden =

British railway engineer (1908–2012)

- Born: Bernard John Holden; 15 March 1908; Barcombe, East Sussex, England
- Died: 4 October 2012 (aged 104); Ditchling, East Sussex, England
- Occupation(s): Railway engineer, soldier

Bernard John Holden MBE (15 March 1908 – 4 October 2012) was an English railway engineer and manager with Southern and British Railways and a founding father of standard gauge railway preservation in the United Kingdom. He was President of the Bluebell Railway in Sussex for over twenty years until his death.

== Biography ==
Bernard was born in the LBSCR railway station house at Barcombe in East Sussex on 15 March 1908 on a section of the Bluebell Line that no longer survives. He came from a family steeped in railway service as both his great grandfather, grandfather and father Charles were railway men. His father was the station master at Barcombe. In 1912 his father moved to the busier Steyning Station in West Sussex and Holden attended Steyning Grammar School matriculating in 1925 before following in the family tradition and joining the Southern Railway as a ballast train clerk also studying transport law and signalling.

At the outbreak of the Second World War Bernard relocated to London where his duties included supervising the evacuation of children from London and from his Redhill base, the supervision of trains bringing back soldiers from Dunkerque in 1940; 865 trains passed through in ten days. During the London Blitz Holden organised for trains to keep running often in circuitous routes as Luftwaffe bombing blocked numerous lines. In June 1941 he reported to Longmoor Military Railway and was posted to 191 Rail Operations Company Royal Engineers before being posted to South Africa and then to Bengal where he worked on the logistics of supplying British troops in Burma who were fighting the Japanese. He was commissioned into the Indian Army and spent much of the war engaged in operating railways in northern India, carrying troops and supplies to the front. In July 1945 Holden served in 8 Indian Engineers Group who were engaged in the invasion of Malaya. He entertained Vera Lynn before the Battle of Kohima in March 1944 becoming a lifelong friend of the singer. He was discharged from the army as a captain after VJ Day. He later recounted his experiences of running railways during the war in a biography published in 2004. He resumed his civilian railway career and joined British Railways upon nationalisation in 1948. He retired in 1972.

== Service with Bluebell Railway ==
In 1958 Bernard Holden and four other enthusiasts launched the Bluebell Preservation Society, ostensibly to reopen as a heritage railway the recently closed railway-line between East Grinstead and Lewes. John Leeroy was the first chairman of the Railway and Bernard was Signalling Engineer. Under his guidance the Bluebell Railway became the first preserved standard gauge steam-operated passenger railway in the world to operate a public service running its first services in August 1960, less than three years after the line from East Grinstead to Lewes had been closed by British Railways.

As an active Superintendent of the Line and later President of the Bluebell Society, Bernard Holden oversaw the retention and then the expansion of the railway from Sheffield Park to East Grinstead and in 1992 was appointed MBE for services to railway preservation. He was described as one of the greatest figures in the rail preservation movement of all time As President he witnessed the re-laying of track to a new terminus at East Grinstead, although he died a few months before official services were re-instated.

Bernard Holden died aged 104 at Ditchling, East Sussex, on 4 October 2012. His funeral cortège included a nine-mile ride on the Bluebell Railway. In March 2013 Brighton and Hove Council commissioned the naming of a bus after Holden.

== Bibliography ==
- Bernard Holden, Let Smoke Make Steam - an account of managing the railways in Great Britain and India during World War II (2004)
