= Rotherfield railway station =

Rotherfield has been the name of two stations in East Sussex:

- It was the original name of the station now called Crowborough, on the Oxted - Uckfield - Lewes line (Oxted Line)
- See also the nearby Rotherfield and Mark Cross railway station on the Oxted - Heathfield - Polegate line (Cuckoo Line)
