= Newick and Chailey railway station =

Former railway station in England

Coordinates: 50.9720°N 0.0063°W

Newick and Chailey
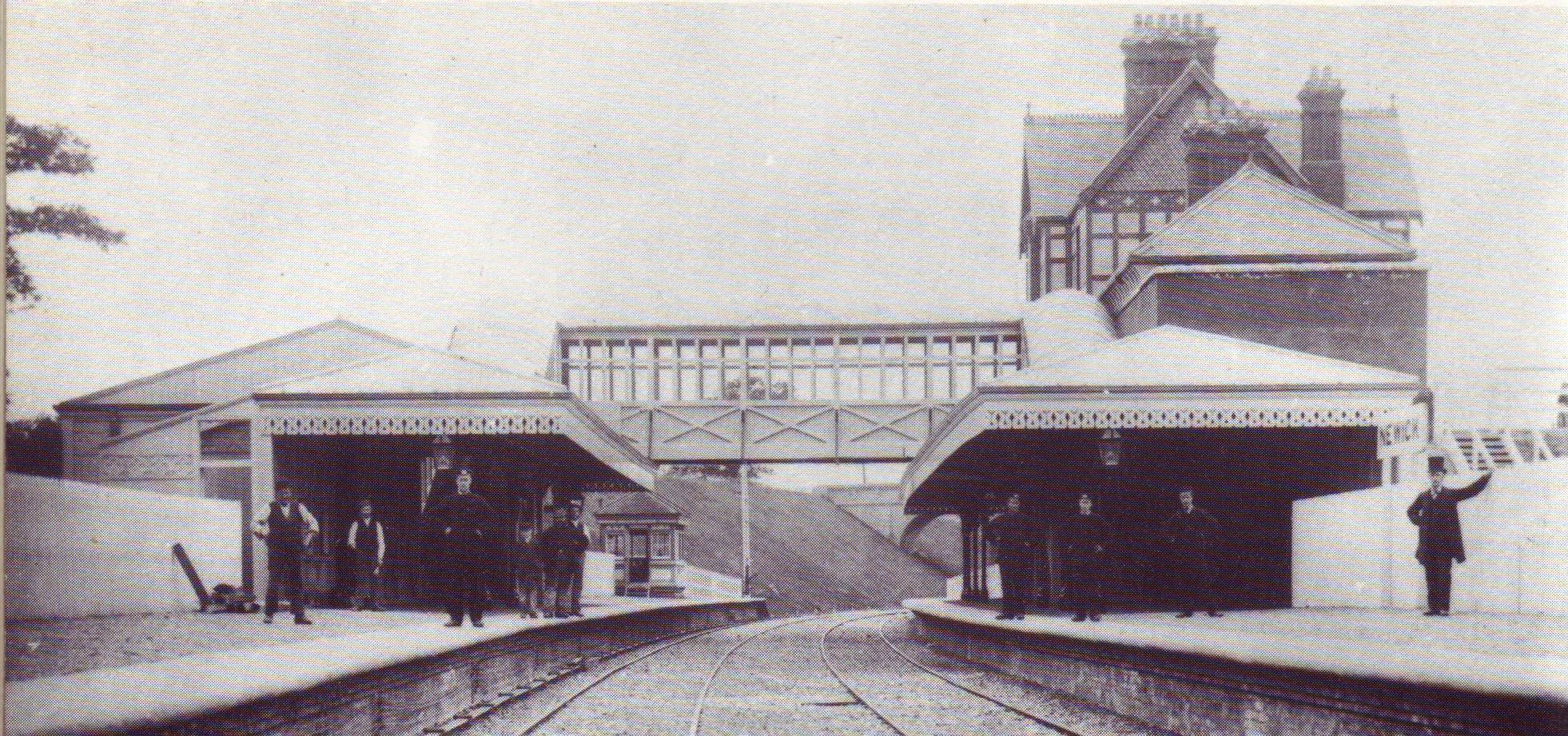

General information
- Location: North Chailey, Lewes District, East Sussex; England
- Grid reference: TQ400210
- Platforms: 2

Construction
- Architect: Thomas Myres

Other information
- Status: Disused

History
- Pre-grouping: London, Brighton and South Coast Railway
- Post-grouping: Southern Railway; Southern Region of British Railways

Key dates
- 1 August 1882: Opened
- 30 May 1955: Closed
- 7 August 1956: reopened
- 17 March 1958: Closed
Location

Newick and Chailey was a railway station located in North Chailey and located near the villages of Newick and Chailey in East Sussex, England. It was part of the East Grinstead to Lewes line, part of which now makes up the Bluebell Railway.

== Facilities ==
The station was located on the single line, but consisted of two side platforms on a loop line. There were substantial station buildings on each platform with a pedestrian footbridge connecting the two. The old Up platform had a restaurant facility and toilets until rationalisation in the 1930s which removed all the buildings on this platform and the footbridge span.

== Closure ==
Following the withdrawal of the services on the line in 1955, a Chailey resident, Margery Bessemer, forced its re-opening in 1956 for a short period when she discovered that the original Acts of Parliament which authorised the line's construction imposed a statutory obligation on British Railways to continue running services. British Railways responded by running the most meagre timetable possible, the so-called "Sulky Service". Parliament did eventually repeal the original Acts and the line closed in 1958.

The track was removed in 1960 and the station buildings were demolished around 1967–8. The site of the station platforms in a cutting was subsequently infilled and covered by housing. Short sections of the platforms have been excavated and preserved in the gardens of the houses on the former station site. Their site is identified in a road still today called Lower Station Road, North Chailey. Despite the reopening of part of the line by the Bluebell Railway, an extension south seems improbable, mostly due to the amount of resources it would take to reinstate the line, although the possibility has not been ruled out.

Preceding station	Disused railways	Following station
Sheffield Park; Line closed, station open	London, Brighton and South Coast Railway; Lewes and East Grinstead Railway	Barcombe; Line and station closed
