= Charles Langbridge Morgan (engineer) =

British civil engineer

- Born: 1 January 1855; Worcester, Worcestershire, England
- Died: 9 November 1940 (aged 85); Hove, Sussex, England
- Children: Charles Langbridge Morgan
- Engineering career
- Discipline: Civil,
- Institutions: Institution of Civil Engineers (president)

Sir Charles Langbridge Morgan CBE (1 January 1855 – 9 November 1940) was a British civil engineer. A railway engineer, he spent his early career on several railway construction projects before joining the Great Eastern Railway where his responsibilities included construction of Liverpool Street station. Morgan became chief engineer of the London, Brighton and South Coast Railway in 1896 and directed improvements to London Victoria station and Grosvenor Bridge. During the First World War Morgan was a lieutenant-colonel in the Royal Engineers, carrying out "special engineering duties" in Italy and France for the War Office. He later served as the army's deputy director of railways, on the advisory expert committee to the Ministry of Munitions and on the Disposal Board of the Disposal and Liquidation Commission.

== Railway career ==
Morgan was born on 1 January 1855 in Worcester, England. He was educated privately in Australia and England before commencing a pupillage under Edward Wilson in June 1870. Morgan completed this in 1877 and was employed as a chief engineering assistant in Wilson's firm, Messrs E Wilson & Company on railway engineering works. This included acting as resident engineer during the construction of the Banbury and Cheltenham Railway and as assistant engineer on the construction of several West Midland lines of the Great Western Railway.

Morgan was appointed assistant engineer to the Great Eastern Railway in 1883, under chief engineer John Wilson. Morgan had responsibility for maintenance of the entire network including the renewal of a large number of bridges and the company's expansion with new London approach lines, including the construction of the first Liverpool Street station. In 1896 he became chief engineer of the Newhaven Harbour Company, in February of the same year succeeding Frederick Banister as chief engineer of the London, Brighton and South Coast Railway (LB&SCR). At LB&SCR Morgan was responsible for the construction of the line between Stoat's Nest and Earlswood which freed the line from dependence upon the South Eastern Railway and renovation of the company's portion of Victoria station in London. He upgraded the section between Victoria and Balcombe to quadruple track, rebuilding most of the stations along that 32-mile section, and widened the Grosvenor Bridge over the Thames. Morgan retired in 1917 and was appointed to the board of directors, transferring to the board of the Southern Railway after the mergers mandated by the Railways Act 1921.

== War work ==
During the First World War he served in the British Army's Royal Engineers as a Lieutenant-Colonel. Morgan's son also served in the war, as an officer of the Royal Navy. During the war the elder Morgan undertook "special engineering duties" for the War Office in Italy and France. On 6 April 1917 he was appointed the British Army's Deputy Director of Railways, a position equivalent to appointment as assistant director of supplies and transport in the Army Service Corps, and also served as Commissioner of the Newhaven and Seaford Sea Defences in East Sussex. He was also a member of the Advisory Expert Committee of the Ministry of Munitions. Morgan was appointed a Commander of the Order of the British Empire in 1918.

After the war Morgan served as a member of the Disposal Board of the Disposal and Liquidation Commission, a government body formed to dispose of surplus war material, a body he was still a member of (with the rank of colonel) on 29 December 1922 when it was announced that he would receive a knighthood in the New Year Honours. The knighthood was conferred by King George V at Buckingham Palace on 15 February 1923.

Morgan was a member of the Territorial Army Engineer and Railway Staff Corps, an unpaid volunteer unit which provides technical expertise to the British Army. He resigned his commission as lieutenant-colonel in this corps on 18 February 1925; he had permission to retain his rank and to continue to wear the uniform.

== Personal life ==
He married Mary Watkins on 14 March 1883 in Redfern, New South Wales in Australia (to which her parents had immigrated). They had two sons, one also called Charles Langbridge Morgan who became a playwright and novelist, and two daughters. Their grandchildren included Shirley Paget, Marchioness of Anglesey and Roger Morgan.

From November 1923 to November 1924 Morgan served as president of the Institution of Civil Engineers, an organisation he had joined as an associate member on 9 January 1883. He had been appointed a member on 30 April 1889, served in the institutions council since November 1912 and held the position of vice-president since November 1919.

Morgan died on 9 November 1940 at Hove, Sussex.

Professional and academic associations
Preceded by William Maw	President of the Institution of Civil Engineers; November 1923 – November 1924	Succeeded by Basil Mott
