= Horam railway station =

Former railway station in England

Horam
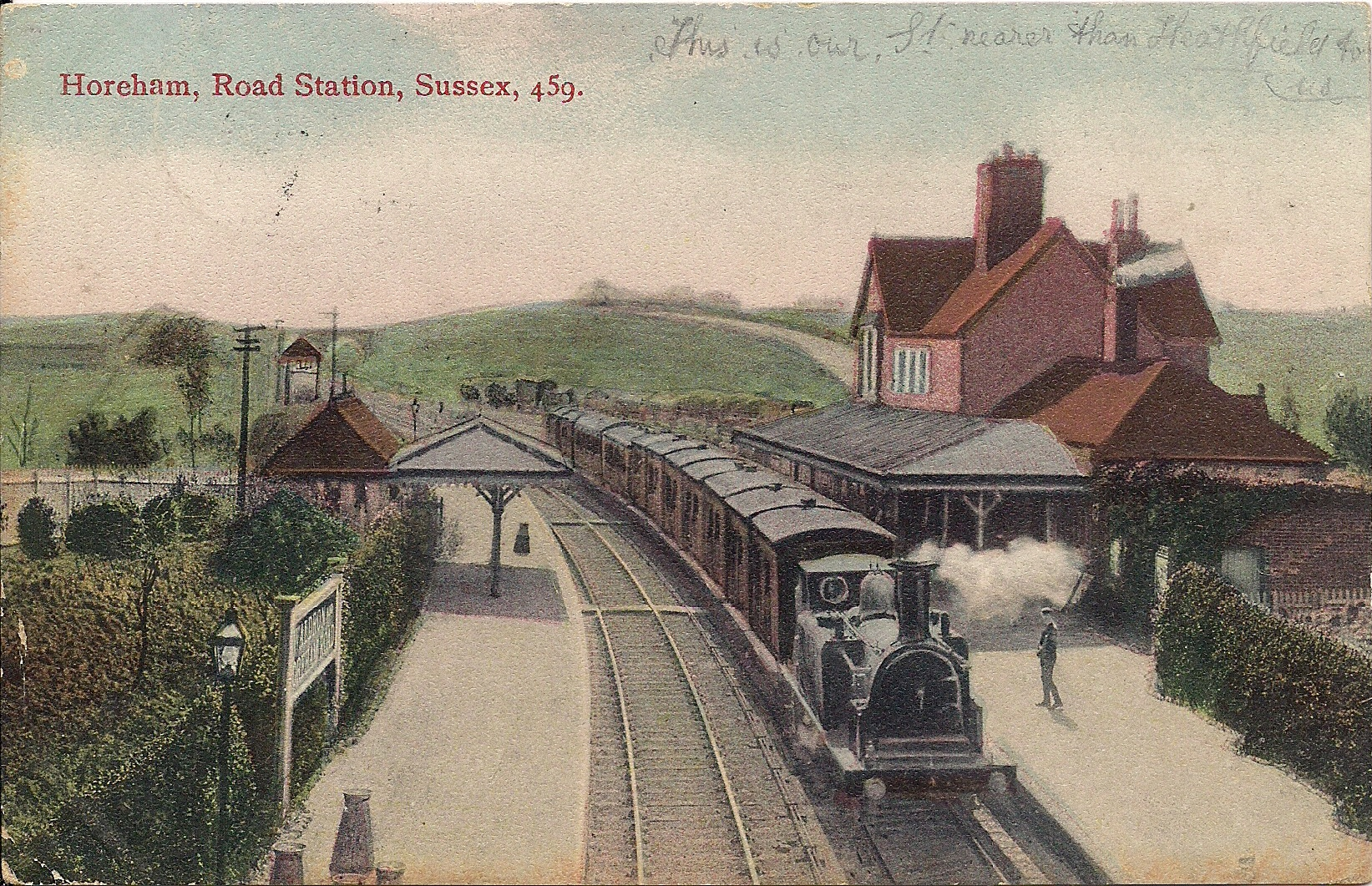

General information
- Location: Horam, Wealden; England
- Coordinates: 50.93472°N 0.24556°E
- Grid reference: TQ578174
- Platforms: 2

Construction
- Architect: Thomas Myres

Other information
- Status: Disused

History
- Original company: London, Brighton and South Coast Railway
- Pre-grouping: London, Brighton and South Coast Railway
- Post-grouping: Southern Railway; Southern Region of British Railways

Key dates
- 5 April 1880: Station opened as Horeham Road for Waldron
- 1 June 1890: Renamed Horeham Road and Waldron
- 1 April 1900: Renamed Waldron and Horeham Road
- 1 January 1935: Renamed Waldron and Horam
- 21 September 1953: Renamed Horam
- 14 June 1965: Station closed to passengers
Location

Horam railway station was on the Cuckoo Line between Hellingly and Heathfield, serving the village of Horam.

== History ==
The station was opened by the London, Brighton and South Coast Railway on 5 April 1880 and was originally named Horeham Road for Waldron. It was on the line extension from Hailsham to Eridge. It was renamed several times: on 1 June 1890 it became Horeham Road and Waldron; on 1 April 1900 Waldron and Horeham Road; on 1 January 1935 Waldron and Horam; and it finally became Horam on 21 September 1953.

The station closed to passenger traffic on 14 June 1965 but freight trains continued to pass through until 1968 when the line was closed completely.

Preceding station	Disused railways	Following station
Heathfield; Line and station closed	British Rail; Southern Region; Cuckoo Line	Hellingly; Line and station closed

== Present day ==
The Cuckoo Trail foot and cycle path runs over one of the platforms. Sections of the two platforms including a concrete nameboard, some lamp posts and seats are preserved. The rest of the station site is now a housing estate and a car park
