= Barcombe railway station =

Disused railway station in Barcombe, Lewes

Barcombe
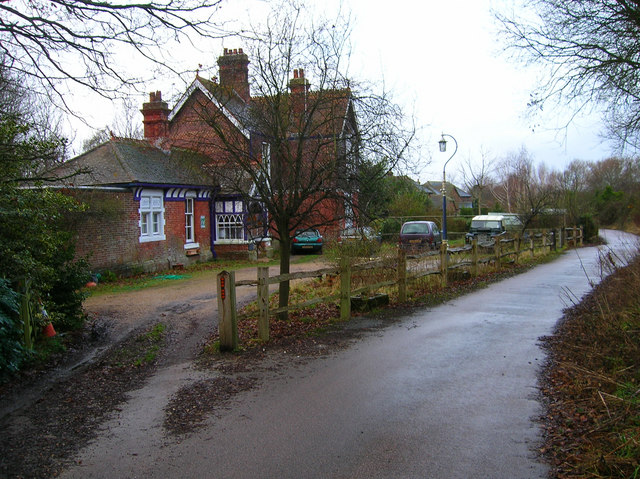

General information
- Location: Barcombe, Lewes District, East Sussex; England
- Coordinates: 50.9234°N 0.0155°E
- Grid reference: TQ416157
- Platforms: 1

Construction
- Architect: Thomas Myres

Other information
- Status: Disused

History
- Pre-grouping: London, Brighton and South Coast Railway
- Post-grouping: Southern Railway; Southern Region of British Railways

Key dates
- 1 August 1882: Opened as "New Barcombe"
- 1 January 1885: Renamed "Barcombe"
- 30 May 1955: Closed
Location

Barcombe was a railway station serving the village of Barcombe in East Sussex. It was part of the East Grinstead to Lewes line, part of which now makes up the Bluebell Railway. The station was originally opened as "New Barcombe" to distinguish it from the nearby station of Barcombe Mills (then called 'Barcombe') and was changed to its more usual name on 1 January 1885. In 1897 goods sidings were installed at a cost of £1450.

It was planned to close the line and the station on 13 June 1955, although they actually closed on 30 May due to a railway strike. The line closure was found to be illegal under the original acts authorising construction of the railway and British Railways were forced to reopen it in August 1956. However, the station was not reopened as it was not mentioned in the legislation.

After Parliament repealed the sections in question, the line was closed in March 1958 under the British Railways Branch-Line Report (prior to the Beeching Axe) and the track was lifted in 1960 from south of Sheffield Park to Culver Junction. Subsequently, Barcombe station building was sold and was converted into a private house. The platform edge is still visible but the trackbed has been infilled up to about one foot below platform level.

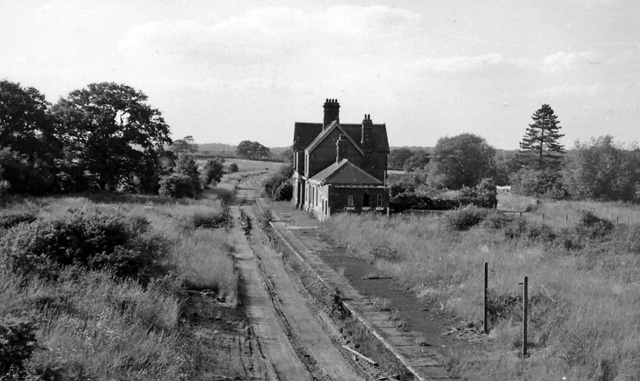
Barcombe station in 1961

Despite the re-opening of part of the East Grinstead-Lewes line by the Bluebell Railway, an extension south from its headquarters at Sheffield Park seems improbable in the short term as the intermediate station, Newick and Chailey is now covered by housing, and several overbridges would have to be rebuilt.

Preceding station	Disused railways	Following station
Newick and Chailey; Line and station closed	London, Brighton and South Coast Railway; Lewes and East Grinstead Railway	Lewes; Line closed, station open

== Miscellaneous ==
Bernard Holden, former president of the Bluebell Railway, was born in Barcombe Station in 1908. His father was the station master at the time.
