= Cocking railway station =

Former railway station in England

Coordinates: 50°57′6″N 0°45′23″W

Cocking
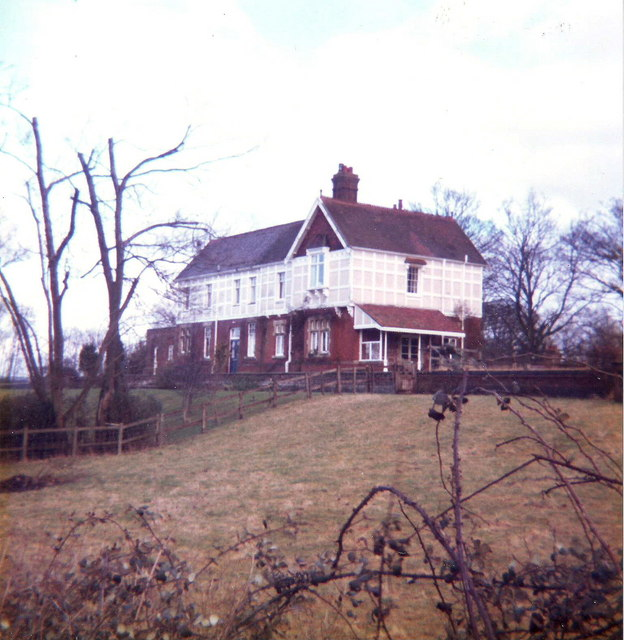
- Cocking Railway Station in January 1985

General information
- Location: Cocking, Chichester, West Sussex; England
- Grid reference: SU874176
- Platforms: 1

Other information
- Status: Disused

History
- Pre-grouping: London, Brighton and South Coast Railway
- Post-grouping: Southern Railway; Southern Region of British Railways

Key dates
- 11 July 1881: Station opened
- 6 July 1935: Station closed (passengers)
- 28 August 1953: Station closed (freight)
Location

Cocking Railway Station served the village of Cocking in West Sussex, England. It was on the former London Brighton and South Coast Railway line between Chichester and Midhurst. The station was designed by T. H. Myres, in his standardized Domestic Revival style, each formed like a large "Country House", similar to the stations on the Bluebell Railway.

== History ==
The station opened on 11 July 1881, but the traffic hoped for never really materialised. The station lost its passenger services after the last train on 6 July 1935, although freight continued. Services between Cocking and Midhurst were stopped completely by a washout of an embankment in November 1951, and Cocking became the terminus of the line from Chichester, until 28 August 1953 when it was completely closed. The station is now used as a private home.

== Accidents and incidents ==
In 1904, a freight train hauled by LB&SCR D1 class locomotive No. 239 Patcham was derailed near Cocking.

On 19 November 1951 a freight train hauled by LB&SCR C2X class locomotive no. 32522 was derailed between Cocking and Midhurst after part of an embankment was washed out as a result of a blocked culvert. The line was subsequently abandoned.

Preceding station	Disused railways	Following station
Midhurst	Midhurst Railways	Singleton
