= Midhurst railway station (London and South Western Railway) =

Former railway station in West Sussex, England

Midhurst (LSWR)
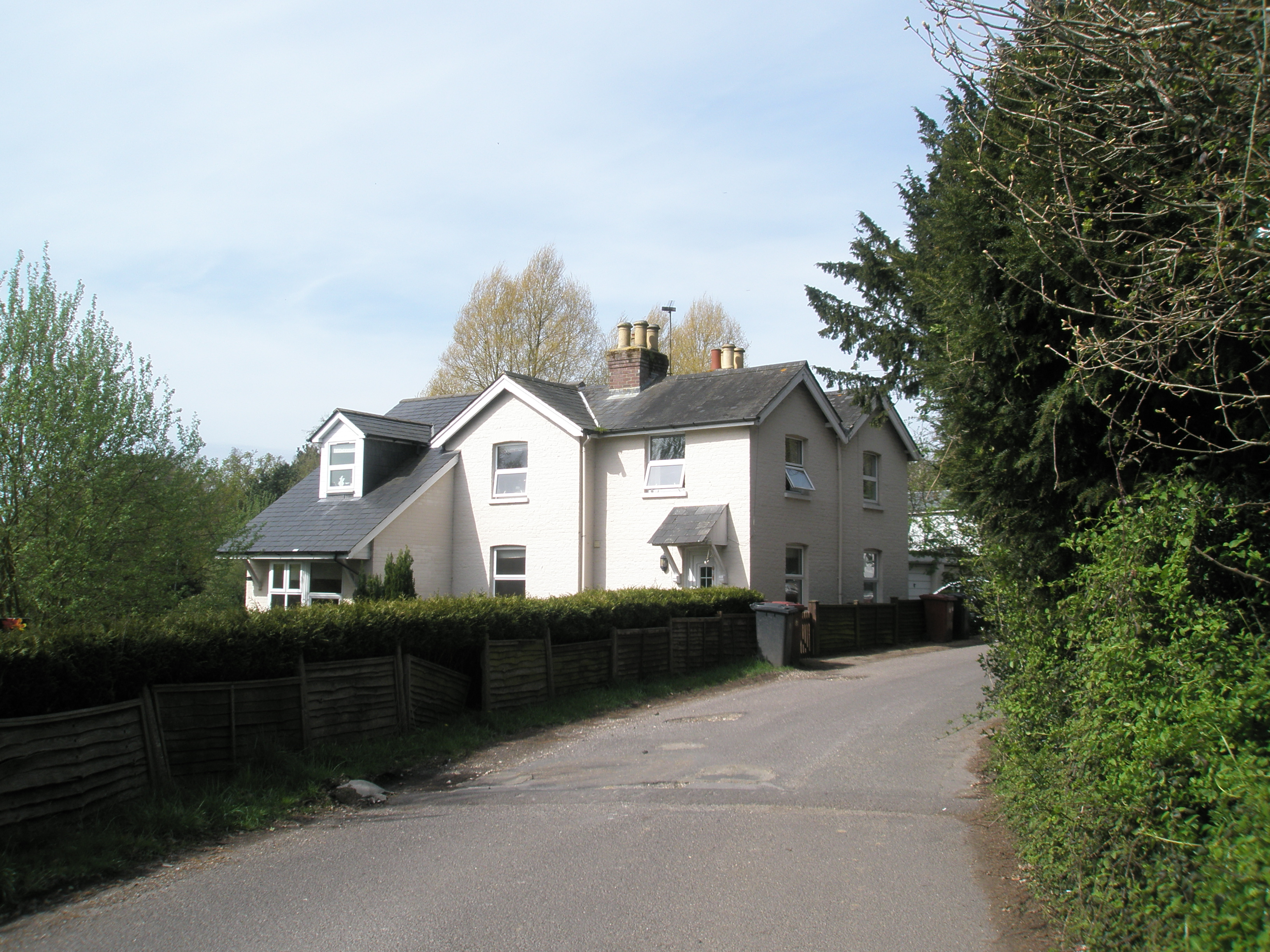
- Former railway cottages at the entrance to the site of the old station

General information
- Location: Midhurst, Chichester, England
- Coordinates: 50.9827°N 0.7495°W
- Grid reference: SU878211
- Platforms: 1

Other information
- Status: Disused

History
- Pre-grouping: London and South Western Railway
- Post-grouping: Southern Railway

Key dates
- 1 September 1864: Station opened
- 13 July 1925: Station closed
Location

Midhurst (LSWR) was one of two railway stations that served the market town of Midhurst, in West Sussex, England, between 1864 and 1925; the other was Midhurst.

== History ==
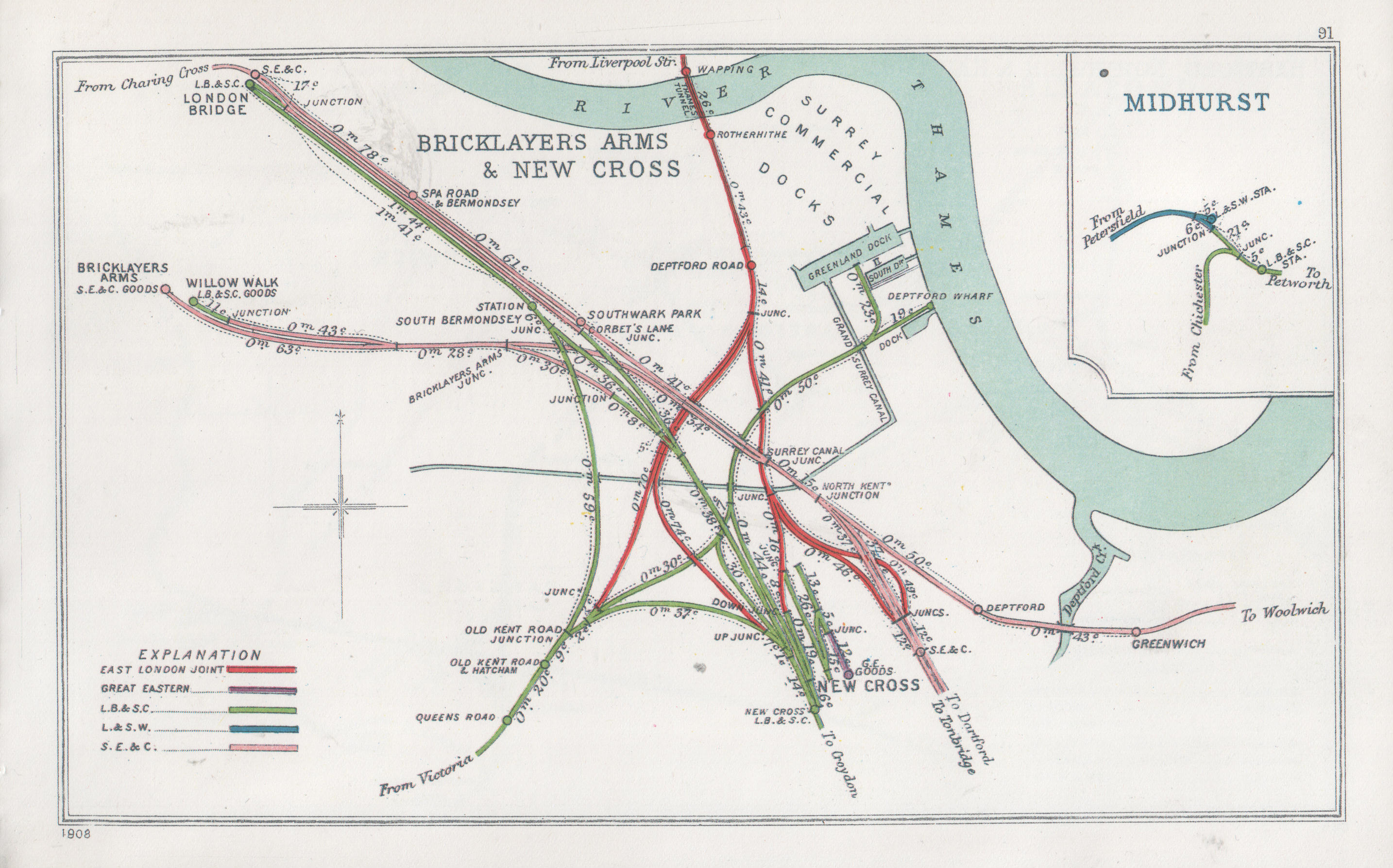
A 1908 Railway Clearing House map of lines around Midhurst

The station was opened on 1 September 1864 by the London and South Western Railway, the terminus of the line from Petersfield.

The station was closed on 13 July 1925, after the LSWR amalgamated with other railways to create the Southern Railway and services transferred to Midhurst's other station on the London Brighton and South Coast Railway. The goods yard remained for some time afterwards, surviving the closure of the LSWR line in 1955.

Preceding station	Disused railways	Following station
Elsted	Midhurst Railways	Midhurst (LBSCR)

== The site today ==
The station building has survived and is now in use as offices. Two converted railway cottages stand between this and the main road.
