= Singleton railway station (West Sussex) =

Former railway station in England

Coordinates: 50°54′37″N 0°46′6″W

Singleton
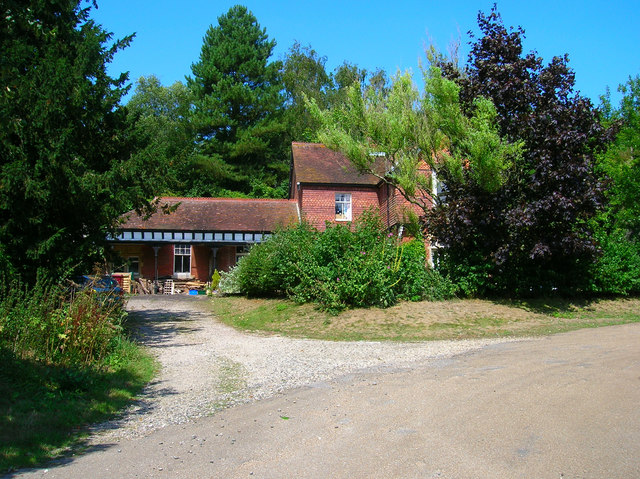

General information
- Location: Singleton, Chichester, West Sussex; England
- Grid reference: SU866130
- Platforms: 4

Other information
- Status: Disused

History
- Pre-grouping: London, Brighton and South Coast Railway
- Post-grouping: Southern Railway; Southern Region of British Railways

Key dates
- 11 July 1881: Station opened
- 7 July 1935: Station closed (passengers)
- 28 August 1953: Station closed (freight)
Location

Singleton railway station served the village of Singleton in West Sussex, England. The station was on the former line between Chichester and Midhurst, a branch of the Midhurst Railways. It opened on 11 July 1881, and closed to passengers with the line on 7 July 1935.

== History ==
The station opened on 11 July 1881. It was designed by T. H. Myres, was built in a grand way by its owners the London Brighton and South Coast Railway, which included four platforms, with a subway linking them and the 'Country House' style station building, buffets, long sidings for awaiting trains, a large goods shed for dealing with freight, and two signal boxes to control the station. The main reason for this large building was to deal with visitors to the Goodwood Racecourse, but passengers preferred to use Chichester Station mostly due to the walk uphill to the course from Singleton. It was one of the most visited stations by the LBSCR royal train as the Prince of Wales (later Edward VII) used to 'weekend' with the James family at West Dean House.

It closed to passengers with the line on 7 July 1935. Freight services remained until these were withdrawn on 28 August 1953 by British Railways. The station was later in use by a vineyard owner, but is now a private residence.

Historic England listed the former goods shed at Grade II in April 2013. This was followed by the former station building in March 2019. On 20 August 2025 the restoration of trackbed and platforms were completed and it was opened as an extension of the Centurion Way cycle and footpath.

Preceding station	Disused railways	Following station
Cocking	Midhurst Railways	Lavant
