= Heathfield railway station (East Sussex) =

Former railway station in England

Coordinates: 50°58′11″N 0°15′00″E

Heathfield
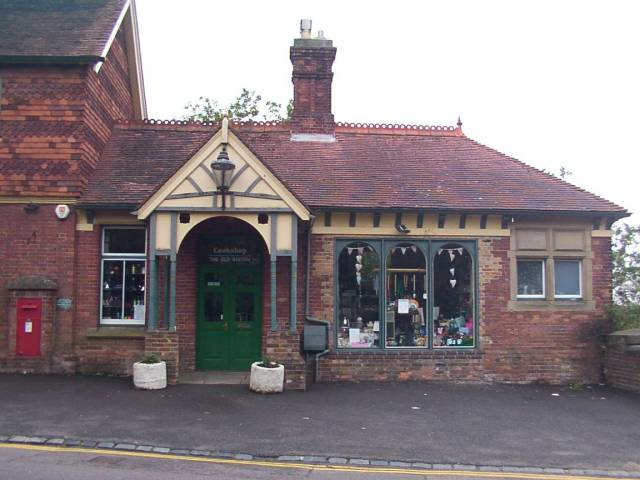

General information
- Location: Heathfield, Wealden; England
- Grid reference: TQ579213
- Platforms: 2

Other information
- Status: Disused

History
- Pre-grouping: London, Brighton and South Coast Railway
- Post-grouping: Southern Railway; Southern Region of British Railways

Key dates
- 5 April 1880: Station opened
- 14 June 1965: Station closed to passengers
- 26 April 1968: Station closed to freight
Location

Heathfield railway station was on the Cuckoo Line between Horam and Mayfield, serving the market town of Heathfield.

It was opened in 1880 by London, Brighton and South Coast Railway on the line extension from Hailsham to Eridge. The station was closed for passenger trains in 1965 but freight trains continued to serve the goods yard until 1968.

== Gas supply ==
In 1896, the LB&SCR drilled for water at the north end of the station. Natural gas was discovered at 312 feet (95 m). In 1898 and 1899, Charles Dawson gave several demonstrations with the gas and the railway began to use it to light the station. The natural gas was used for that purpose until February 1934, when the station was converted to town gas. The well was sealed in 1963.

== Present day ==
An industrial estate and car park now occupy much of the station site to the south-east. Above them at road level (the station approach), the booking office still survives as a shop and café.

As part of the extension to the Cuckoo Trail, the 265-yard (242 m)-long Heathfield tunnel north of the station was restored and reopened in 2002, with a lit footpath running through it and a skateboarding ramp just outside the south portal. The tunnel was closed following an alleged rape on 12 March 2005. A trial reopening period began on 26 March 2007, but it is now fully closed. In 2019, Wealden District Council stated: "due to constant vandalism and anti-social behaviour, the tunnel is to remain closed indefinitely with no plans to look into it".

Preceding station	Disused railways	Following station
Mayfield	British Rail; Southern Region; Cuckoo Line	Horam

== Other reading ==
- Elliott, A.C. (1989). The Cuckoo Line. Wild Swan Publications. ISBN 0906867630.
- The Historic Gas Times. June 2013. The Institution of Gas Engineers and Managers
