= Mayfield railway station =

Former railway station in England

Coordinates: 51°01′06″N 0°14′57″E

Mayfield
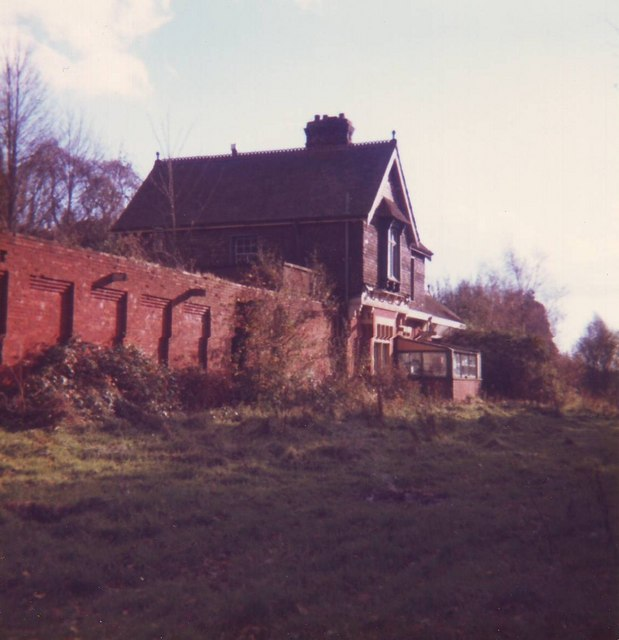
- The site of the station in 1986

General information
- Location: Mayfield, Wealden; England
- Grid reference: TQ578267
- Platforms: 2

Other information
- Status: Disused

History
- Pre-grouping: London, Brighton and South Coast Railway
- Post-grouping: Southern Railway; Southern Region of British Railways

Key dates
- 1 September 1880: Station opened
- 14 June 1965: Station closed to passengers
Location

Mayfield was a railway station on the now closed Eridge to Polegate cross country line (the Cuckoo Line). It was built by London, Brighton and South Coast Railway and closed under the Beeching Axe in 1965. The station building is now a private residence. The trackbed and platforms have been removed and their site is now the occupied by the Mayfield by-pass (A267).

Preceding station	Disused railways	Following station
Rotherfield & Mark Cross	British Rail; Southern Region; Cuckoo Line	Heathfield

== See also ==
- List of closed railway stations in Britain
