= Lavant railway station =

Closed railway station in West Sussex, England

Coordinates: 50°52′15″N 0°47′05″W

Lavant
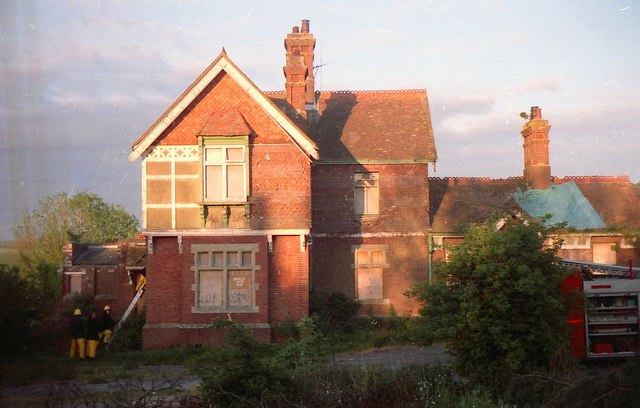
- Station building in 1988

General information
- Location: Lavant, Chichester, West Sussex; England
- Grid reference: SU855086
- Platforms: 1

Other information
- Status: Disused

History
- Pre-grouping: London, Brighton and South Coast Railway
- Post-grouping: Southern Railway; Southern Region of British Railways

Key dates
- 11 July 1881: Station opened
- 6 July 1935: Station closed (passengers)
- January 1970: Station closed completely
Location

Lavant Railway Station served the village group of Lavant in the county of West Sussex in England. It was on the former London Brighton and South Coast Railway line between Midhurst and Chichester. The station building design featured a booking office on the level of the road nearby, passengers having to descend by stairs to the platform situated in a cutting. The building was designed by T. H. Myres in the LB&SCR's Country House style, which can be seen on stations on the preserved Bluebell Railway.

The station opened on 11 July 1881, but passenger figures were not as hoped. The station lost its passenger services on 6 July 1935; freight, including sugar beet, remained. General freight services were withdrawn 3 August 1968, and sugar beet traffic continued only until January 1970; the station was now completely closed. The line was cut back south of the station to serve a gravel pit from 1972, but this in turn closed in 1991. The trackbed between here and the former junction with the West Coastway Line in Chichester is now part of the Centurion Way cycle path.

The station building is now a private residence.

Preceding station	Disused railways	Following station
Singleton	Midhurst Railways	Chichester
