= Midhurst railway station =

Former railway station in West Sussex, England

Midhurst
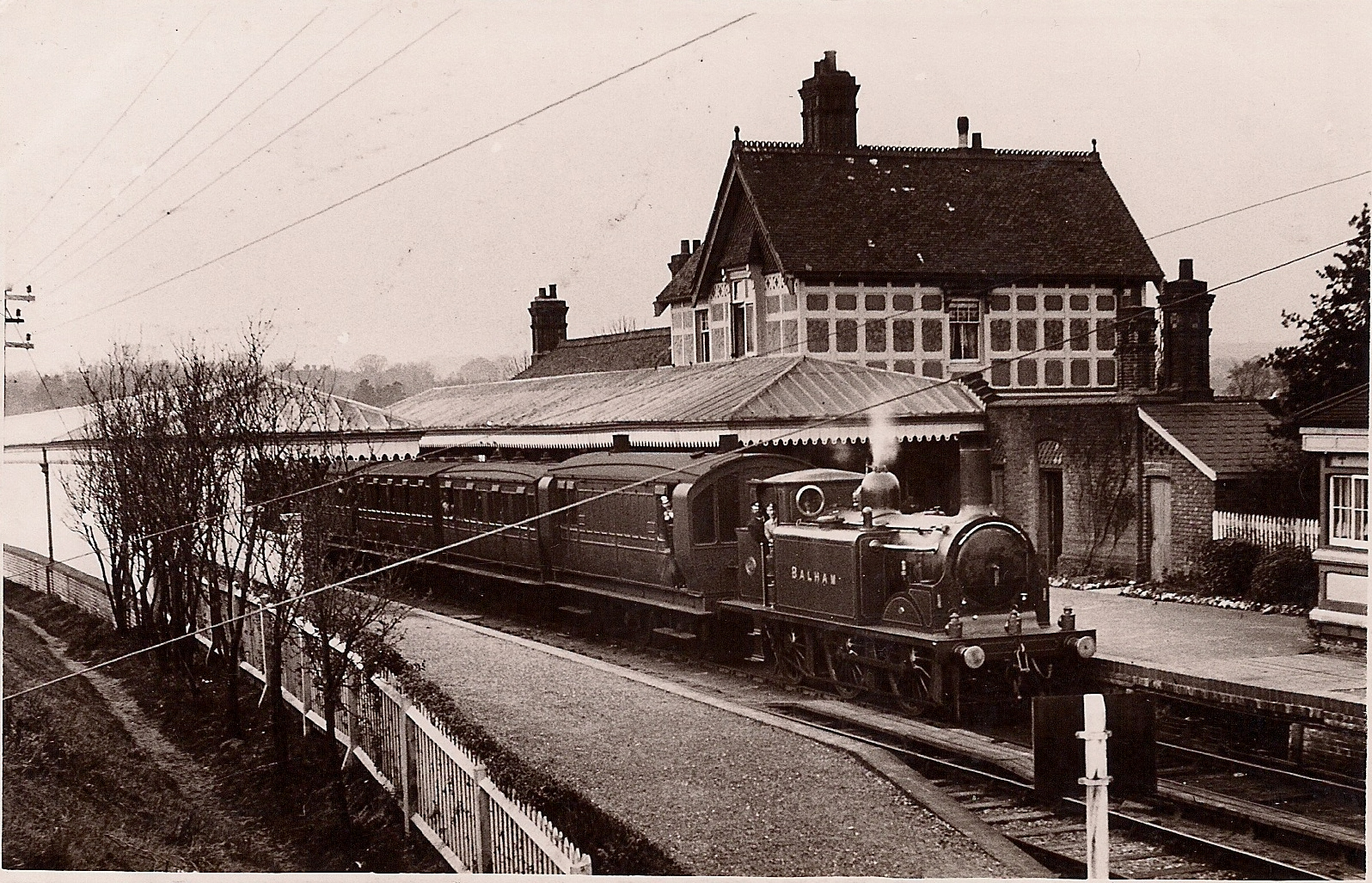
- LB&SCR D1 class no. 34 Balham at the station

General information
- Location: Midhurst, Chichester, England
- Coordinates: 50.9793°N 0.7425°W
- Grid reference: SU884207
- Platforms: 3

Construction
- Architect: Thomas Myres

Other information
- Status: Disused

History
- Pre-grouping: London, Brighton and South Coast Railway
- Post-grouping: Southern Railway; Southern Region of British Railways

Key dates
- 15 October 1866: Station opened
- 1881: Resited
- 7 February 1955: Station closed to passengers
- 16 October 1964: Station closed to freight
Location

Midhurst railway station served the market town of Midhurst, in West Sussex, England, between 1866 and 1964. It was a stop on the London, Brighton and South Coast Railway.

== History ==
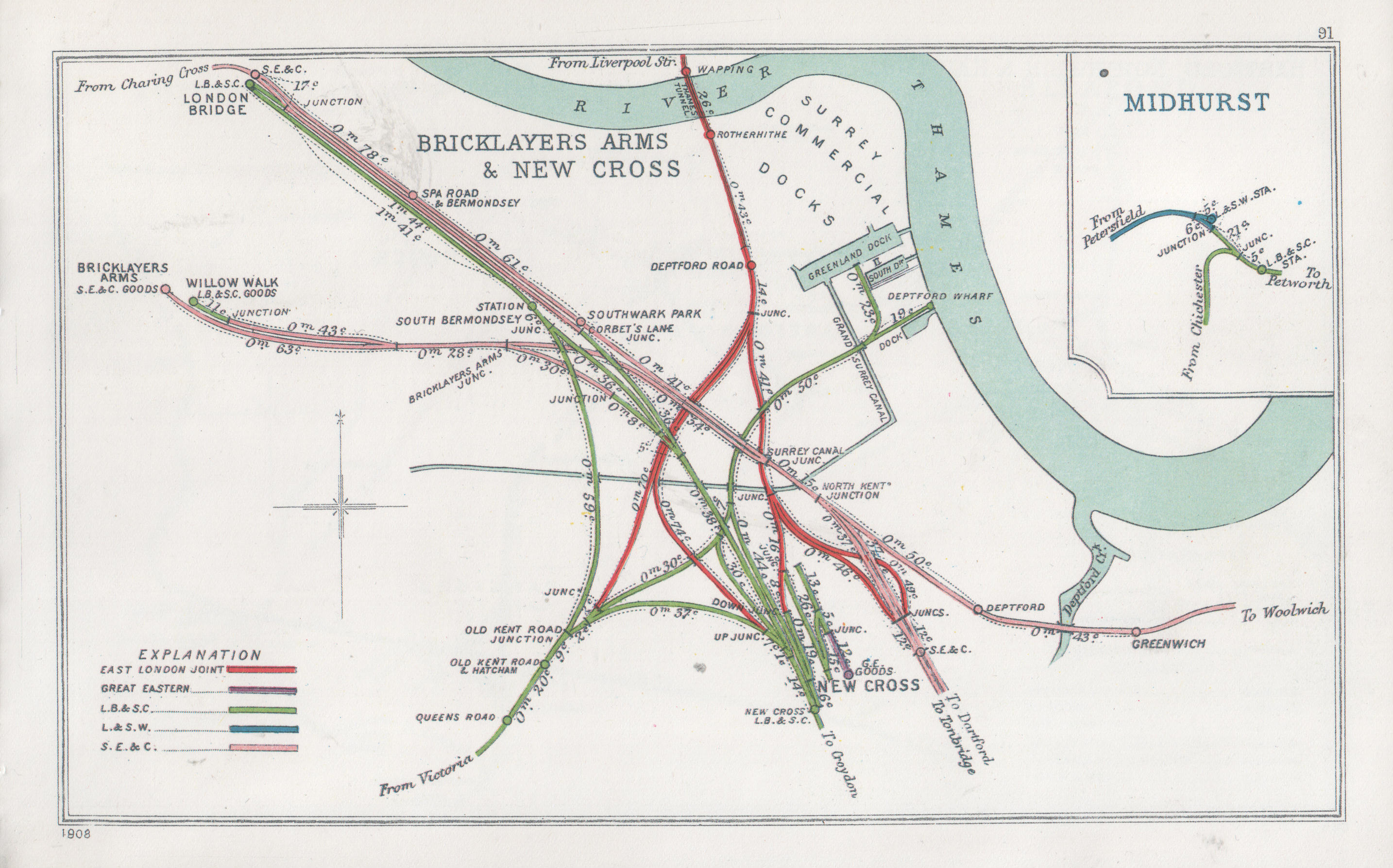
A 1908 Railway Clearing House map of lines around Midhurst

The first railway to reach the town was a branch line from Petersfield opened by the London & South Western Railway on 1 September 1864.

The London Brighton and South Coast Railway (LBSCR) opened a separate station on 15 October 1866, when the line from Pulborough via Petworth was opened. It was resited in 1881, when a further line from Chichester in the south opened, which was also constructed by the LBSCR. This new station was designed by T. H. Myres in the LBSCR's Country House design, which can still be seen at the preserved Bluebell Railway's stations. The station also had two signal boxes (although the Southern Railway closed one of these), while the original station continued to be used as a goods yard. An engine shed was also here but this was closed by the Southern Railway after 1923.

The former Midhurst (LSWR) railway station closed in 1925, when services were diverted to the former LBSCR station.

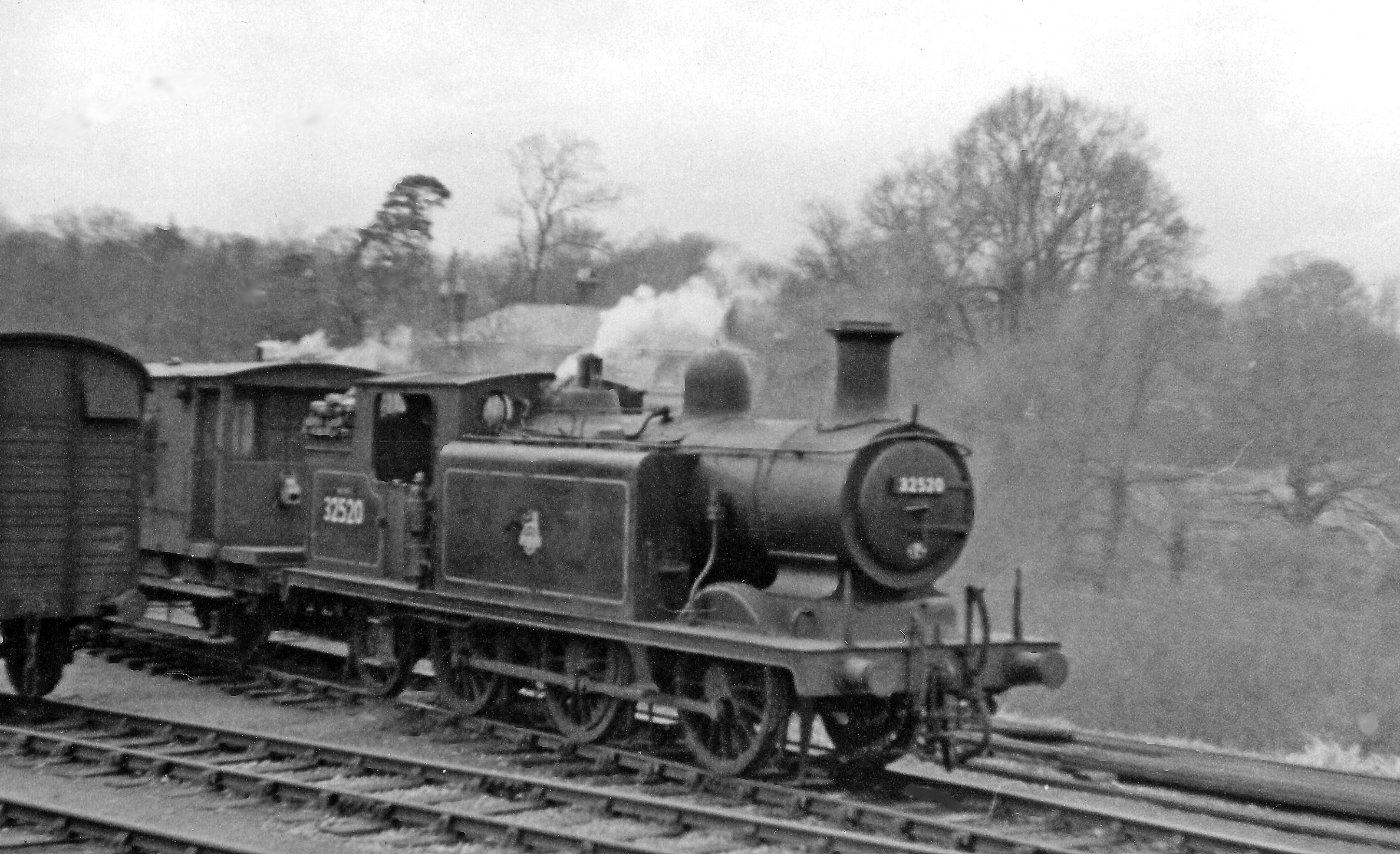
Ex-LB&SC E4 Class 0-6-2T shunting at Midhurst in 1955

The station closed to passengers after the last train on 5 February 1955, but freight services between Midhurst and Pulborough remained until 16 October 1964.

== Services ==
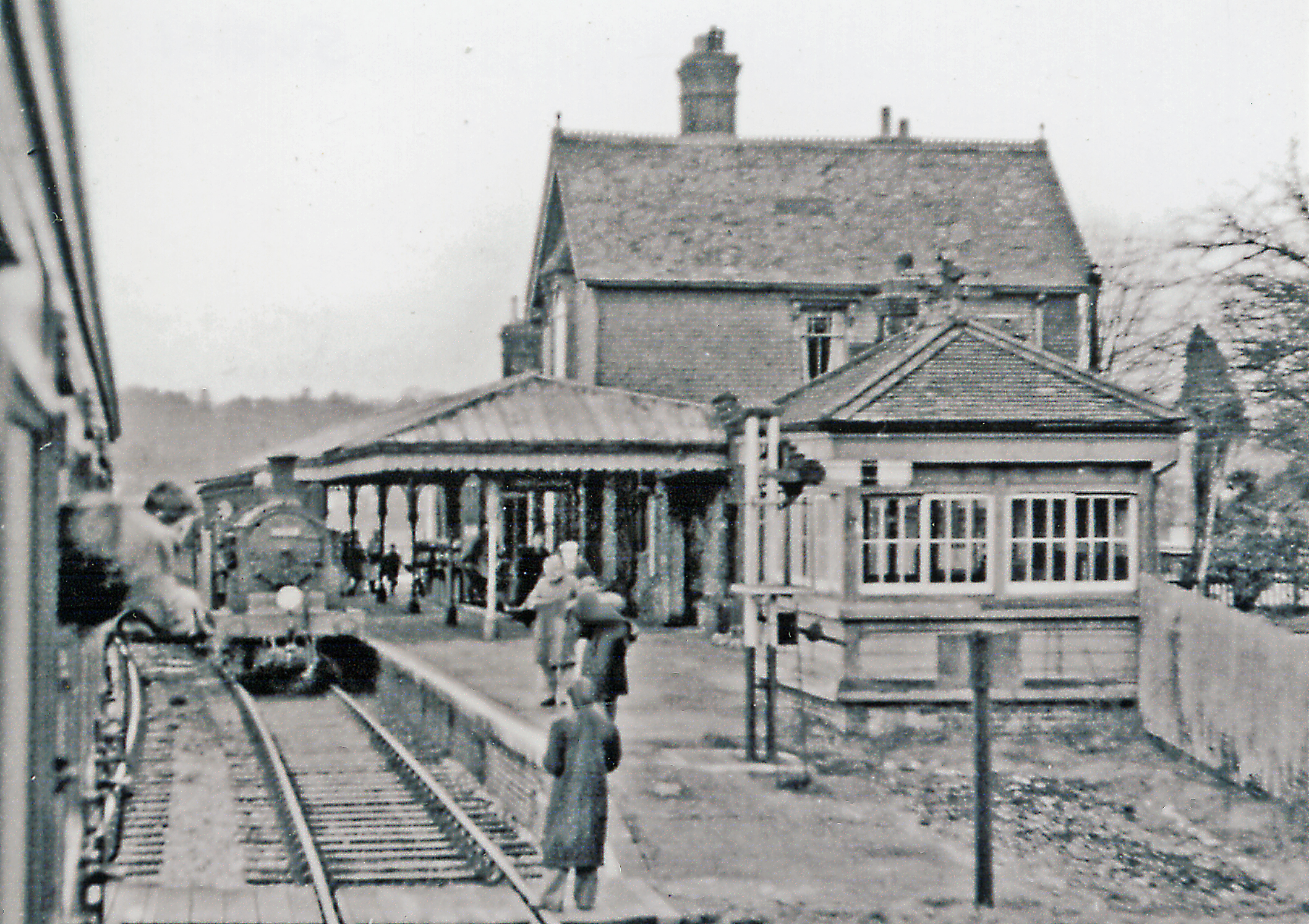
Last day of passenger services, 1955

Initially the line to Pulborough had five trains every weekday and two trains on Sunday; this pattern continued as through trains when the line to Chichester opened, with one of the weekday trains being a through train from London Victoria to Portsmouth.

All passenger services between Midhurst and Chichester were withdrawn on 8 July 1935, leaving a through Pulborough to Petersfield service, of which there were ten trains on weekdays connecting at both ends with services to London. In 1935, Sunday services consisted of six trains between Midhurst and Petersfield, but only three between Midhurst and Pulborough.

Preceding station	Disused railways	Following station
Selham	Midhurst Railways	Cocking
Midhurst (LSWR)	Midhurst Railways	Terminus

== The site today ==
The station was demolished and the site is now used for housing.

== See also ==
- Midhurst (LSWR) railway station
