= Rotherfield and Mark Cross railway station =

Former railway station in England

Coordinates: 51°03′03″N 0°13′57″E

Rotherfield & Mark Cross
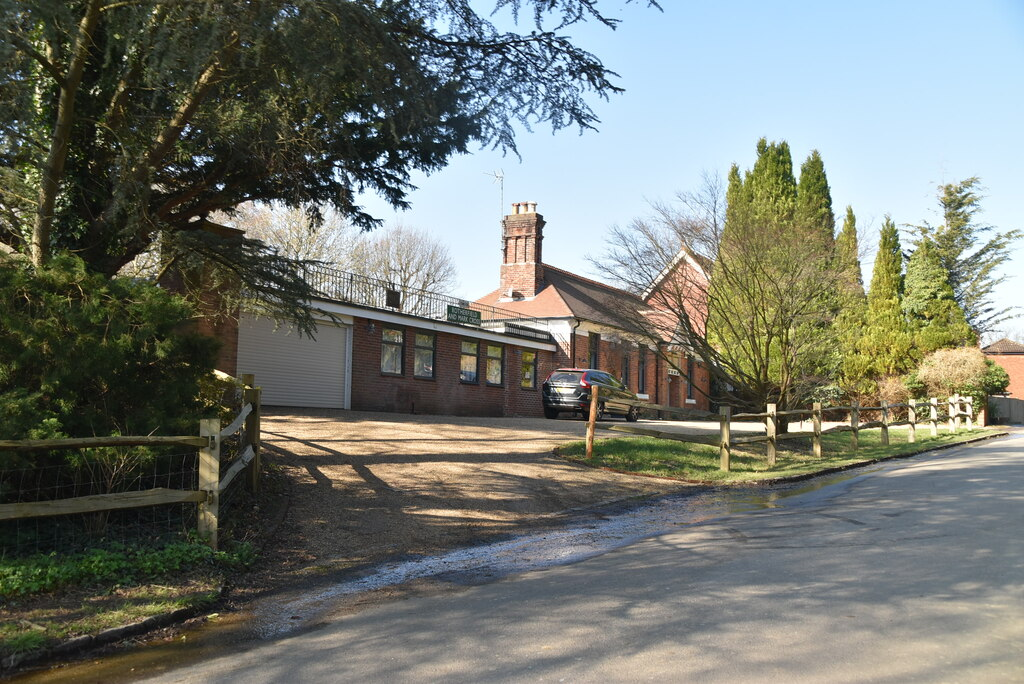
- The site of the station in 2021

General information
- Location: Rotherfield and Mark Cross, Wealden; England
- Grid reference: TQ565303
- Platforms: 2

Other information
- Status: Disused

History
- Pre-grouping: London, Brighton and South Coast Railway
- Post-grouping: Southern Railway; Southern Region of British Railways

Key dates
- 1 September 1880: Station opened as Rotherfield
- 1 November 1901: Name changed to Rotherfield and Mark Cross
- 14 June 1965: Station closed to passengers
Location

Rotherfield and Mark Cross (also Rotherfield) is a closed railway station on the former Eridge - Heathfield - Polegate railway (the Cuckoo Line) in East Sussex. The station was built by London, Brighton and South Coast Railway and closed with the line in 1965 (the "Beeching Axe").

The station building is still standing, and is in use as a private house.

Preceding station	Disused railways	Following station
Eridge	British Rail; Southern Region; Cuckoo Line	Mayfield
