= Sheffield Park railway station =

Heritage station in Sussex, England

Sheffield Park
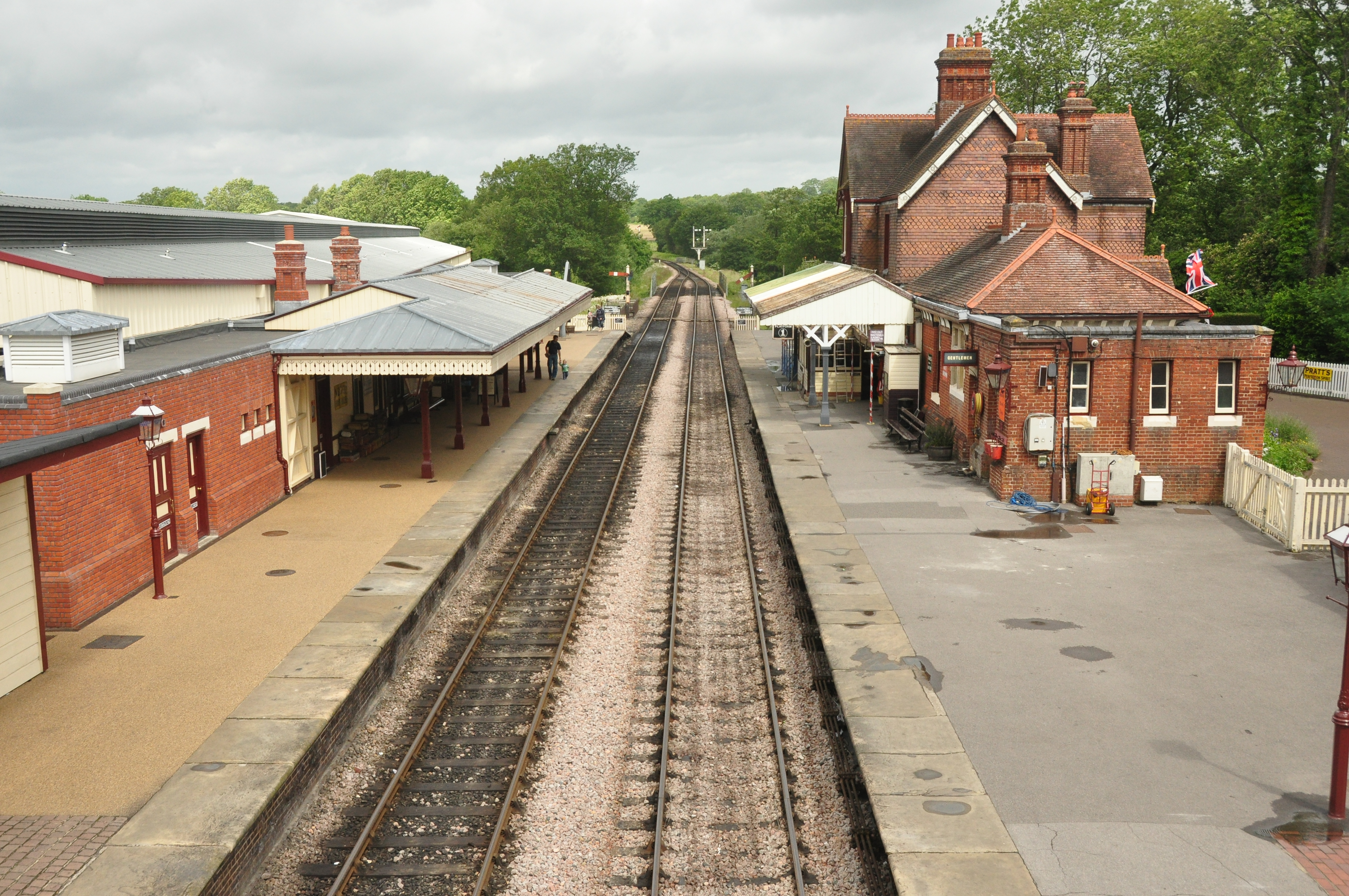
- A view of the station from the footbridge

General information
- Location: Fletching, Lewes District, East Sussex; England
- Coordinates: 50°59′44.31″N 0°00′03.86″W
- Grid reference: TQ404237
- System: Station on heritage railway
- Owner: Southern Railway; Southern Region of British Railways; Bluebell Railway
- Manager: London, Brighton and South Coast Railway
- Platforms: 2

Key dates
- August 1882: Opened
- 30 May 1955: closed
- August 1956: reopened
- 17 March 1958: Closed
- 7 August 1960: Reopened
Location

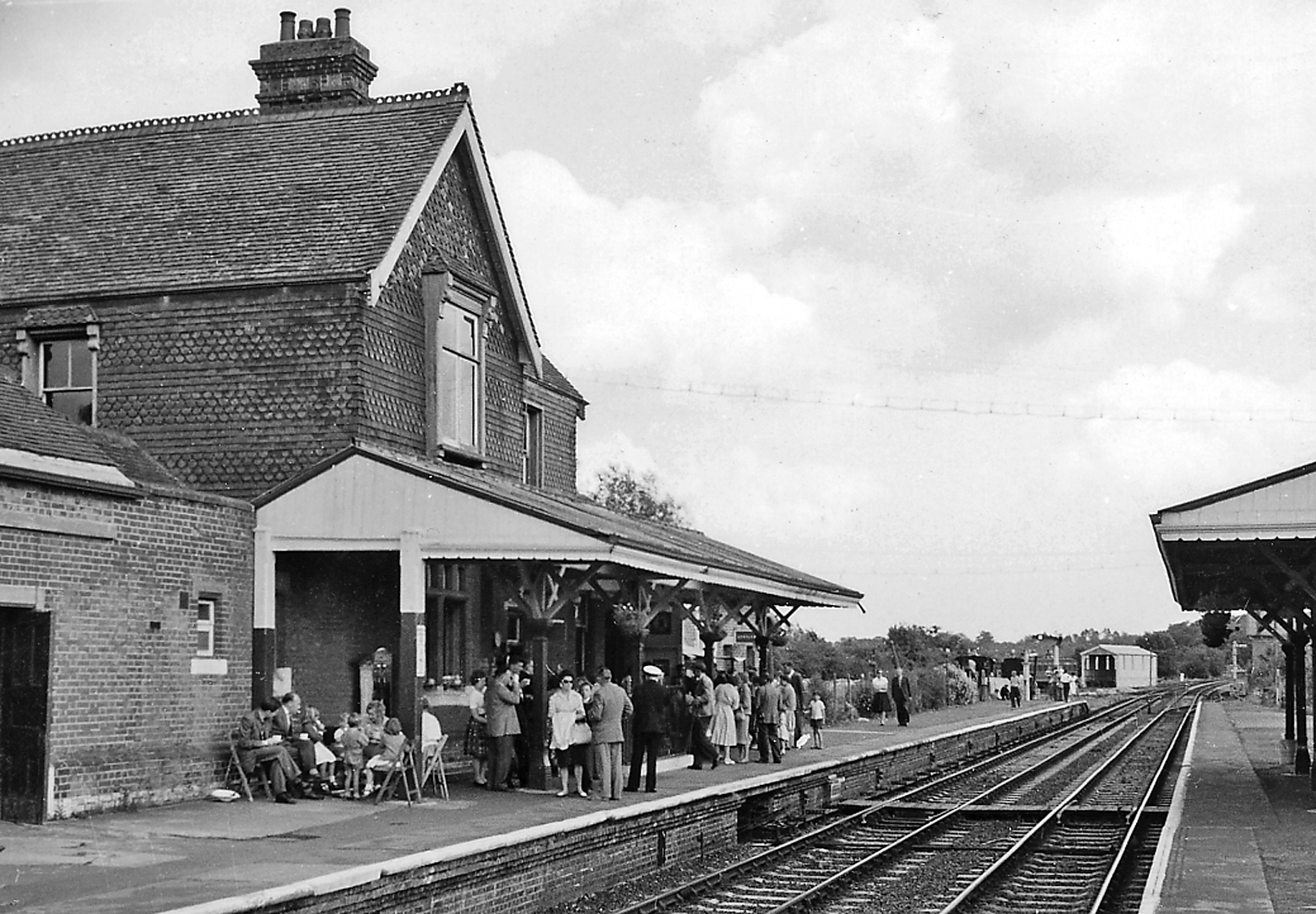
The station in the early days of the Bluebell Railway (1961)

Sheffield Park is the southern terminus of the Bluebell Railway and also the headquarters of the line. It is located on the southern bank of the River Ouse (which the line crosses just beyond the platforms) and is also situated on the Greenwich Meridian. It also neighbours 360 Degree Brewing Company which is named for the Greenwich Meridian and is famed for a cask best bitter called Bluebell which is named in honour of the Bluebell Railway.

== History ==
The station opened in 1882 at the request of the Earl of Sheffield, a local landowner and promoter of The Lewes and East Grinstead Railway Act 1877 which authorised the construction of a line from East Grinstead to Lewes, now popularly known as the Bluebell Railway. Originally named "Fletching and Sheffield Park", the name of the nearby village was dropped in 1883 following objections by the Earl. It was originally closed in May 1955 but was reopened in August 1956 after it was found the closure was illegal.

Following the line's closure in 1958, a group of students formed a society with the intention of preserving part of the East Grinstead to Lewes line. On 7 August 1960 the group began working a short stretch of line between Sheffield Park and Bluebell Halt, just south of Horsted Keynes which was leased to it by British Railways. By 1968, the group had raised enough funds to purchase both the Sheffield Park and Horsted Keynes stations, with the former now the Bluebell Railway's headquarters.

== Modern day use ==
The station now plays host to a shop, model railway, museum and the Bessemer Arms pub (named after Miss Bessemer who fought British Rail over the closure of the line claiming it to be illegal, and whose victory spurred the movement to save the line). The new combined shop and office block was opened in the late 1990s as the original shop was too cramped for the purpose. This was subsequently entirely demolished, creating an open area on the platform for picnic tables.

The station also houses the line's locomotive workshops and sheds, which are a major focal point for visitors to the line. It is restored in a LBSCR style of the start of the 20th century. An unusual signal box can be found on the platform, a popular feature being found at other small stations on the LBSCR where cost saving during SR days reduced manning to a Porter/Signalman. The structure of the box is post-preservation, replacing a fence enclosing what was little more than a ground frame. In the longer term a new signal box will be provided to the north of the station, roughly in the same position as the original North signal box, since the current frame is both life expired and too cramped to serve what is now a much busier station than it was ever intended to control.

Beside the station, with a separate entrance from the A275 is the former Woodpax yard, on which has been built a large carriage shed and adjoining Museum building; this project was known as "Operation Undercover". Construction work started in January 2010 with about three quarters of the money coming from the Heritage Lottery Fund. The project was completed in early 2012. It provides storage for many of the line's operational vintage carriages and the Pullman dining train.

== Future ==
An extension to the south has been mooted a few times, returning the line to its original southern terminus of Lewes; however this is likely to be near impossible as the next station on the line, Newick and Chailey, has been lost under housing, and the following station, Barcombe, is now in private hands. In addition, several road bridges would need to be replaced on the route, including one just south of Sheffield Park station.

Preceding station	Heritage railways	Following station
Horsted Keynes towards East Grinstead	Bluebell Railway	Terminus
	Disused railways	
Horsted Keynes; Line and station open	London, Brighton and South Coast Railway; Lewes and East Grinstead Railway	Newick and Chailey; Line and station closed

== Gallery ==
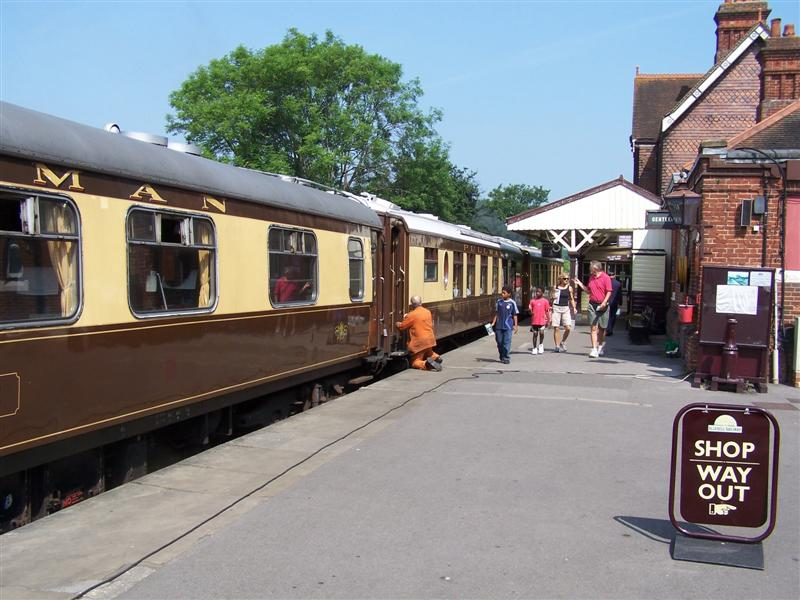
A Pullman train in Platform 1 at Sheffield Park

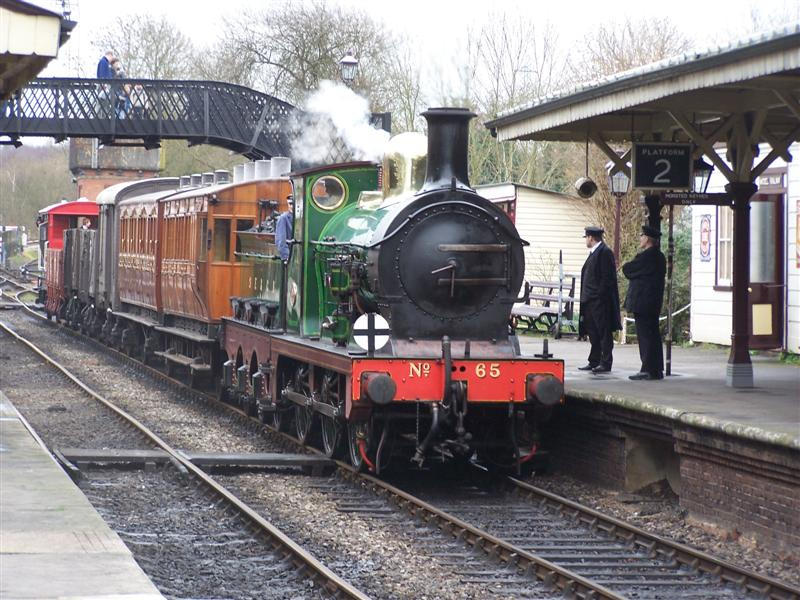
O1 no. 65 draws a train into Platform 2

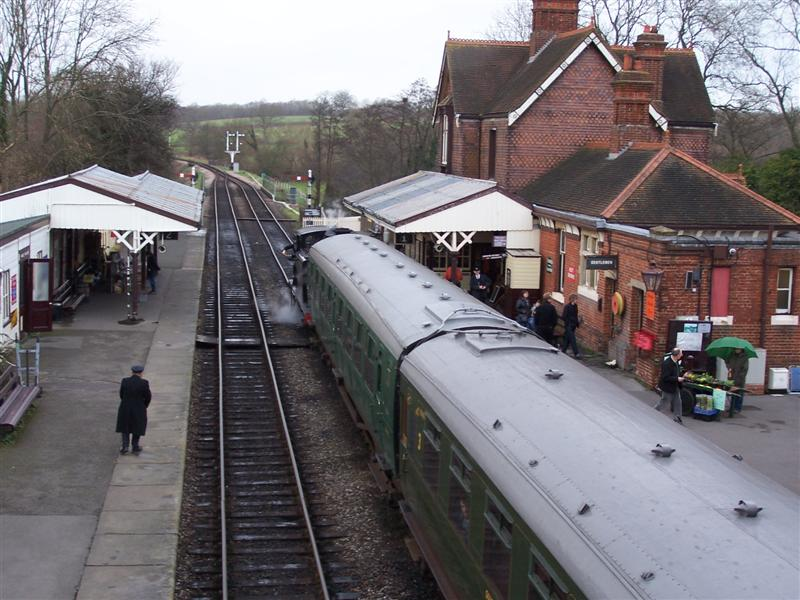
E4 no. 32473 waits under the impressive station building

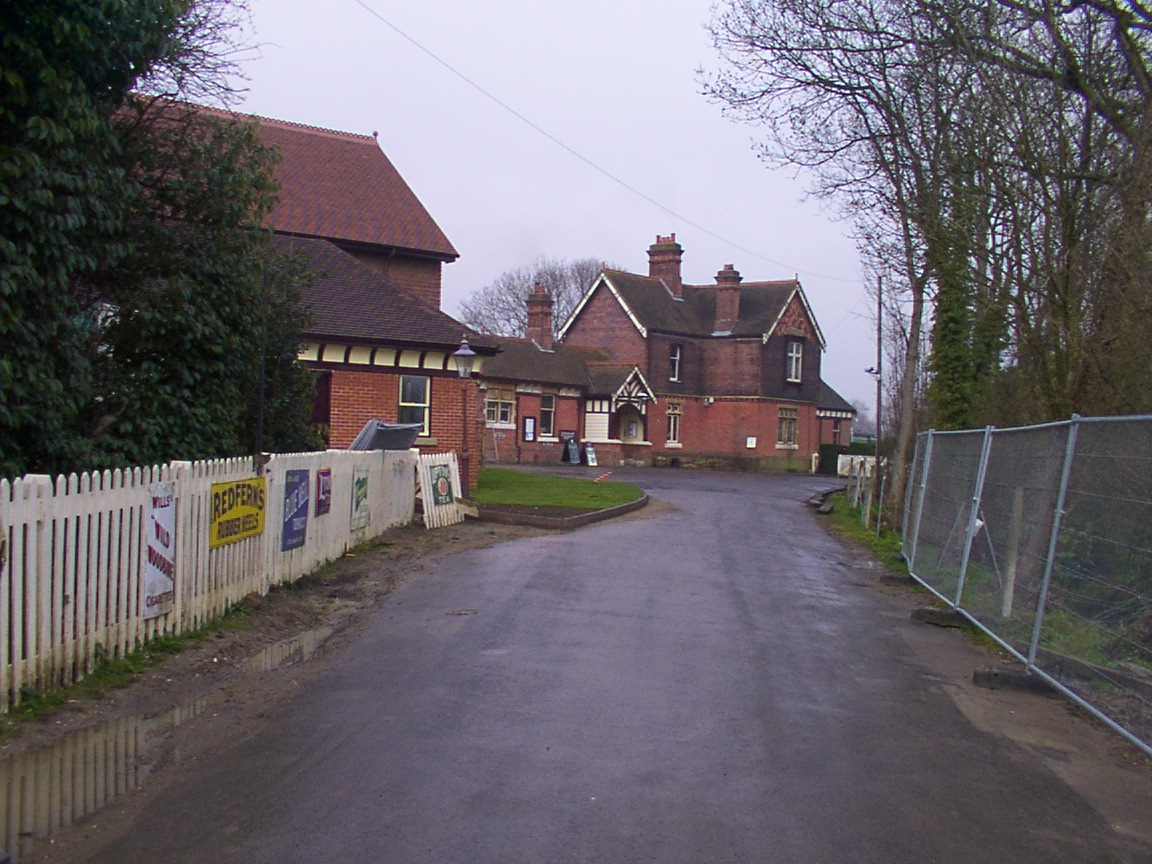
The station entrance, coming up from the car park

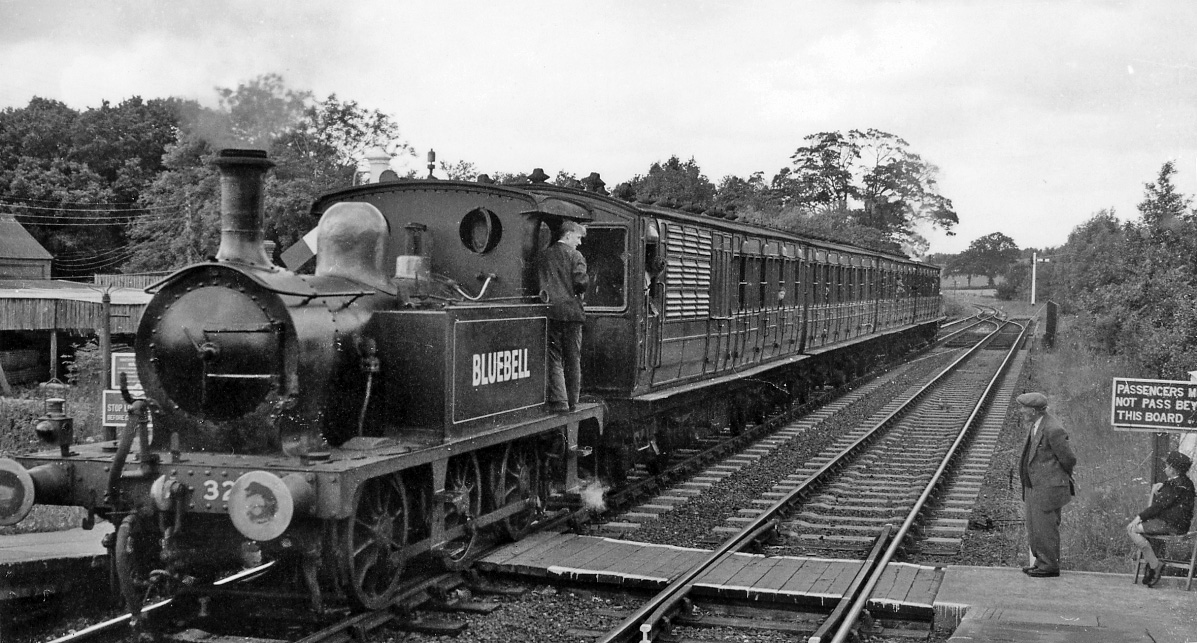
Ex-SE&C Wainwright class P 0-6-0T No. 323 in 1961

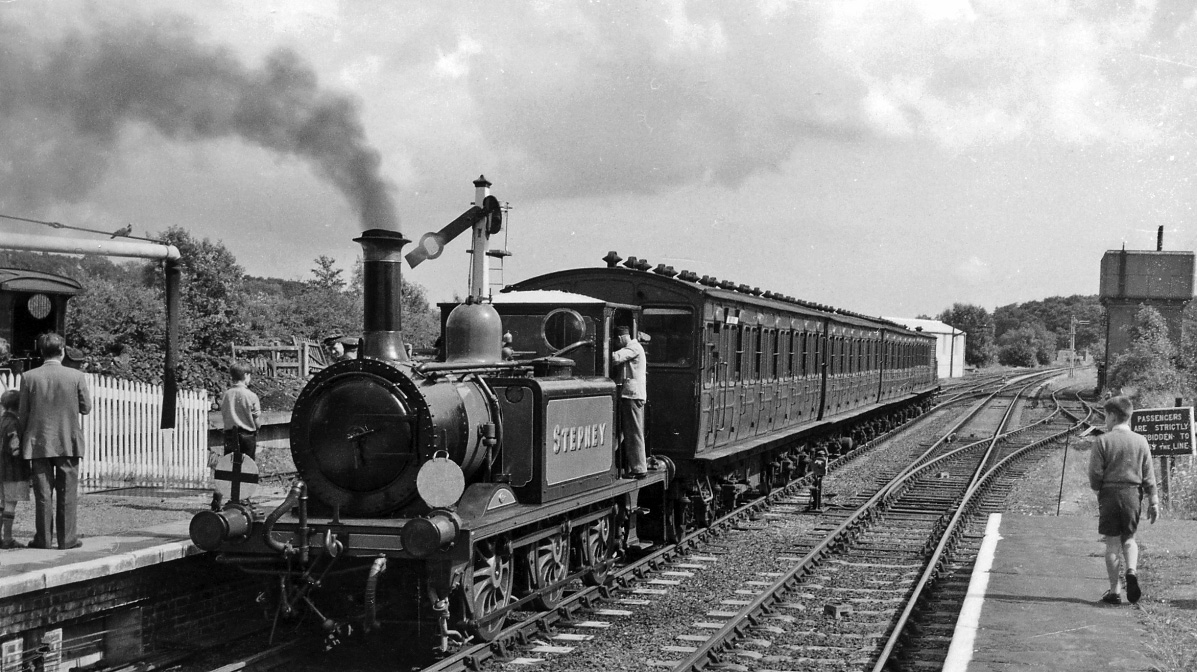
Ex-LB&SC A1X class No. 55 'Stepney' in 1961
