= Withyham railway station =

Former railway station in England

Coordinates: 51.1076°N 0.1402°E

Withyham
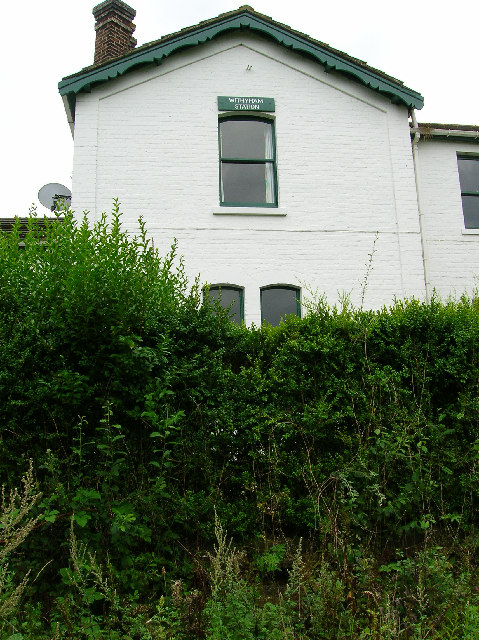

General information
- Location: Withyham, Wealden; England
- Grid reference: TQ499364
- Platforms: 1

Other information
- Status: Disused

History
- Pre-grouping: London, Brighton and South Coast Railway
- Post-grouping: Southern Railway; Southern Region of British Railways

Key dates
- 1 October 1866: Station opened
- 2 January 1967: Station closed
Location

Withyham was a railway station on the Three Bridges to Tunbridge Wells Central Line which closed in 1967, a casualty of the Beeching Axe. The station opened on 1 October 1866 and the buildings were designed by Charles Henry Driver. The station building survived the closure and is now a private residence named the "Old Withyham Station"; much of the trackbed as far as Groombridge and Three Bridges are part of the Worth Way and Forest Way cyclepath/footpaths.

Preceding station	Disused railways	Following station
Hartfield	British Rail; Southern Region; Three Bridges to Tunbridge Wells Central Line	Eridge
Hartfield	British Rail; Southern Region; Three Bridges to Tunbridge Wells Central Line	Groombridge

== History (Staff) ==
The staff employed at Withyham Station were all appointed on 29 August 1866. They were Mr William Fox, Station Master (previously Station Master, Epsom Downs); William Bell, Assistant Telegraph and Booking Clerk (previously Trainee Signal Clerk at Brighton); Joseph Moore, Porter (previously a Gatekeeper at Lewes) and Charles Farr was the Gatekeeper and Signalman. This later individual had a chequered career having previously been employed as Signalman at Haywards Heath but having been found asleep on duty was reduced in grade and transferred to Hailsham.

William Bell was to remain at Withyham until his death on 24 September 1872 when Henry Payne took over at Station Master. He was to remain until his retirement on 20 May 1889. William Kent then became Station Master on transfer from Barcombe on 21 May 1889. He remained until he went to Barcombe Mills on 26 Jan 1894. His replacement was George Brook; his staff record shows he was moved from Barcombe Mills to Withyham due to "General Neglect". He clearly failed to heed the message of his superiors because he was removed to Brighton as a Clerk on 10 April 1897 due to "Incompetency". His place was taken by Francis W Baker, appointed as Station Master on 5 April 1897 moving to Falmer on 17 May 1899. Next Edward Vickery, Booking Clerk at Haywards Heath gained promotion as Station Master arriving on 17 May 1899 and leaving to take up the same post at Rotherfield on 24 May 1901. George Crittenden, Booking Clerk at Worthing was the next SM arriving on 24 May 1901.

== Reopening ==
With regard to the possible reopening of the remaining section of the line from Groombridge to Three Bridges, a number of physical obstacles would appear to stand in the way of such action, most notably:

1) A bridge over the B2210 near Ashurst Junction has been removed and the embankment cut back.

2) An industrial site currently occupies the former location of Forest Row railway station as well as a small recycling centre to the west.

3) At Forest Row a bridge over the A22 has been removed and the embankment cut back.

4) The formation has been built across in several places notably in East Grinstead where about one mile of the trackbed from Station Road to the Lewes Road tunnel has been taken over for a relief road (the A22 ironically named Beeching Way after local resident Richard Beeching whose recommendations closed the railway line). As there is no feasible alternative route into the station, this road would need to be reconverted back to rail. Any such action would in all likelihood result in a cut in capacity on an already highly congested road network.

5) The site of Grange Road has disappeared under a small parade of shops as well as housing which block 0.64 miles of the formation.

6) The M23 cuts across the trackbed between Three Bridges and Grange Road

== Signal Box ==
The signalbox that controlled the gates at the level crossing at the western end of the station is now preserved at Sheffield Park station on the Bluebell Railway as part of the new museum.

== Gallery ==
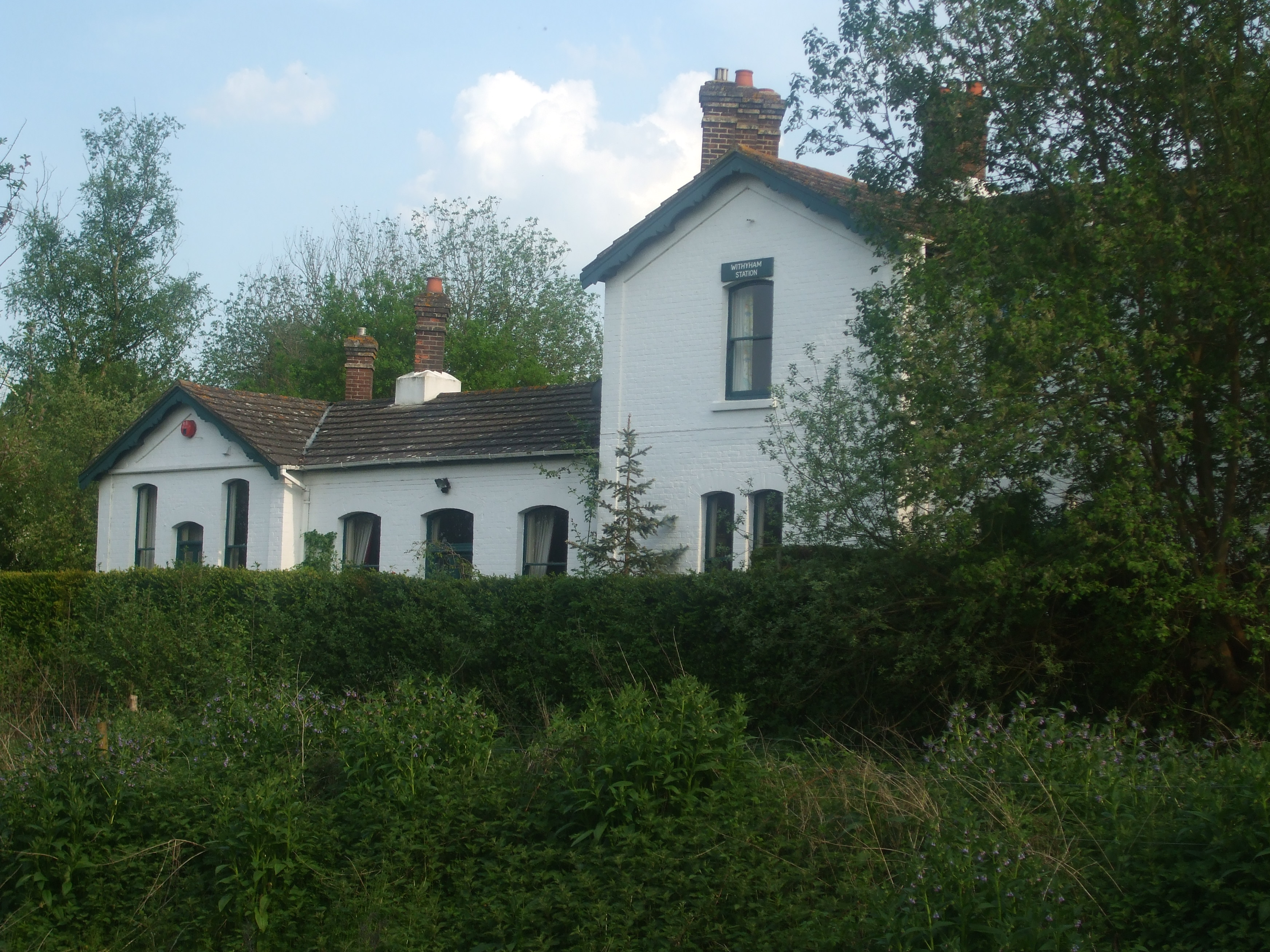
Rear of station as seen from Forest Way

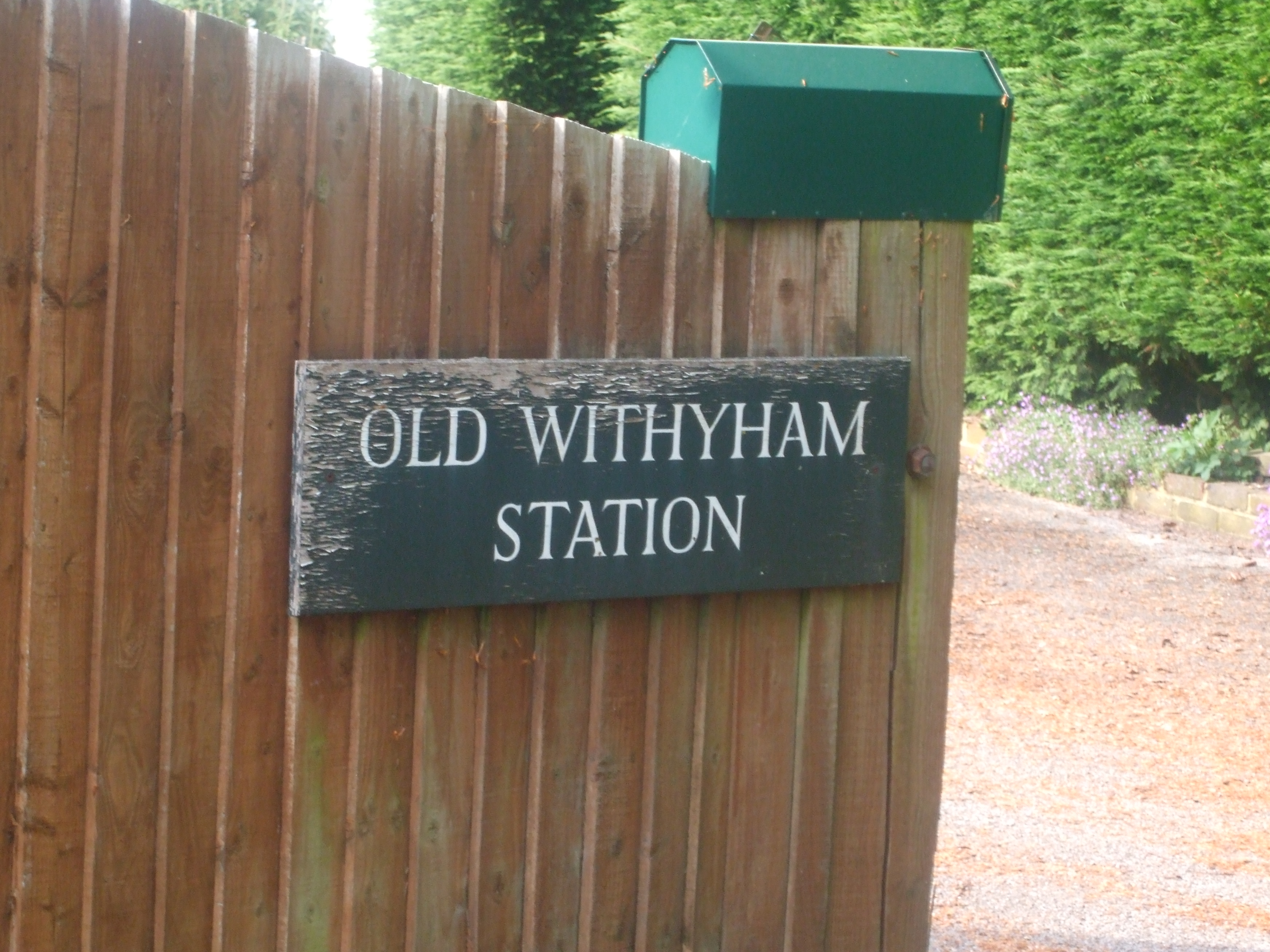
"Old Withyham Station" board

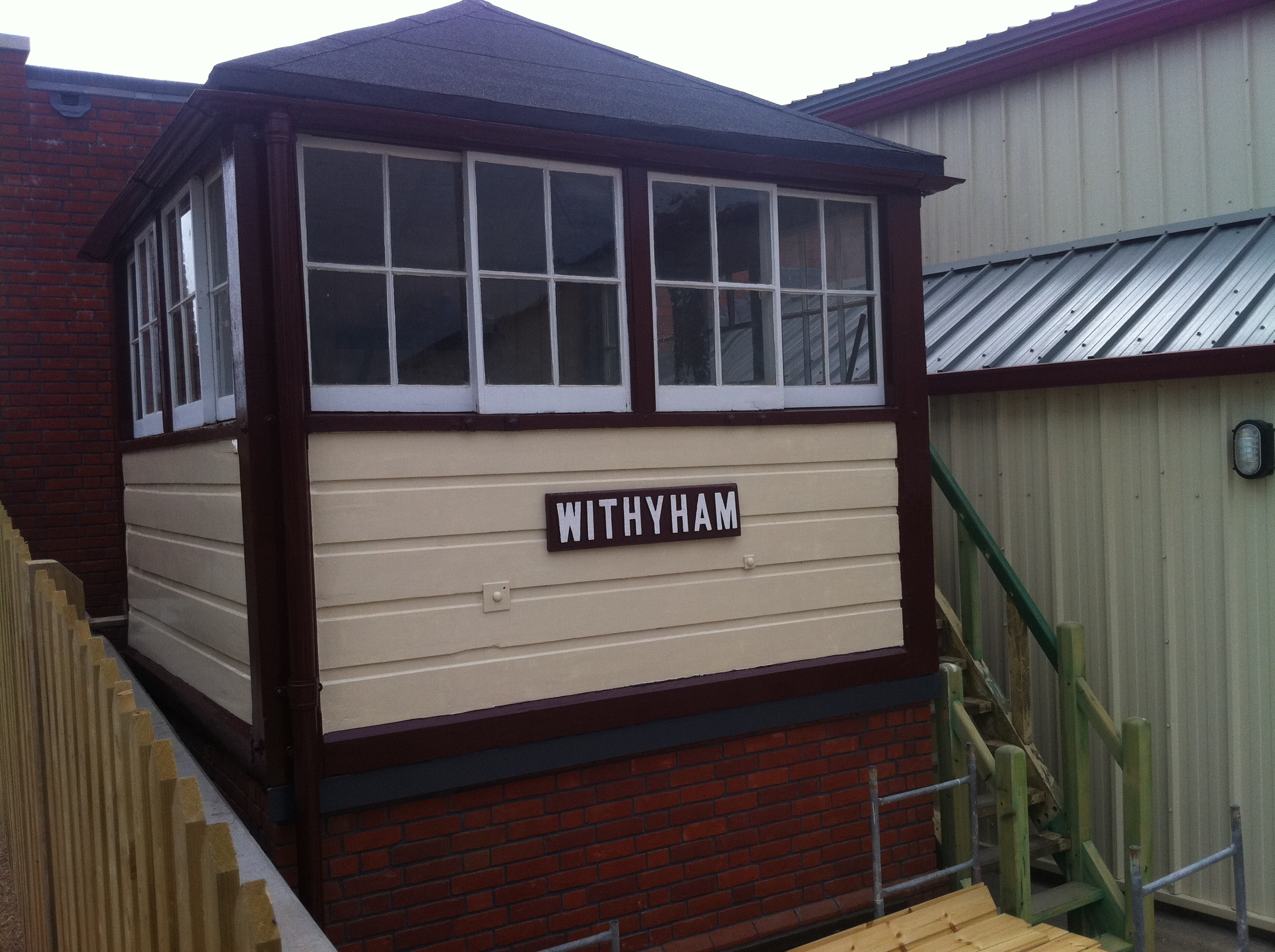
Withyham signal box at its new location at Sheffield Park railway station, Bluebell Railway.

== See also ==
- List of closed railway stations in Britain
