= Groombridge =

Village on East Sussex/Kent border, England

Coordinates: 51.112°N 0.185°E

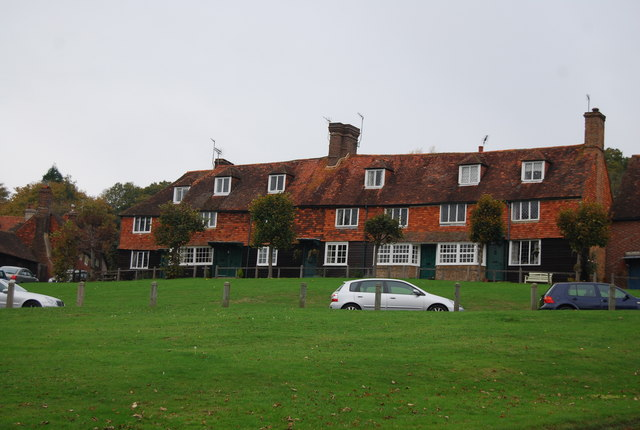
- Cottages on the green

- Location within East Sussex
- OS grid reference: TQ530374
- District: Wealden; Tunbridge Wells
- Shire county: East Sussex; Kent
- Region: South East
- Country: England
- Sovereign state: United Kingdom
- Post town: Tunbridge Wells
- Postcode district: TN3
- Dialling code: 01892
- Police: Sussex
- Fire: East Sussex
- Ambulance: South East Coast
- UK Parliament: Tunbridge Wells; Wealden

Groombridge is a village of about 1,600 people. It straddles the border between Kent and East Sussex, in England. The nearest large town is Royal Tunbridge Wells, about 4.5 miles (7.2 km) away by road.

The main part of the village ("New Groombridge") lies in the Withyham civil parish, which forms part of Wealden District of East Sussex. Across the county boundary lies the much smaller and older part of the village ("Old Groombridge"). This is within the Speldhurst civil parish, which forms part of the Tunbridge Wells Borough of Kent. At the 2011 Census the population of the Kent portion of the village was included in the civil parish of Frant.

New Groombridge has a primary school associated with the church of St Thomas, part of the Diocese of Chichester. It has a general store, a bakery, a post office, a hairdresser, a car dealership and the Junction Inn public house. The railway station is also in the East Sussex part of Groombridge.

Old Groombridge has the church of St John, which is part of the Diocese of Rochester. It also has the Crown Inn public house and the "Blooming Perfect" florist. The village hit the headlines in November 2020 due to East Sussex and Kent going into different Coronavirus tiers. With East Sussex being in Tier 2, the Junction could open and serve alcohol with a substantial meal, but, with Kent in Tier 3, the Crown Inn was forced to remain closed.

== History ==
Groombridge Place is a popular visitor attraction, with a history beginning in 1239. Groombridge Place has been owned by some of Kent's most distinguished families, including the de Cobhams and Sir Richard Waller.

The first reference we have is from Saxon times, when there was a settlement on the north bank, the Kent side, of the stream which is now called The Grom. The head of the tribe was Groman and it was his responsibility to keep the bridge across the stream to ensure no unwanted types from the South got across. So it became known as Gromensbregge, which became corrupted over the years to Groombridge.

MacKinnnon's History of Speldhurst records that Groman built a castle within a moat and that the Normans later destroyed it after the conquest.

The next firm evidence is of two Royal Charters. One was granted in 1239 to William Russell and his wife to build a Chantry Chapel to their house at Gromenbregge, endowed with a Priest. This chapel was dedicated to St John the Evangelist. This indicates another house had been built on the site of the Saxon one. The second Royal Charter, granted to Henry de Gobham in 1286, was to hold a weekly market and a fair once a year on the eve, day and morrow of the feast of St John before the Latin Gate, which translates into 5, 6 and 7 May each year. Groombridge must have been important in the area to have been granted a market. Originally it was held on and around the Green but in Victorian times it moved over the stream to a site in Withyham Road opposite the garage and became a fortnightly cattle market until the 1950s when it closed for good. The fair had died out much earlier in the 1900s. According to legend the finale of each Fair was the rolling of a blazing tar barrel down the hill.

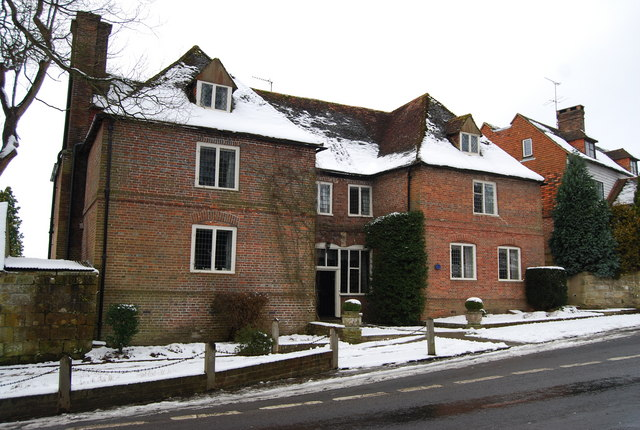
Manor House

The Waller family bought the Manor in 1360 and owned it for about 240 years. In 1604 the estate was sold to Thomas 1st Earl of Dorset. He owned the Buckhurst estate at Withyham and his land, including Pollies Hall, run up to the stream on the Sussex side. In 1610, for Pollies Hall Nicholas Pennyale paid £10 and 2 fat capon alive each year on 1 November.

Thomas 1st Earl Dorset died suddenly in 1608 and his grandson Richard 3rd Earl inherited the manor. Richard was profligate and by 1618 he had sold the manor to John Packer. It may have been that sale that brought the lands on the Sussex side, closer to the river, into the manor. Certainly at some time they became part of the estate and some still belong to Groombridge Place today.

The new owner, John Packer, was a wealthy man, owner of 3 other manors, and a Clerk to the Privy Seal. He would have been familiar with the intrigues of the day and made it clear he did not approve of Prince Charles' somewhat harebrained scheme, encouraged by his father James 1, to go to Spain, in disguise in 1623, in an attempt to woo and wed the Spanish Infanta. John Packer said if Charles failed he would build a chapel on his land at Groombridge as a thank-offering to God for escaping a union with a Catholic country. Charles' plan did fail because the Princess had entered a convent and refused to have anything to do with him. True to his word John Packer built his chapel in 1625. At first it was known as St. Charles' chapel then Groombridge chapel and finally, after 1872, it was dedicated to St John the Evangelist.

== Burrswood ==
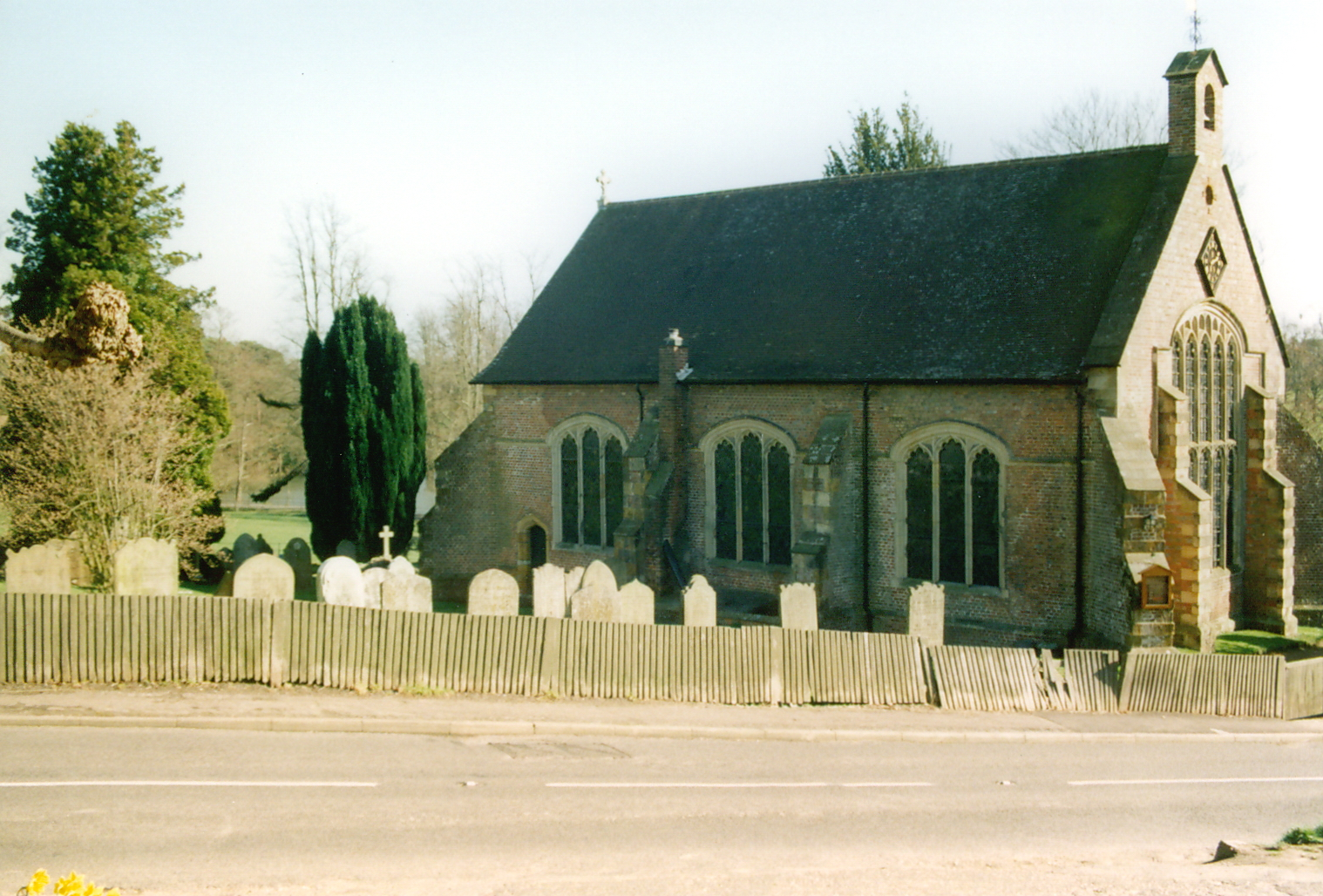
Church at Groombridge

Burrswood Health and Wellbeing, situated on land that was once part of the Groombridge Place, was operated as an independent non-surgical hospital, "treating the whole person in a Christian environment". Specialities included palliative and respite care, post-surgical care, rehabilitation, counselling, hydrotherapy and physiotherapy. Burrswood was founded in 1948 when Dorothy Kerin established her healing ministry and was run as a charity, The Dorothy Kerin Trust, also providing healing services, guest house, tea room, gift shop and Christian book shop on the site. In 2016 the trust announced the closure of the hospital however it continued to operate until April 2019 when it closed without advance notice, the charity ceased operations and went into administration and, according to the BBC the staff were not paid their final wages.

== Railway ==
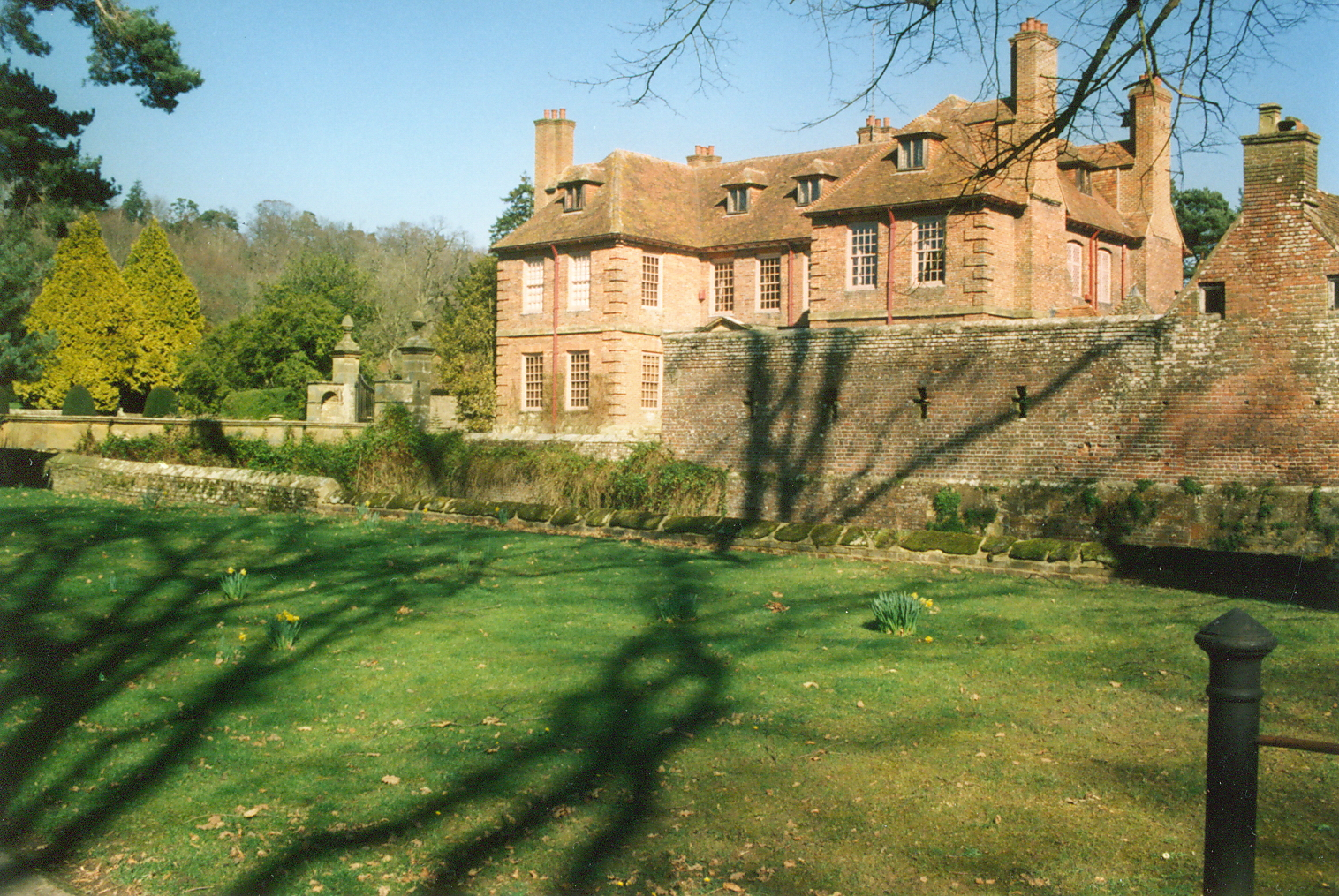
The oldest house in Groombridge

Groombridge stood on the Three Bridges to Tunbridge Wells Central Line. Other stations included: Three Bridges, Rowfant, Grange Road, East Grinstead, Forest Row, Withyham, High Rocks, Tunbridge Wells West and Tunbridge Wells Central. The line was operated by the London, Brighton and South Coast Railway, then Southern, and later British Rail. Groombridge station was finally closed on 6 July 1985.

Groombridge is now on the Spa Valley Railway and is at present the southern terminus of that line. The current Groombridge station is on the east side of Station Road, and a joint ticket for the railway and Groombridge Place is available. A canopy has been erected on both sides of the station, using the former canopy supports from Gravesend West station. A brand new signal box has been constructed on the site and signalling is being installed in conjunction with the extension to Eridge which opened in 2013.

In 2014 two rooms in the Old Station were leased from Withyham Parish Council and reopened as the ticket office in April 2014.

== Notable residents ==
- Arthur Moreland (1867-1951), political cartoonist and artist lived here
