= Hartfield =

Village and parish in East Sussex, England

Coordinates: 51°06′07″N 0°06′40″E

- Village and civil parish
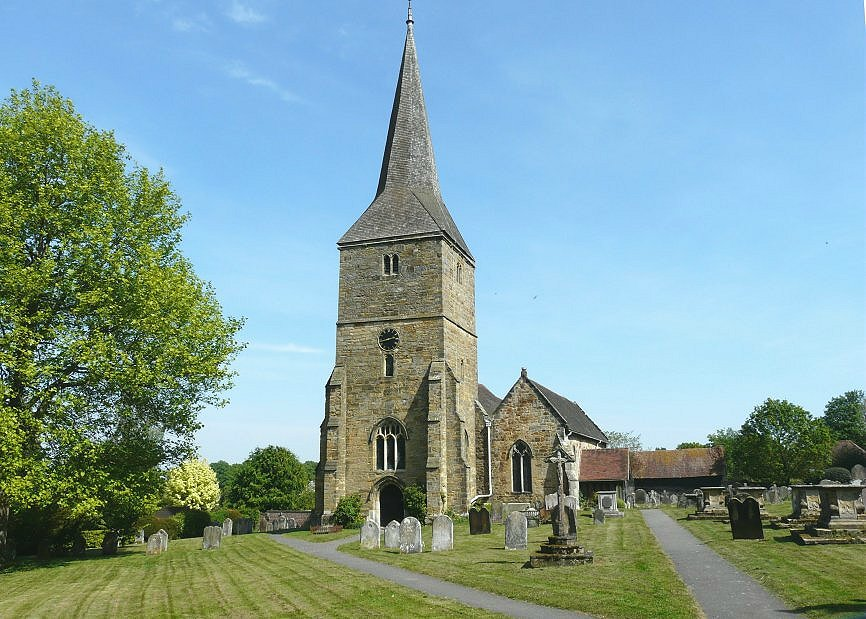
- Hartfield Parish Church

- Location within East Sussex
- Area: 42.0 km^{2} (16.2 sq mi)
- Population: 2,179 (2011)
  - Density: 133/sq mi (51/km^{2})
- OS grid reference: TQ479359
  - London: 29 miles (47 km) NNW
- District: Wealden
- Shire county: East Sussex
- Region: South East
- Country: England
- Sovereign state: United Kingdom
- Post town: HARTFIELD
- Postcode district: TN7
- Dialling code: 01892; 01342
- Police: Sussex
- Fire: East Sussex
- Ambulance: South East Coast
- UK Parliament: Sussex Weald
- Website: Parish Council

Hartfield is a village and civil parish in the Wealden district of East Sussex, England. The parish also includes the settlements of Colemans Hatch, Hammerwood and Holtye, all lying on the northern edge of Ashdown Forest.

== Geography ==
The main village of Hartfield lies seven miles (11.2 km) south-west of Royal Tunbridge Wells where the B2110 road between Groombridge and Forest Row meets the B2026 road between Edenbridge and Maresfield.

== Governance ==
Hartfield Parish Council consists of 13 members. The population of this ward as taken at the 2011 census was 2,639.

== The parish settlements ==
Hartfield is the main village in the parish. It lies on the upper reaches of the River Medway and on the edge of Ashdown Forest. A Roman road from London to Lewes runs across the parish, to the west of the village. According to Domesday Book, Hardfield, in the 'Rape' of Pevensey, had 6 manor houses and a water mill. From the 13th Century up until the time of Queen Elizabeth I, much of the land was in the ownership of the Dukes of Dorset (the Sackville family). The modern village street remains narrow, precluding much parking.

The church is dedicated to St Mary the Virgin.

There were three public houses: the Anchor Inn, the Gallipot Inn and the Haywagon Inn. The Haywagon Inn (originally known as The Dorset Arms) dates to the 16th Century and was closed in 2015 following a planning application to convert to housing.

Popes Cottage is reputedly the oldest building in the village, originally built as a hall house in 1236.

The elder brother of the writer W. Somerset Maugham, Frederic Maugham, 1st Viscount Maugham PC QC, a lawyer and judge who served as Lord Chancellor from March 1938 until September 1939, and his son, the author Robin Maugham, are buried in the churchyard.

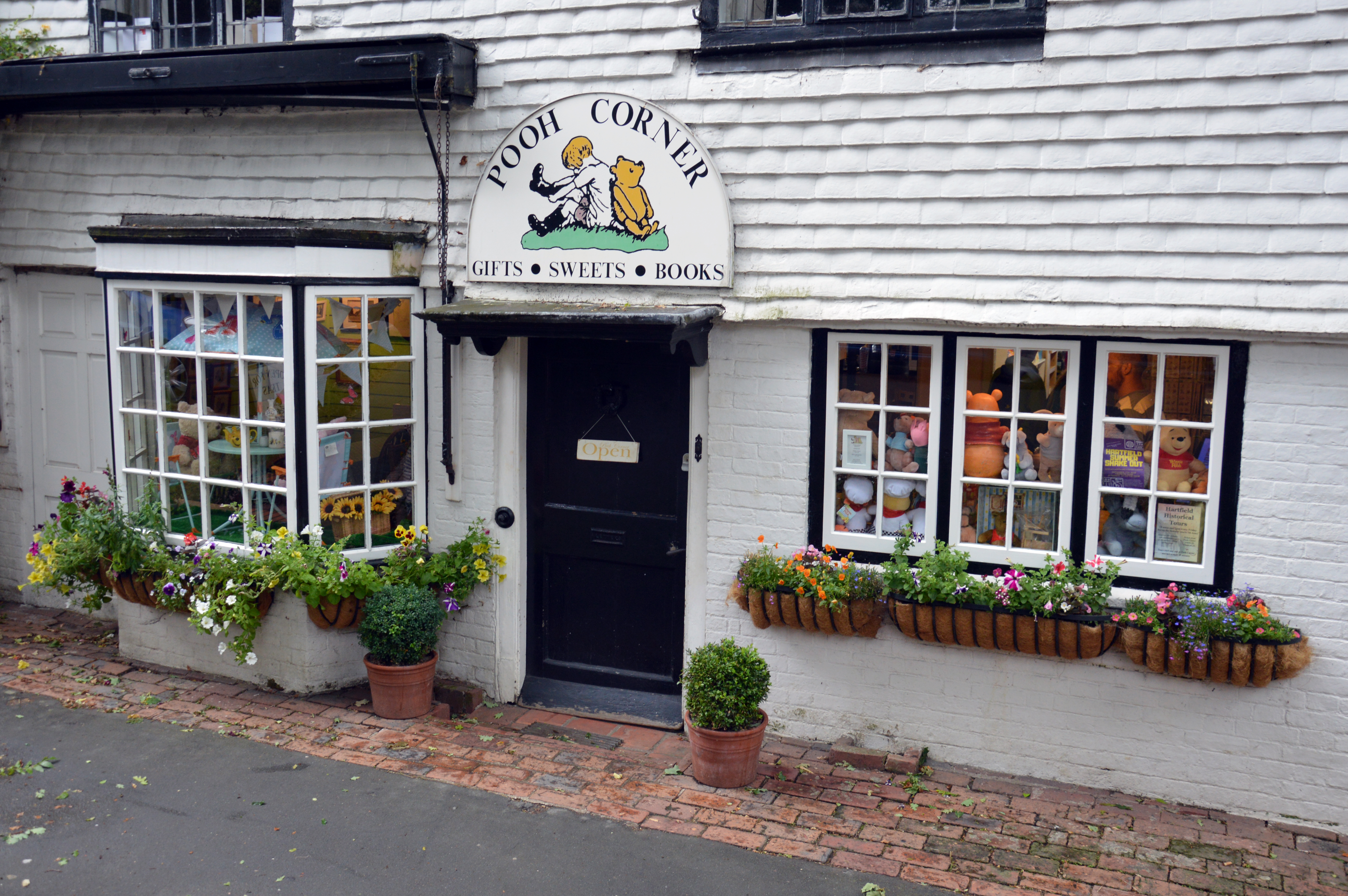
A Winnie the Pooh-themed shop and café in the main village.

Cotchford Farm, Hartfield was the home of A.A. Milne (1882–1956), author of the Winnie the Pooh books, from where many of his books are set; later it was owned by Brian Jones, guitarist and founder of The Rolling Stones who was discovered dead in the pool in 1969. There is a shop in the village dedicated to all things connected with the Winnie the Pooh stories.

Henry VIII was believed to have used Bolebroke Castle, located a short distance from the village, where he hunted wild boar and deer at the nearby Ashdown Forest. He also was believed to have courted Anne Boleyn from this castle.

Hartfield had a railway station on the Three Bridges to Tunbridge Wells Central Line until it was closed in 1967. Most of the former trackbed is now part of the Forest Way, forms part of National Cycle Route 21, and is much used by walkers and cyclists. The station building itself is now used as a pre-school. There is a bus service that connects the village with Crawley, East Grinstead and Tunbridge Wells.

There are a number of businesses in the village.

=== Colemans Hatch ===
The hamlet of Colemans Hatch lies to the south-west of Hartfield. It is a scattered settlement around a series of road junctions. The church here is dedicated to the Holy Trinity and is part of the joint benefice with St Mary's Hartfield. The Hatch Inn is located here.

The imposing South Hartfield House was the residence of General Sir Reginald Hildyard, who died there in 1965.

=== Hammerwood ===
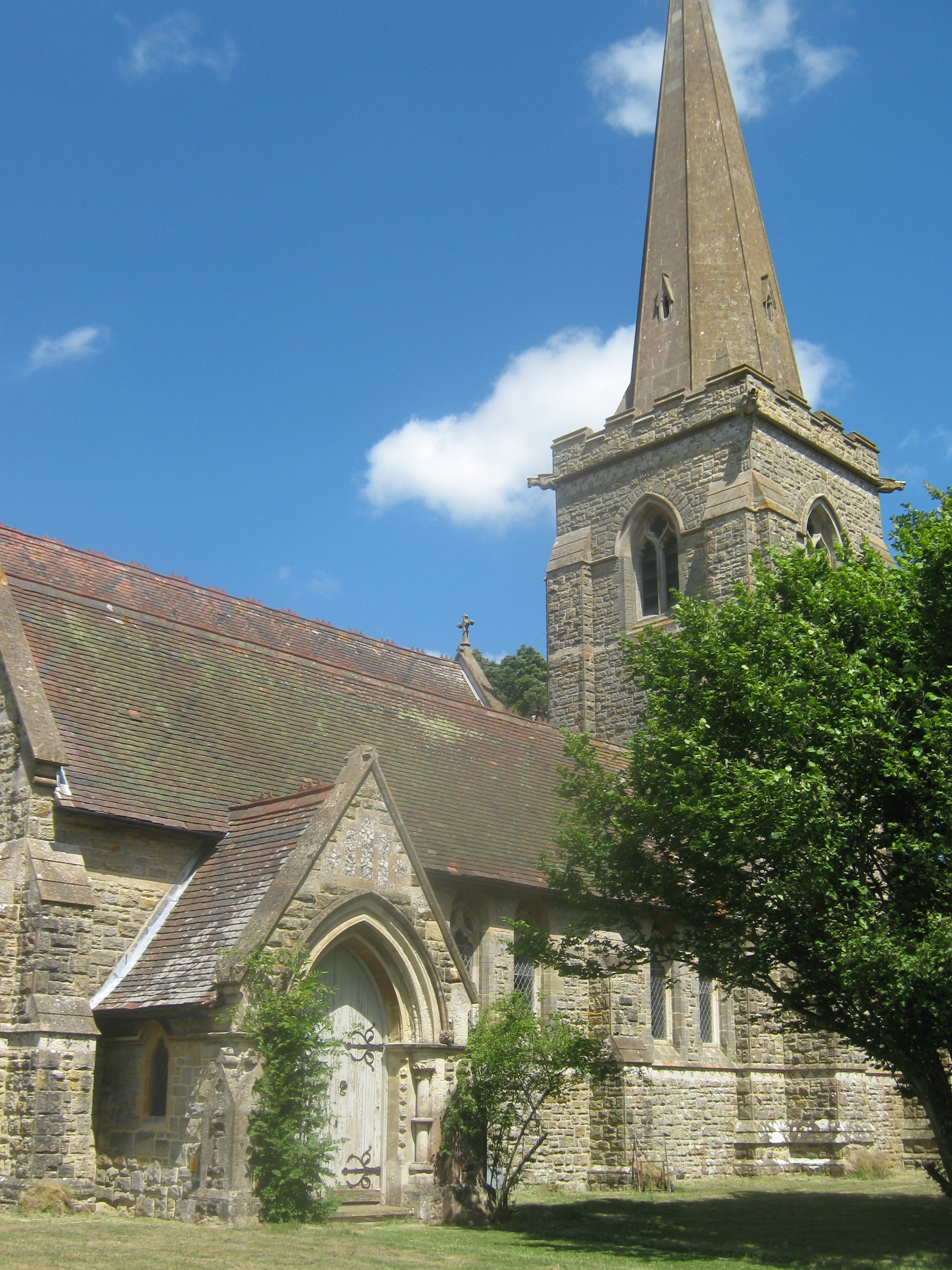
St. Stephen's Church

The name Hammerwood comes from the Wealden iron industry and relates to the numerous hammer-ponds found in the area. Streams in the locality can still run red with the colour of iron in the water. A hammer-pond is a water reservoir created specifically for providing power to water-powered hammers, forges or blast furnaces. There were many Medway watermills in the area.

Aside from a number of houses, the most notable buildings are St Stephen's Church and Hammerwood Park at the end of the lane, which was the centre of what was a large country estate extending in its heyday to over 2,500 acres (1,000 ha).

The church was completed in 1880 funded by local landowner Oswald Augustus Smith and built to a design of E.P. Loftus Brock. Smith also funded the rebuilding of St Peter's Church in Holtye within the same parish. The church can be found on the main road. Inside the church is a pipe organ built by T.C. Lewis of Brixton in 1884.

There is a Scout campsite at Hammerwood owned and operated by the Lewisham North District Scouts.

==== Hammerwood Park ====
Hammerwood Park is a country house south of the village: it is a Grade I listed building. Built in 1792, it was the first work of the architect Benjamin Latrobe, who was also responsible for the United States Capitol in Washington, D.C.

It was purchased by the rock band Led Zeppelin in 1973, but not properly maintained by them. Left almost derelict, it was then bought in 1982 and restoration began: that restoration was award-winning and received a lot of television coverage. The house is often used for filming, and is open to the public in the summer: concerts are often held there.

=== Holtye ===
Holtye is immediately north-east of Hammerwood. Here the public house, The White Horse Inn, closed in 2014; the church is dedicated to St Peter, although the church is now redundant.

=== Marsh Green ===
Marsh Green is a group of buildings near Colemans Hatch. The region has been mentioned in census records since 1841. Marsh Green is close to the Poohsticks Bridge, and visitors missing the turning can find themselves there.

=== Newbridge ===
A small settlement most notable for the remains of the earliest blast furnace in England. Founded in about 1496, the furnace was last referred to in 1603. It was probably constructed on the site of an earlier bloomery. Also in the hamlet is an 18th-century corn mill and mill house, both are Grade II listed.

== Landmarks ==
Ashdown Forest falls partly within the parish. This Site of Special Scientific Interest is a large area of common ground comprising area of semi-natural woodland, heath and bog.

St Mary's Church is another notable landmark in Hartfield. The oldest part of the current church building, the nave, is dated to the thirteenth century, to which the south aisle and tower were added in the fourteenth century. In the fifteenth century, the shingled spire was added to the tower. In the nineteenth century, extensive repairs were made to the roof and many of the present furnishings in the church were added.

== Demography ==
In the 2001 census return, there were 2,105 people in the parish. Age breakdown is approximately as follows: 0–15: 28%; 16–59: 49%; 60+ : 23%. There were 1,640 registered voters in 1998. The average values of houses in 2001 for Hartfield parish for all property types was £286,736.
