= Worth Way =

Footpath in West Sussex, England

Coordinates: 51°7′N 0°5′W

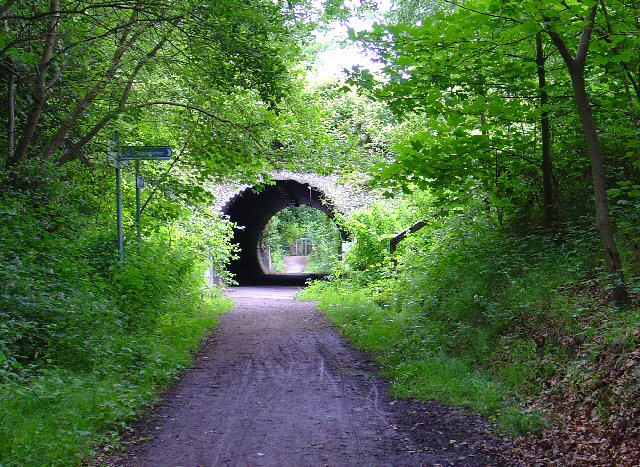
- Length: 7 mi (11 km)
- Location: West Sussex, England
- Trailheads: Three Bridges - East Grinstead
- Use: Hiking, cycling, horseriding

The Worth Way is a 7-mile (11 km) footpath and bridleway linking the West Sussex towns of Crawley and East Grinstead via the village of Crawley Down. Mostly following the trackbed of a disused railway the path is an important wildlife corridor. It is part of the National Cycle Network.

== History ==
The Worth Way follows for much of its route part of the course of a dismantled railway - the Three Bridges to Tunbridge Wells Central Line - which opened in 1855 and closed in 1967 as a result of the programme of closures put forward by East Grinstead resident and British Transport Commission Chairman, Richard Beeching. By 1977 West Sussex County Council had purchased almost four miles (6.4 km) of the line, mostly in the parish of Worth. On 10 July 1979 much of the route was officially reopened as footpath and bridleway.

The reopening came, however, too late for two sections of the route which had already been lost to development by 1979. Firstly, a small commercial and residential development was built over the site of the former Grange Road railway station in Crawley Down, which includes an Off-licence. Secondly the trackbed leading eastwards from there has been built on. To avoid this, for a distance of approximately 1,000 m, the Worth Way travels over local roads within a housing estate from just east of B2028 Turners Hill (which bridges over Worth Way) Road to Cobb Close where it rejoins the former railway bed alignment. A final minor diversion occurs near Rowfant railway station (still standing) where the former goods yard is in industrial use and the route briefly diverts to the road. At Compasses Corner (formerly Compasses Crossing level crossing) on Wallage Lane the trackbed as far as the M23 has been reused as a landfill site, the original railway alignment being marked by a line of trees. Here the Worth Way continues along Turners Hill Road for 150 m before turning off to join a bridleway which passes through a farm to reach a bridge over the M23 which leads into the urban sprawl of Worth, now a suburb of Crawley, following local roads to rejoin the railway alignment near Church Road.

== National Cycle Network ==
In summer 1999 the trail was resurfaced using a combination of natural materials to enable it to become part of the Sustrans National Cycle Network. Lasting eight weeks, the work was carried out by contractors Edburtons who laid a 2.5 m wide path which would accommodate walkers, cyclists and horseriders. The works cost £300,000 and were jointly funded by West Sussex County Council, Mid Sussex County Council and the National Lottery Millennium Fund; the telecommunications company Eurobell ( Virgin Media) also contributed funds in return for the right to lay cables under the path. The works coincided with the completion of final section of the Worth Way between Station Hill near Three Bridges station, as well as a new link with another trail, the Forest Way, at Herontye Drive in East Grinstead which follows the remaining section of the Three Bridges to Tunbridge Wells Central Line as far as Groombridge.

Both the Worth Way and the Forest Way, together with a third disused railway footpath - the Cuckoo Trail, form part of Route 21 of the National Cycle Network linking London, Reigate and Gatwick Airport with East Grinstead, Heathfield and Eastbourne.

Google Maps incorrectly labels sections of Route 21 outside West Sussex as the "Worth Way".

== Flora and fauna ==
Officially designated a Site of Nature Conservation Importance in an Area of Outstanding Natural Beauty, much of the Worth Way forms an important wildlife corridor supporting a wide variety of fauna and flora. The former railway cuttings and embankments have been progressively colonised by trees, notably silver birch, ash, hazel and sallow, which have developed into mature woodland. In addition, in areas where chalk was used in the construction of the railway line, chalk-loving plants such as guelder rose, common spotted orchid, twayblade and wild strawberry have flourished. The trees and plants attract in turn a variety of wildlife, including over two hundred species of insect which feed on the sallow. Butterflies are also common, with brimstones in spring, the white admiral and speckled wood from June followed by meadow brown, ringlet and skippers in high summer.

The Worth Way habitat is also home to a variety of birds, mammals and reptiles. Nuthatch and chiffchaff are often spotted in the trees, whilst the kingfisher has been seen at Crawley Down Pond. Adders, grass snakes and the common lizard bask in sunny glades along the old railway line, and the adjoining farmland provides a habitat for roe deer and foxes. Bats can sometimes be spotted near dusk.

The trail is managed by two local authorities - Crawley Borough Council (in respect of the section from Three Bridges to the M23 and West Sussex County Council (the remainder of the route). The sympathetic management of the route seeks to maintain a mosaic of differently-aged trees and shrubs whilst retaining the open areas; this is achieved by coppicing in rotation - cutting trees and shrubs back to their base - to benefit plants such as primrose and insects. The subsequent regrowth then provides nesting sites for birds. Open areas are regularly cut, preventing scrub from encroaching and encouraging species which thrive on open conditions. Ditches along the way keep the path dry and are important to wildlife. The Crawley Down Pond is managed by a local environmental group which initially began in 1999 with three or four members of the public collecting litter; it has now grown into a more substantial and organised collective which meets every third Sunday of the month (weather permitting) between September and May. Recent activities have included the installation of a new bank to prevent flooding.

Litter picks along the length of the Worth Way have been organised annually by Crawley Borough Council as part of their Let's FACE it campaign to clear fly-tipping and refuse dumped along the trail.

== Development threat ==
In 2006 Mid-Sussex District Council floated the idea of constructing a 62-foot (19 m) wide concrete tunnel under the Worth Way which would carry a relief road for East Grinstead over the line of the trail. The tunnel, which would be built using the destructive cut-and-cover method, would form a two lane single carriageway, requiring a 3/4-mile (1.2 km) section of the Way between Imberhorne Lane and East Grinstead station car park to be converted into an A road linking with the A22 Beeching Way. The Worth Way Action Group was set up to fight the proposals and it achieved its goal in March 2007 when the scheme was dropped on the basis that its estimated costs of £157 million (representing £60,000 per East Grinstead dwelling) made it unviable.
