= Grange Road =

Grange Road may be:

- Grange Road, Cambridge, England
- Grange Road railway station, a former railway station in Tunbridge Wells, England
- Grange Road, Adelaide, Australia
- Grange Road, Singapore

== See also ==
- La Grange Road, Chicago, United States
- La Grange Road (Metra), Amtrak station, Chicago, USA
