= Colas Ltd =

UK-based service provider

- Company type: Private Company
- Industry: Civil Engineering
- Headquarters: Rowfant, West Sussex; United Kingdom; 23 offices nationwide
- Key people: Carl Fergusson CEO
- Services: Road construction, Highways maintenance, Airfields construction and maintenance
- Number of employees: 1550 (2020)
- Parent: Colas Group
- Website: www.colas.co.uk

Colas Ltd is a UK-based service provider to the highways and airfield sectors. Services include civil engineering, maintenance and construction and all operations are carried out nationally. Colas Ltd is a subsidiary of the international Colas Group.

== History ==
=== Colas Ltd, the company ===
In 1925 two English companies, Cold Mix Manufacturing Limited and Asphalt Cold Mix Limited formed a new company, Colas Products Limited to supply the bitumen emulsions for use on roads. Between the years of 1934 and 1980 the company went through many changes and by 1980 consisted of two main divisions, the roads division and the building products division. In 1986 the organisation Prismo was acquired and in 1987 changed its name to Colas Holdings.

The name Colas Ltd was first seen in 1992 when Colas Holdings was reorganised and the bitumen road related surface dressing activities and Prismo were transferred to a new subsidiary Colas Ltd. Colas Ltd, became a subsidiary of the international Colas Group in 1985, which is headed by Colas SA in France. The head office for Colas Ltd is located in Rowfant, West Sussex, which has within its grounds the old Rowfant railway station which was part of the East Grinstead Railway.

== Operations ==
Colas Ltd invest, design, manufacture, construct, maintain and operate a wide variety of projects for the public and private sector clients. Services include, civil engineering, maintenance, construction and manufacturing and all operations are carried out nationally and internationally.

== Major projects ==
Projects undertaken by or involving the company have included:

- Managing Agent Contracts, working for the Highways England for Area 12 and 4 (Trunk roads and Motorways), this is in joint venture - Aone+ with Jacobs and Costain .
- Construction Works Framework for Highways England Area 10, 13 and 14
- Traffic Signals Maintenance Contract for Lincolnshire County Council for six years from 1 April 2020
- Highway Construction Works for Manchester City Council including Mancunian Way/ Princess Road, Chorlton Road Cycleway and the innovative CYCLOPS junction, Great Ancoats Street and Stockport Road.
- Birmingham Airport runway extension
- Falkland Islands runway resurfacing
- Kabaale International Airport, Uganda
- Transport for London as part of the LoHAC contract joint venture CVU with AECOM and Volker Highways
- M275 Tipner Project
