= Hartfield railway station =

Former railway station in England

Coordinates: 51.1060°N 0.1122°E

Hartfield
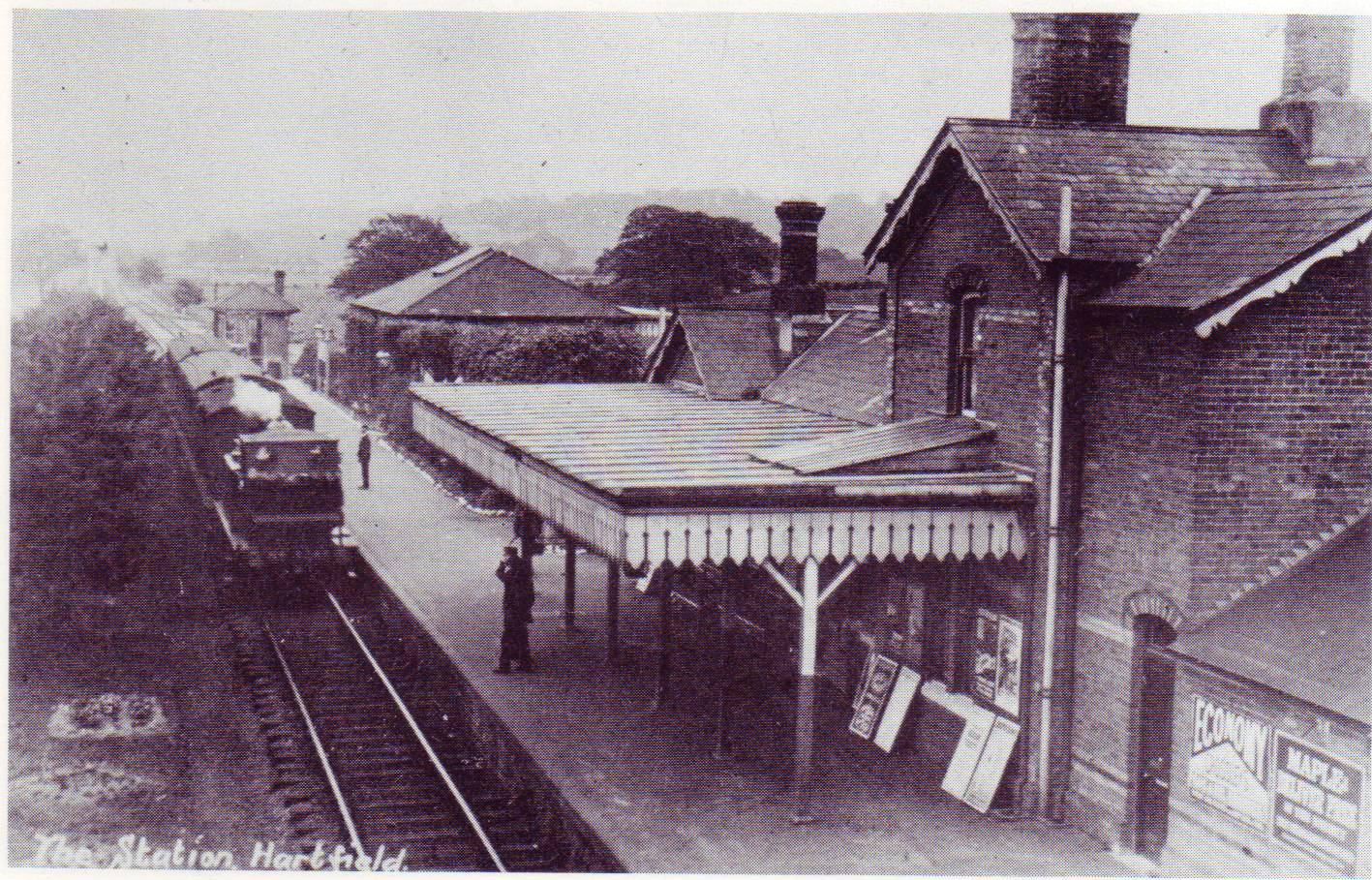

General information
- Location: Hartfield, Wealden, East Sussex; England
- Grid reference: TQ480362
- Platforms: 1

Other information
- Status: Disused

History
- Pre-grouping: London, Brighton and South Coast Railway
- Post-grouping: Southern Railway; Southern Region of British Railways

Key dates
- 1 October 1866: Opened
- 7 May 1962: Closed to goods traffic
- 2 January 1967: Closed to passenger traffic
Location

Hartfield was a railway station serving Hartfield, England, on the Three Bridges to Tunbridge Wells Central Line which closed in 1967, a casualty of the Beeching Axe.

The station opened on 1 October 1866 and the buildings were designed by Charles Henry Driver.

The station building is now divided between a day nursery and a private house. The route of the railway line is now a cycle path (the Forest Way). A.A. Milne, the creator of Winnie-the-Pooh, lived in Hartfield.

The station appears in a British Transport Film entitled Farmer Moving South, which recounted the moving of the entire farm stock of Robert Ropner, by special train from Skutterskelfe Hall in Yorkshire to Perryhill Farm, Hartfield in December 1950. The entire move took 30 hours and was nine hours late in arriving at East Grinstead on 15 December. The film is available on a BFI DVD.

Preceding station	Disused railways	Following station
Forest Row	British Rail; Southern Region; Three Bridges to Tunbridge Wells Central Line	Withyham

== Gallery ==
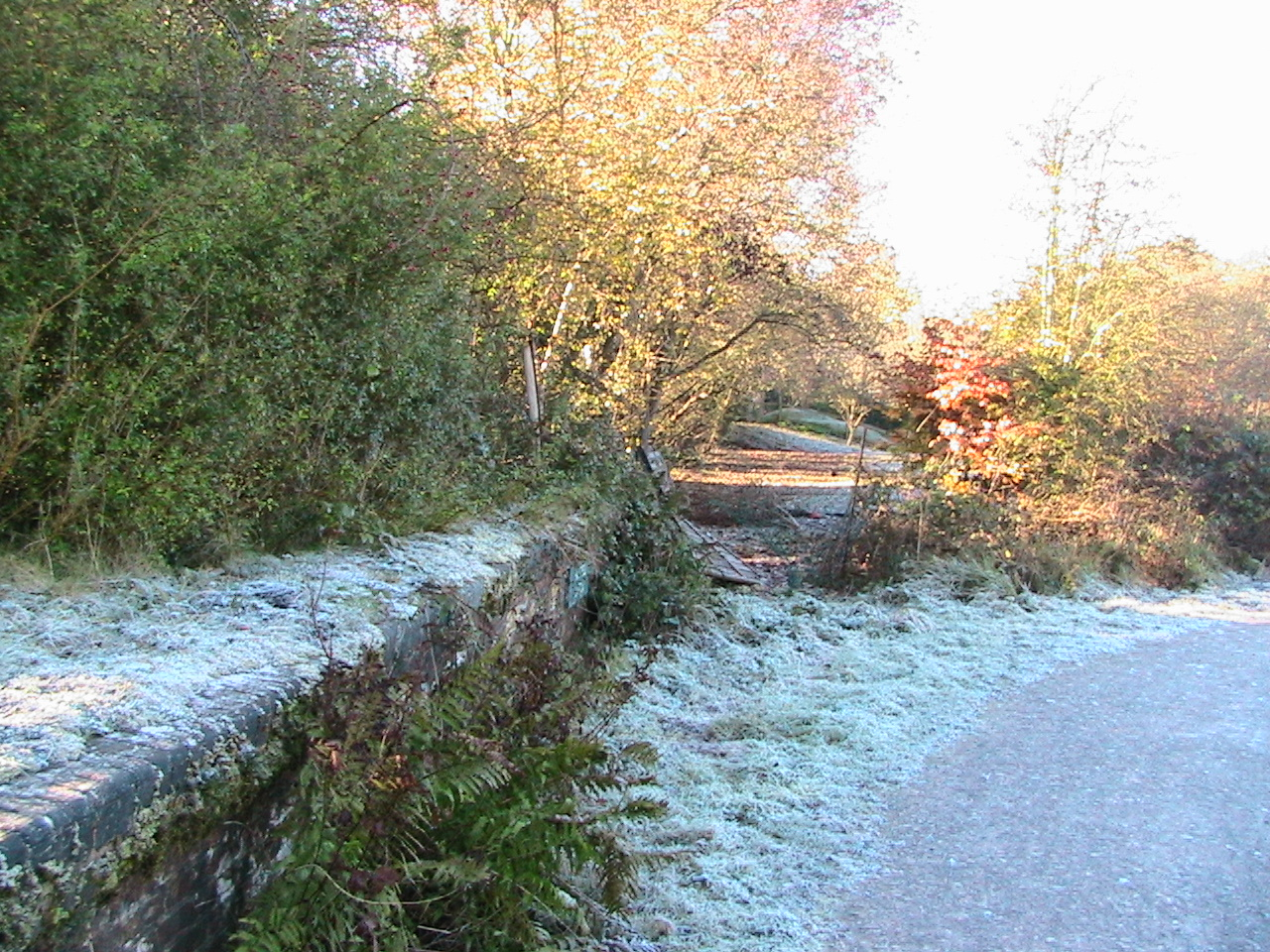
Remains of the platform from the cycle path

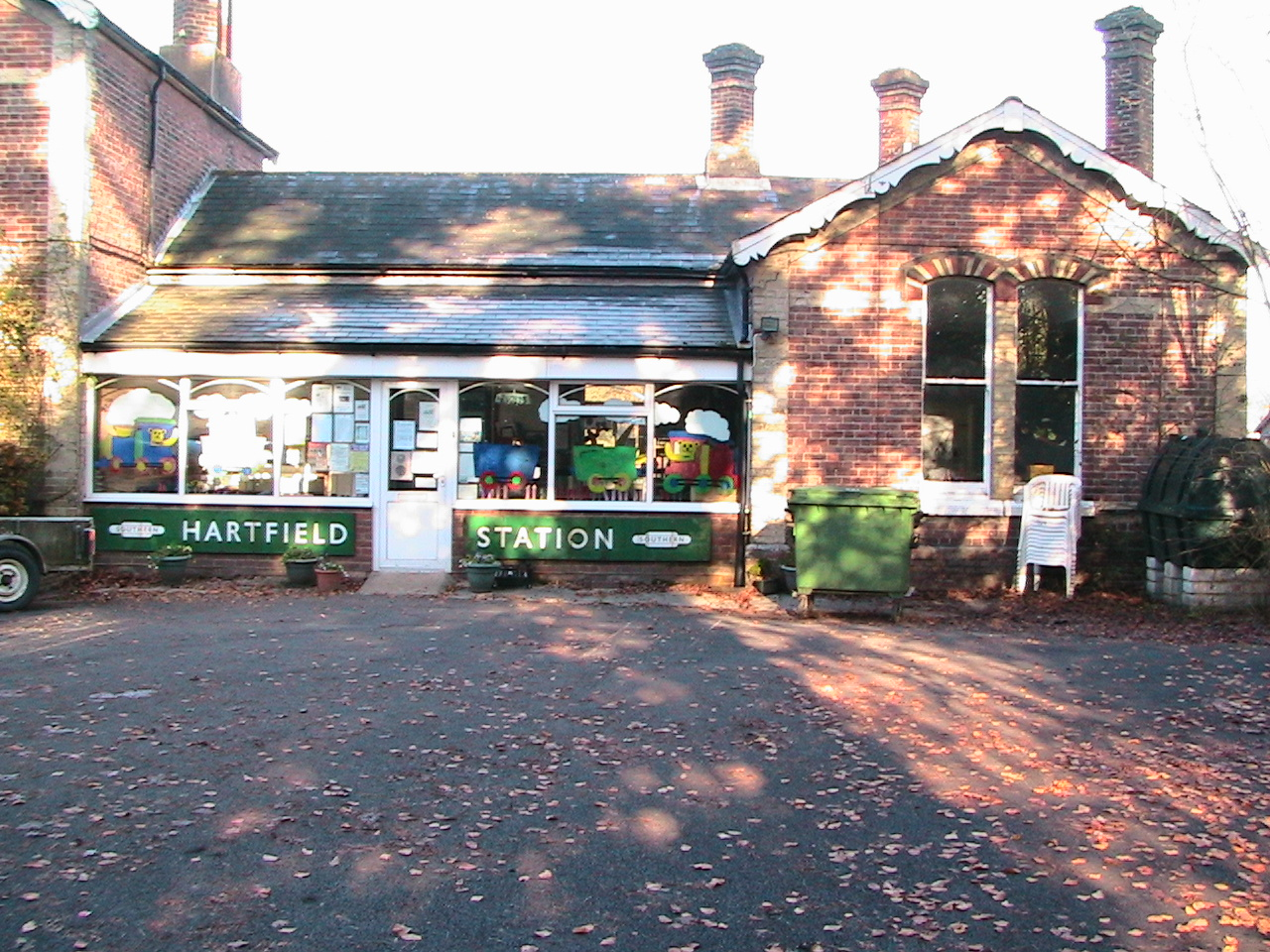
Hartfield station in 2005

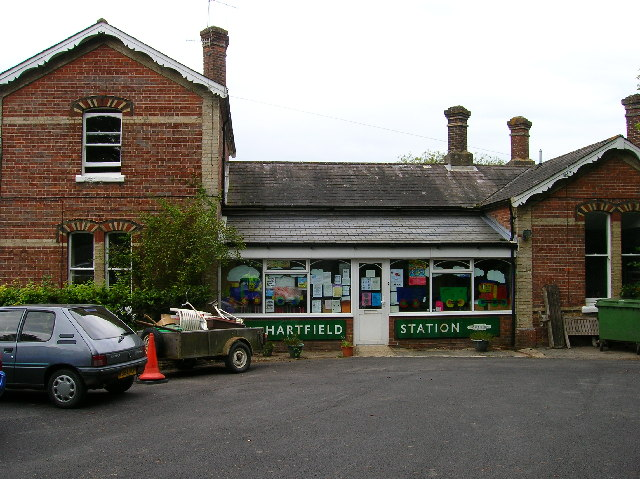
Another view of Hartfield station

== See also ==
- List of closed railway stations in Britain
