= Milborrow Chimney Sweeps =

British chimney sweeps company

Milborrow Chimney Sweeps is a British chimney sweeps company based in Crawley Down, West Sussex.

== History ==
The company has existed for over 100 years. Kevin Giddings purchased the parent company in November 1982 from Cliff Milborrow in Caterham, Surrey. It has expanded to become one of the largest chimney sweeping companies in the United Kingdom. It was granted the Royal Warrant of Appointment by Queen Elizabeth II in November 2002, and a royal warrant by Charles, Prince of Wales, making it one of 180 companies to hold multiple warrants.
