= Rowfant railway station =

Former railway station in England

Coordinates: 51.1152°N 0.1097°W

Rowfant
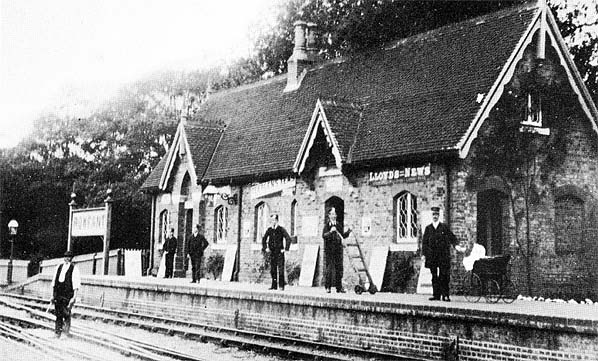
- Rowfant station c1890

General information
- Location: Rowfant, Mid Sussex, West Sussex; England
- Grid reference: TQ325368
- Platforms: 2

Other information
- Status: Disused

History
- Pre-grouping: London, Brighton and South Coast Railway
- Post-grouping: Southern Railway; Southern Region of British Railways

Key dates
- 9 July 1855: Opened
- 7 January 1961: Goods facilities withdrawn
- 2 January 1967: Closed to passenger traffic
Location

Rowfant was a railway station on the Three Bridges to Tunbridge Wells Central Line in the parish of Worth, West Sussex. The line closed in 1967, a casualty of the Beeching Axe. The route of the railway line cut a path through the estate of Curtis Miranda Lampson, a wealthy American fur trader and vice-chairman of the Atlantic Telegraph Company, who agreed to sell his land cheaply to the London, Brighton and South Coast Railway (LBSCR) on condition that a station be provided, together with the right to stop trains on request. Apart from Lampson's Rowfant House the only other nearby residence was Worth Hall owned by John Nix, an LBSCR director. At Lampson's request a shelter was provided for his coachmen. Before and during World War Two an Air Force Reserve Storage Depot, was constructed adjacent to the station and railway line.

== Train services ==
Rowfant, initially the only intermediate station between Three Bridges and East Grinstead, saw an initial service of six passenger trains per day, with two on Sundays. By 1859 this had increased to nine services with one early morning goods train, and four Sunday services. The opening of another intermediate station in 1860, Grange Road, saw passenger trains cut to six on weekdays. An additional siding and crossover were provided in 1878, the siding serving a nearby brickworks. The station was further enlarged in 1900-1901 when it became a crossing station with a new 500-foot (150 m) up platform and footbridge. In 1906 the introduction of new motor carriages led to an increase in weekday services.

== Closure ==
Nevertheless, Rowfant saw very little passenger traffic and jointly held with Kingscote the record for the least revenue for passenger journeys on the LBSCR. Although it saw a brief revival in terms of freight traffic when Gatwick Airport opened in the late 1950s and jet fuel was stored in the Petroleum Storage Depot, its days were numbered and it closed with the rest of the line in January 1967 under the programme of closures put forward by local resident and British Rail Chairman, Richard Beeching.

== The site today ==
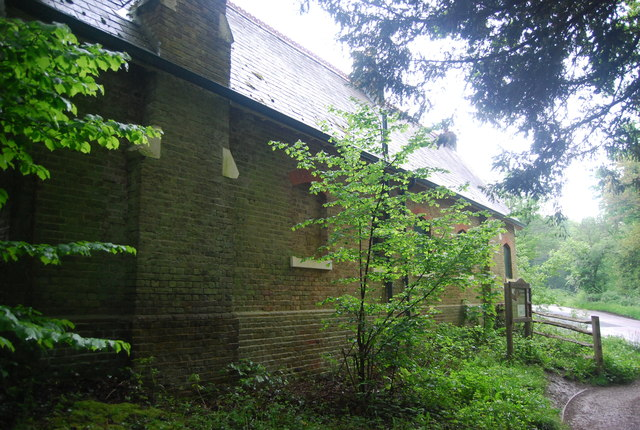
The old Rowfant Station, 2013.

Today the majority of the station survives, with the station site and goods yard occupied by a company producing road-building materials, Colas Limited. The station building, stationmaster's house and part of the Down platform survive. The Worth Way, a public footpath following the line of the railway, runs alongside the north face of the station building which is currently disused with its windows and doorways bricked up.

== Former fuel storage depot ==
Originally constructed by Shell-Mex & BP as an Air Force Reserve Depot during the war in two phases in 1938–9 and 1943–4 with two sites. Three 4,000 ton, ten 900 ton, one 450 ton white oil tanks; two 250 ton and two 500 ton lube oil tanks. Semi-buried fuel and lube oil tanks were built on both sides of the East Grinstead/Rowfant Railway Station road. there were road loading facilities for white and lube oils and a rail gantry about 300 metres east of the depot on sidings at the railway station. The site was handed over by the Air Ministry to the Ministry of Power in 1959. It was declared surplus in 1982, demolished in 1991 and sold in 1999.

Preceding station	Disused railways	Following station
Three Bridges	British Rail; Southern Region; Three Bridges to Tunbridge Wells Central Line	Grange Road

== See also ==
- List of closed railway stations in Britain
