= Crawley Down =

Village in West Sussex, England

Coordinates: 51.1214°N 0.0788°W

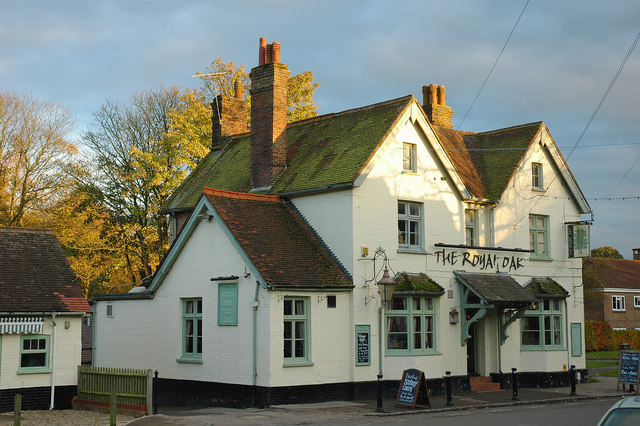
- The Royal Oak Public House (closed), Crawley Down

- Location within West Sussex
- Population: 4,598 (2011 census)
- OS grid reference: TQ345375
- Civil parish: Worth
- District: Mid Sussex
- Shire county: West Sussex
- Region: South East
- Country: England
- Sovereign state: United Kingdom
- Post town: Crawley
- Postcode district: RH10
- Dialling code: 01342
- Police: Sussex
- Fire: West Sussex
- Ambulance: South East Coast
- UK Parliament: Horsham

Crawley Down is a village in the Mid Sussex district of West Sussex, England. There is one church, one school, and a number of social groups. It lies 6 miles (9.7 km) east of Crawley and 7 miles (11 km) east of Gatwick Airport. Crawley Down lies in the northeast corner of West Sussex, just one mile from the border with Surrey.

The nearest railway stations are at Three Bridges and East Grinstead. Metrobus routes 281 and 291 operate at roughly-hourly frequencies through the village between Crawley and East Grinstead.

Crawley Down has a King George's Field in memorial to King George V.

== History ==
Until the 17th century, the area now covered by the village was used by iron producers, who sold to the Woodcock hammer in Felbridge. Some small farms were set up in the 1600s, part of a pattern of enclosures in the area in the 17th and 18th centuries. A large manor, The Grange, was built for a London silversmith in the 18th century, and the settlement slowly grew, with a restart of ironworking to supply metal for guns to be used in wars with France. In the 19th century, after iron working had ceased, the local clay was mined for bricks.

In the 19th century, Crawley Down was known as a centre for prizefighting. The illegal sport was attracted by the proximity to London, combined with a secluded location. Large and boisterous crowds were attracted to the matches, and local law enforcement turned a blind eye as the prizefights were a useful source of income for the village.

The railway from Three Bridges to Tunbridge Wells passed through the village, and although a land dispute delayed its construction, a station was built for brick transport. The railway connected the village with East Grinstead, Tunbridge Wells and London, and spurred rapid growth of the village, with several new estates, namely Down Park, Tiltwood, and Huntsland. All Saints Church was built in 1843, and a Primary School attached to the church.

Until 1967 the village was served by Grange Road railway station on the Three Bridges to Tunbridge Wells Central Line which closed as a result of the Beeching Axe in 1967. The old track bed has been revitalised as a linear Country Park called the Worth Way which now offers a haven for wildlife and valued trail for walkers, cyclists and horse riders.

Crawley Down has a Non-League football club, Crawley Down Gatwick F.C., that plays at The Haven Sportsfield.
