= Forest Row railway station =

Former railway station in England

Forest Row

General information
- Location: Forest Row, Wealden, East Sussex; England
- Coordinates: 51°5′56″N 0°2′19″E
- Grid reference: TQ428352
- Platforms: 2

Other information
- Status: Disused

History
- Original company: East Grinstead, Groombridge and Tunbridge Wells Railway
- Pre-grouping: London, Brighton and South Coast Railway
- Post-grouping: Southern Railway; Southern Region of British Railways

Key dates
- 1 October 1866: Opened
- 2 January 1967: Closed
Location

Forest Row was a railway station on the Three Bridges to Tunbridge Wells Central Line which closed in 1967, a casualty of the Beeching Axe.

The station opened on 1 October 1866 and the buildings were designed by Charles Henry Driver.

The station was one of the busiest of the intermediate stations on the line and was enlarged in 1897 with the addition of a new platform on the Down side, connected to the main station side via a footbridge. The station also had a goods shed and two sidings. Ironically, the station's final years saw an increased number of passengers using it as residential development took place around the old Forest Row village. In recognition of the increased patronage, commuter trains from London were extended from East Grinstead to terminate here. At the time of closure, Forest Row was taking over £5,000 per annum in revenue and 200 commuters were using the station to travel to London each day.

After the station closed, it was used for the filming of an episode of the children's television programme Do Not Adjust Your Set in August/September 1967 featuring a young David Jason. The site was then sold to a club for over £4,000 and the station buildings were quickly swept away. Nevertheless, a short section of the station platforms can still be found, and the goods shed stands together with other light industrial units. A brick-built coal merchant's office can also be found on Station Road.

Preceding station	Disused railways	Following station
East Grinstead High Level	British Rail; Southern Region; Three Bridges to Tunbridge Wells Central Line	Hartfield

== Gallery ==
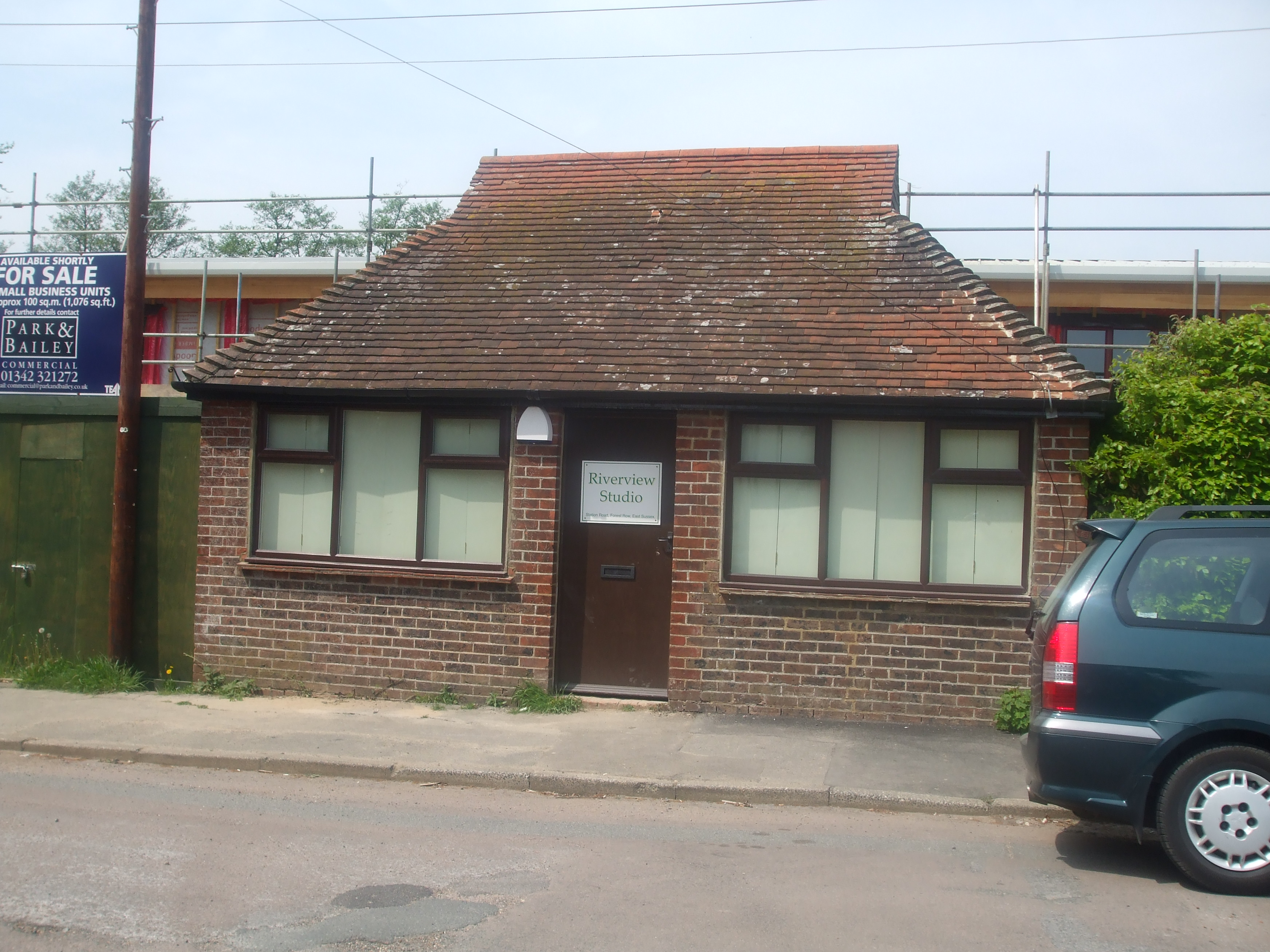
Former station coal office

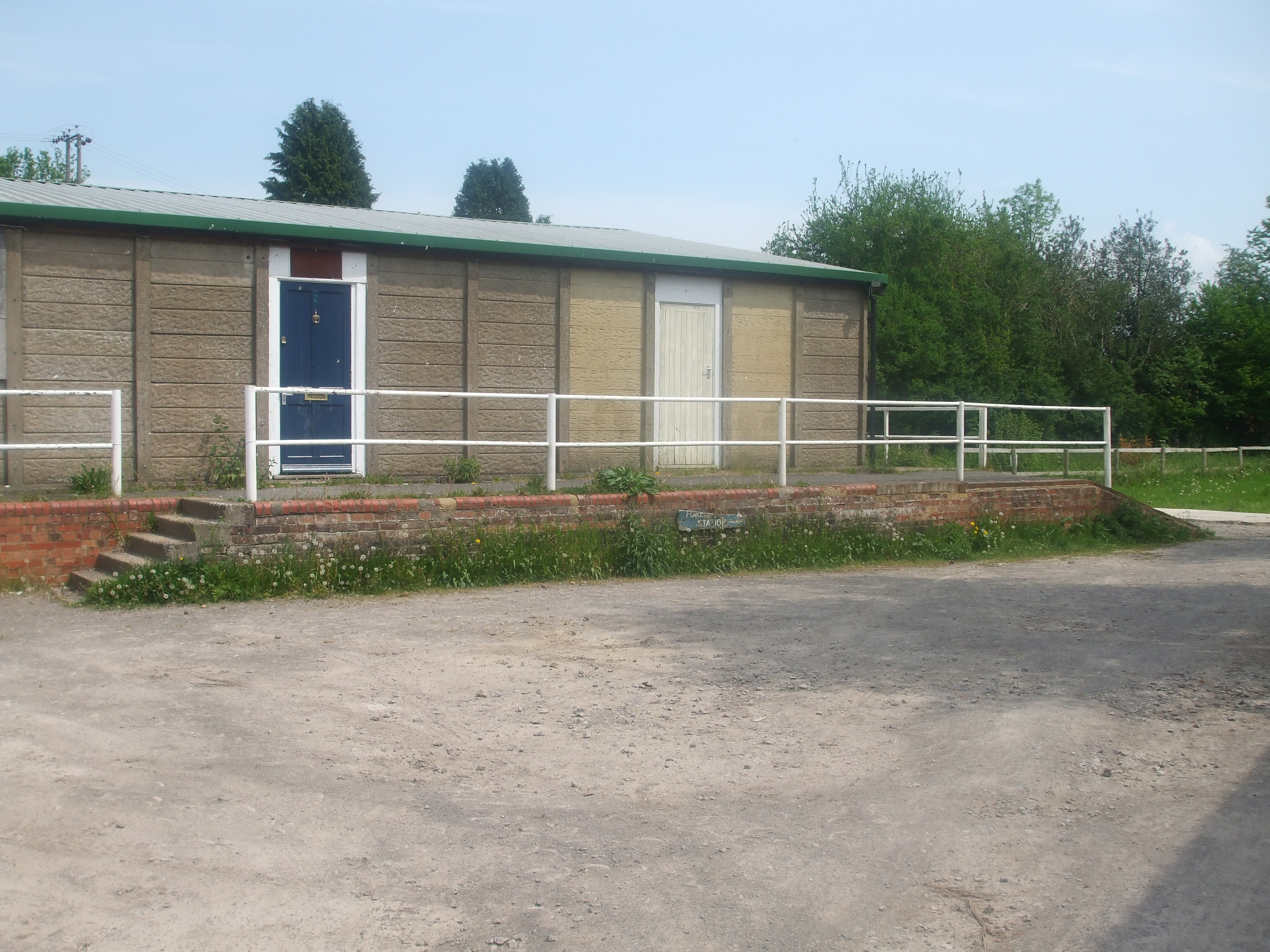
Remains of platform

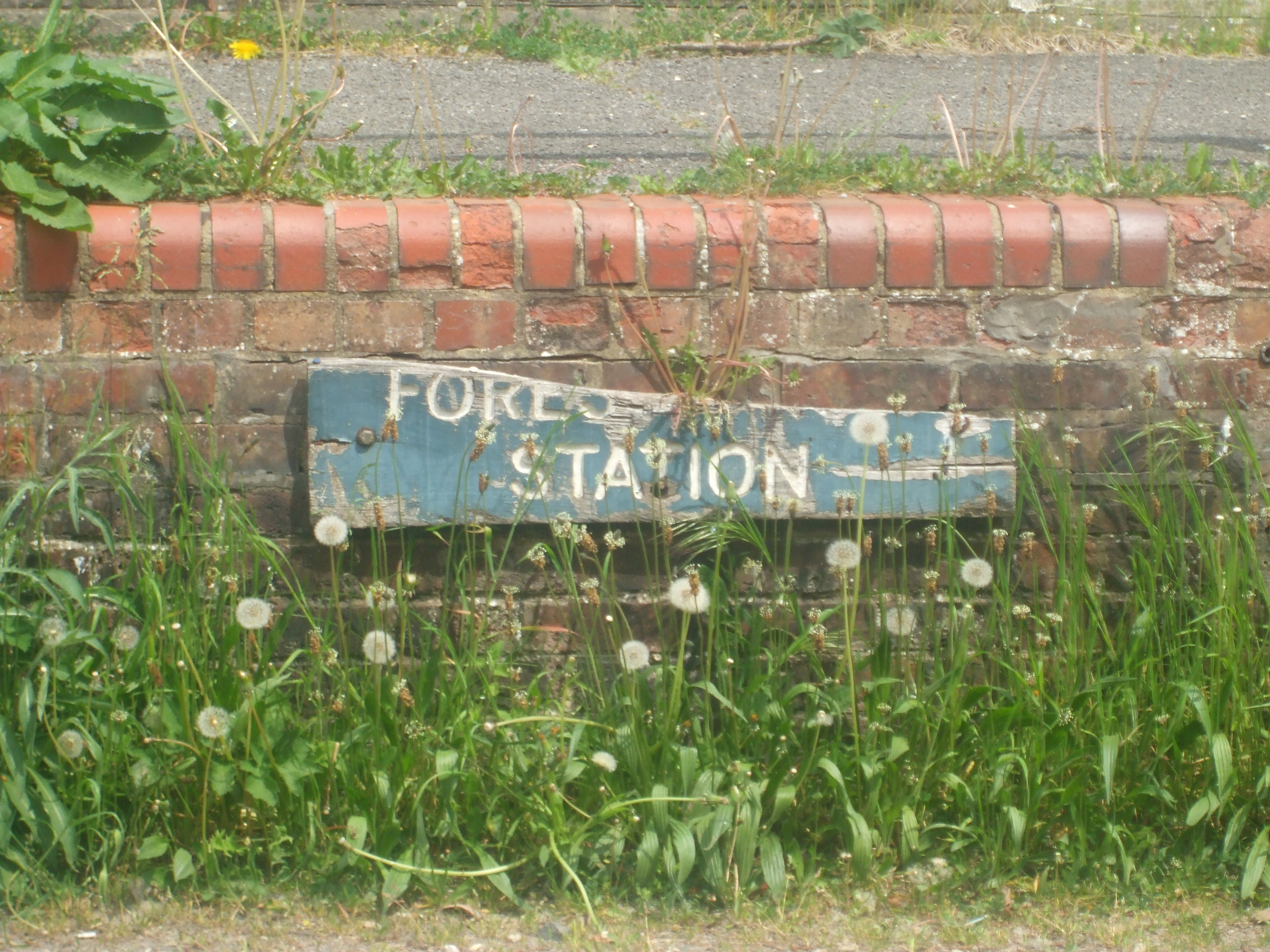
Platform sign (probably not original)

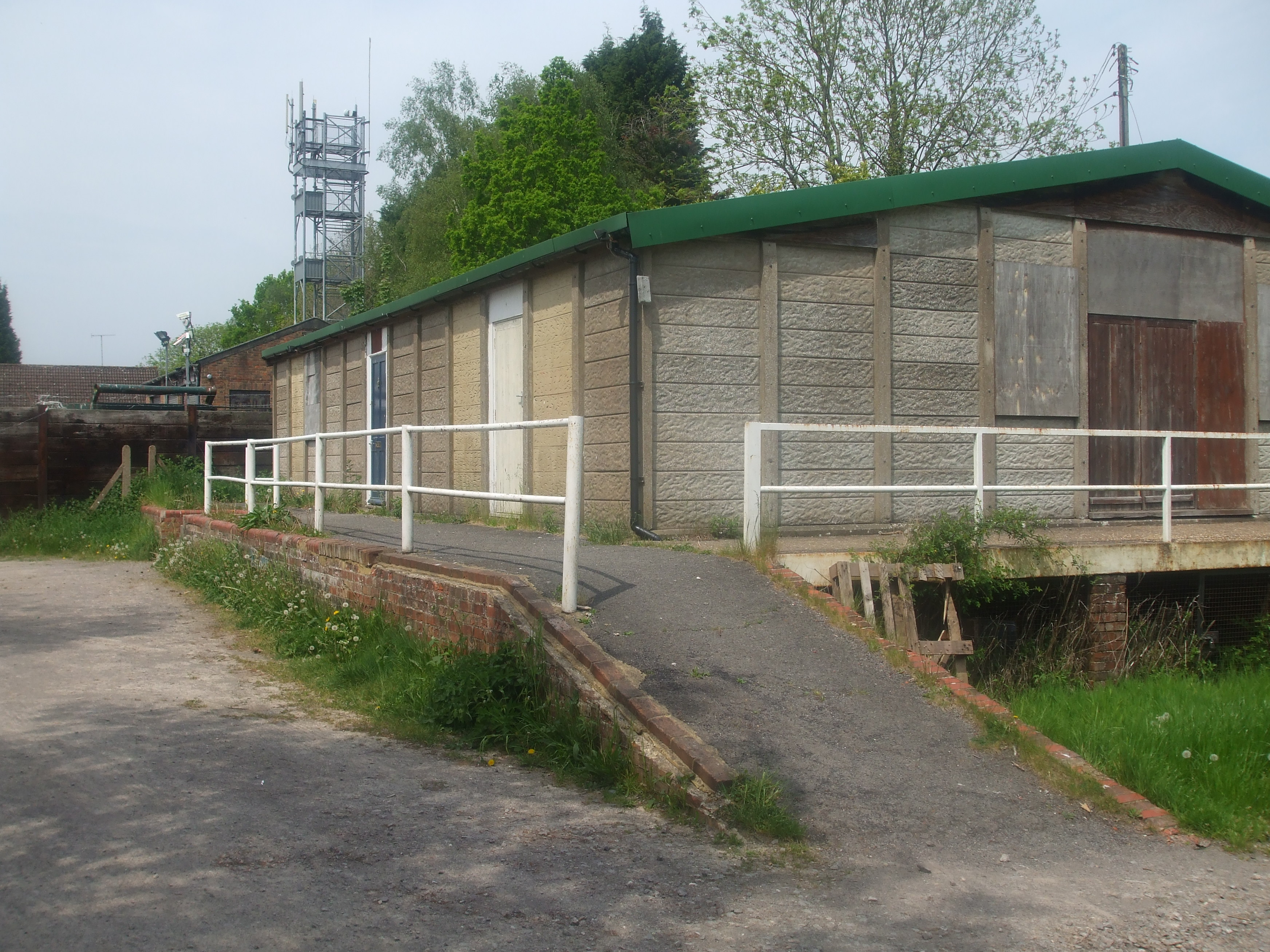
Station platform looking west

== See also ==
- List of closed railway stations in Britain
