= Grange Road railway station =

Former railway station in England

Coordinates: 51.1206°N 0.0776°W

Grange Road
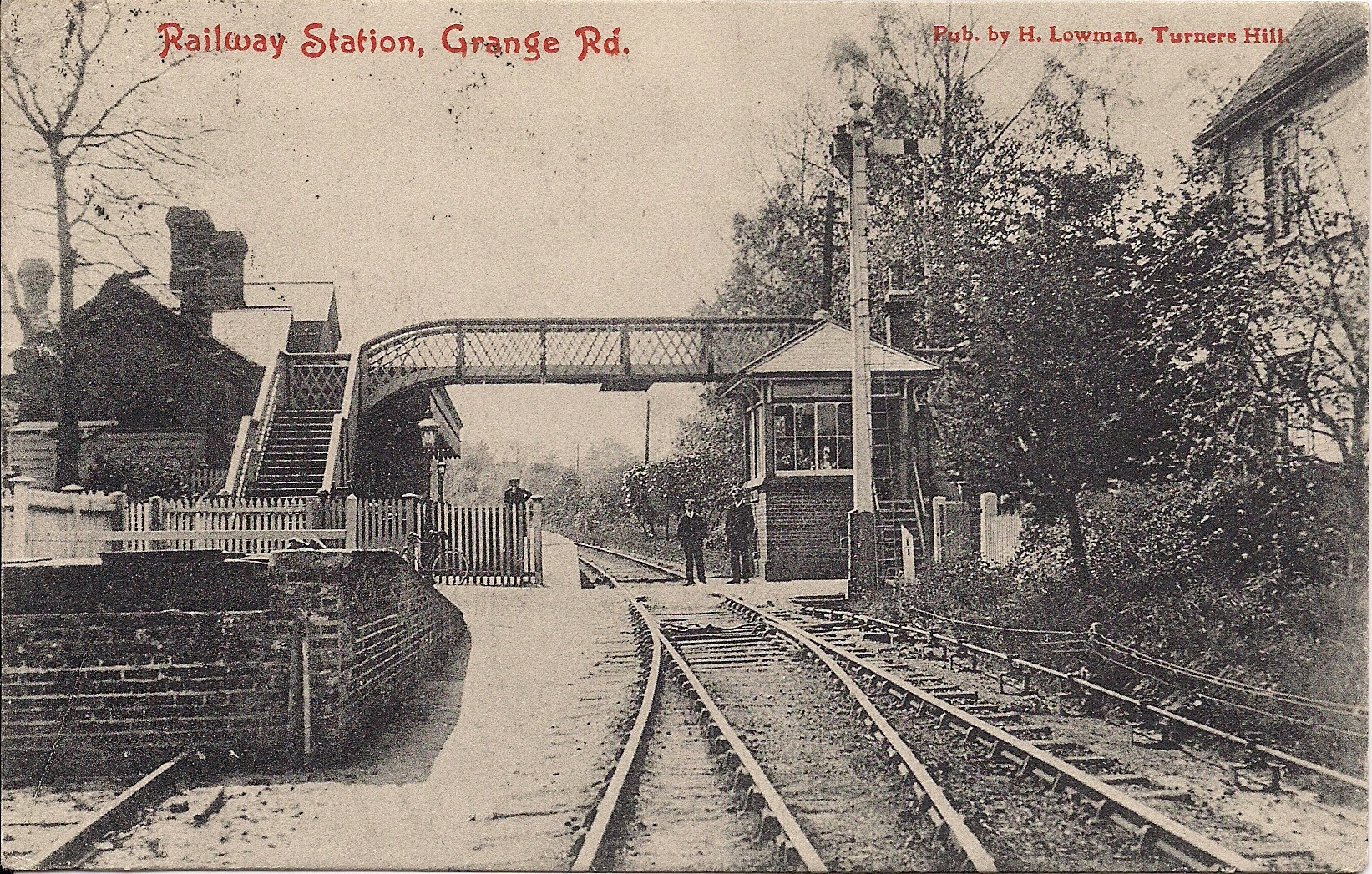

General information
- Location: Crawley Down, Mid Sussex, West Sussex; England
- Grid reference: TQ346375
- Platforms: 1

Other information
- Status: Disused

History
- Pre-grouping: London, Brighton and South Coast Railway
- Post-grouping: Southern Railway; Southern Region of British Railways

Key dates
- March 1860: First station opened
- 1876: resited
- 2 January 1967: Closed
Location

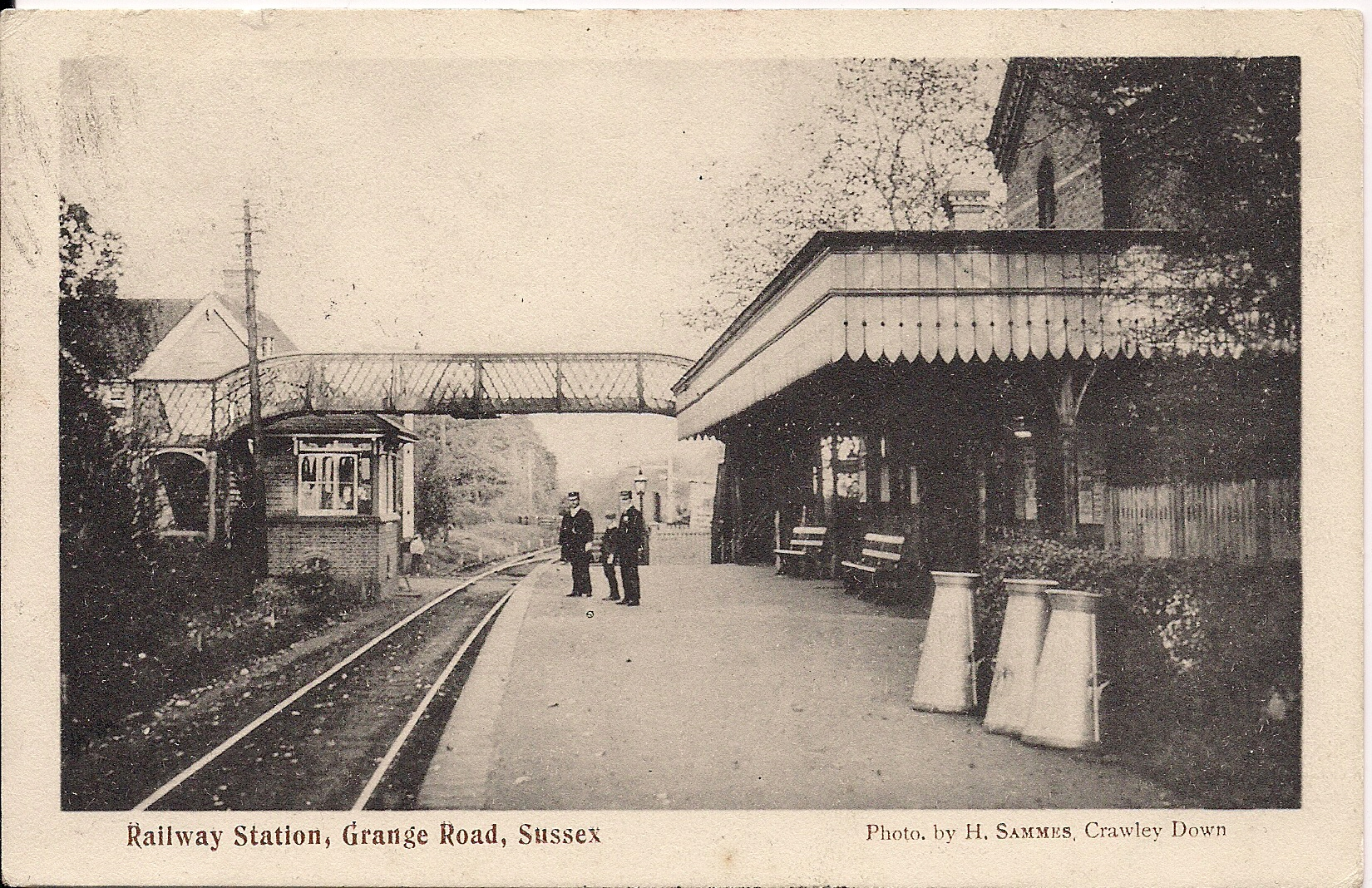
Grange Road, c1905

Grange Road was a railway station on the Three Bridges to Tunbridge Wells Central Line. The first station opened in 1860 and was sited on the east side of the level crossing. In 1876 a new enlarged station was opened on the west side of the level crossing, with a footbridge added in 1897. The station and railway closed in 1967, a casualty of the Beeching Axe. Good facilities in the station were withdrawn from 2.10.1961.

== Objection ==
The original proposal to construct the railway line drew objections from one J. H. Wilson, the owner of "The Grange" house, who refused to allow a station on his estate and demanded that the line be deviated through a tunnel. The railway company was not prepared to go to such expense and it was agreed instead that the route of the line would be shifted north. Wilson still stubbornly refused to part with his land and required the matter to be taken to arbitration under the Lands Clauses Consolidation Act 1845 (8 & 9 Vict. c. 18). Before the arbitrator he demanded £5,500 compensation, but only received £1,400. In deference to Mr Wilson, the station, which opened in March 1860, was named "Grange Road" and later "Grange Road for Crawley Down and Turners Hill".

== Development ==
At first, only three trains a day called at the station but this changed from 2 April 1860 when all trains would stop there upon request. It ceased to be a request stop in 1865 and was resited with a larger station in 1876, with a footbridge added in 1897. The arrival of the railway provided the impetus for wealthy Victorian entrepreneurs to build large estates in what had previously been an entirely agricultural area. Seeing the development potential, farmers such as Arthur Royds, the owner of Down Park Farm, sold off their farmland. Royds' farm was sold to James Harrison, a barrister from Caterham, who had a mansion built on the site. These large estates required domestic staff and became major employers in the area, drawing yet more migrants many of whom married and settled in the area.

== Closure ==
Although the railway did attract a large influx of migrants to what became Crawley Down which developed further in the 1930s, the real expansion of the community came between the years 1971 to 1981 when the population more than doubled, notably with the construction of the Burleigh Wood housing estate. This was too late to save the railway line and Grange Road station which closed in 1967 under the programme put forward by East Grinstead resident and British Rail Chairman, Richard Beeching. The station was closed irrespective of the fact that annual takings were over £5,000, and 80 people were using the station every day to commute up to London.

== The site today ==
The station buildings were swept away to be replaced by a small parade of shops with flats above them and a new medical centre. The nearest station is now some distance away and, at a time where Crawley Down has been singled out for future residential expansion, the town finds itself relatively isolated from public transport. As noted by Mid Sussex District Council in February 2007, "whilst there is a reasonable bus service to East Grinstead from Crawley Down, the nearest railway station (in East Grinstead) is over five kilometres away. It is highly likely that residents will have to use private transport to access virtually all services, including even those provided within the village. This would bring about associated environmental problems."

Preceding station	Disused railways	Following station
Rowfant	British Rail; Southern Region; Three Bridges to Tunbridge Wells Central Line	East Grinstead High Level

== See also ==
- List of closed railway stations in Britain
