= Three Bridges–Tunbridge Wells line =

Railway line in southeast England

Coordinates: 51°06′44″N 0°00′29″E

The Three Bridges–Tunbridge Wells line is a mostly disused railway line running from Three Bridges (on the Brighton Main Line) in West Sussex to Tunbridge Wells Central in Kent via East Grinstead in West Sussex (East Sussex pre-1974), a distance of 20 miles 74 chains (33.7 km). Opened in 1855, the main section of the line was a casualty of the Beeching Axe – the last train ran on 1 January 1967. The remaining section to Tunbridge Wells closed on 6 July 1985, although the section between Groombridge and Tunbridge Wells West was reopened in 1997 under the auspices of the Spa Valley Railway.

== Three Bridges–East Grinstead ==
By the mid-19th century East Grinstead, then a small market town, found itself excluded from the development of the railway network in the south-east; the nearest town, Godstone, was connected to the South Eastern Railway's (SER) London to Dover line, whilst the London and Brighton Railway's (LBR) Brighton Main Line had linked in Three Bridges as well as the supposedly less important towns of Haywards Heath and Horley. As the town began to lose custom to places with railway facilities, the East Grinstead traders began to clamour for a connection; some landowners and gentry pushed for an extension from Godstone, whilst others were in favour of a branch line from Three Bridges. In 1845 the SER and LBR promoted rival bills for lines through the town, but these both came to nothing: the local townspeople withdrew their support for the SER proposal once it moved the terminus of its line from London Road to a point outside East Grinstead where St Margaret's Junction is now situated. The LBSCR's bill was passed; however, due to a sudden economic crisis this scheme was abandoned.

=== The East Grinstead Railway ===
In July 1852 a public meeting took place in East Grinstead to discuss the setting-up of a railway company which would build a line to Three Bridges. The majority of landowners affected were in favour and a contractor, a Mr Hale, agreed to carry out the works for £40,000. Unfortunately, he was killed in accident shortly afterwards. A company, the East Grinstead Railway Company (EGR), was incorporated in November to promote a bill authorising a railway between Three Bridges and East Grinstead. The bill was not opposed by the LBR which was more than happy for a third party to bear the construction costs; furthermore, the LBR ensured that a provision was inserted in the bill allowing it to purchase the line at any time within ten years of construction, and until then to pay the EGR an annual rental of £2,000 while it worked the line on their behalf.

East Grinstead Railway Act 1853
- Act of Parliament
- Parliament of the United Kingdom
- Long title: An Act for making a Railway from the London, Brighton, and South Coast Railway to or near to the Town of East Grinstead in the County of Sussex
- Citation: 16 & 17 Vict. c. lxxxviii

Dates
- Royal assent: 8 July 1853

Text of statute as originally enacted

The EGR's bill received royal assent on 8 July 1853 and passed into law as the East Grinstead Railway Act 1853 (16 & 17 Vict. c. lxxxviii). It authorised a single track line covering a distance of 6 miles 67 chains (11.0 km). Before the act was passed the route underwent a late change necessitated by a landowner's objections: a Mr J. H. Wilson who occupied "The Grange" in Crawley Down. He refused to allow a station on his land and demanded the line be deviated through a tunnel. The EGR's directors were not willing to go to the expense of building a tunnel, and so it was agreed that the route of the line would be changed to deviate through what was to become Grange Road railway station.

=== Construction ===
The first post-authorisation EGR board meeting was held at the Crown Inn in East Grinstead on 6 October 1853. Present were the company's directors, all prominent local businessmen, led by John Dorrien Magens (Chairman), George Head, William Stenning, Charles Tooke and Frederick Cayley Worsley. The costs of construction were estimated at £50,000 – the same amount which the LBR had proposed to pay for the line when it was ready. George Wythes of Reigate agreed to construct the line for £43,700, and the ceremonial cutting of the first sod was carried out on Tuesday 22 November.

By September 1854 the works had advanced sufficiently for the EGR's joint company secretary, Mr W. Pearless, to report that "rapid progress" had been made and that nearly all the necessary land purchases had been made. Only Mr Wilson of The Grange was stubbornly refusing to part with his land and required the matter to be taken to arbitration under the Lands Clauses Consolidation Act 1845 (8 & 9 Vict. c. 18). Before the arbitrator Wilson demanded £5,500 compensation, but only received £1,400. The EGR's engineer, Robert Jacomb-Hood (also the LBR's chief engineer), confirmed the progress of works: only three cuttings remained to be completed, a public road bridge needed to be built and only 4 miles (6.4 km) of permanent way was ready.

Mid-May 1855 saw last minute works on the line before the scheduled inspection by the Board of Trade's Lt.-Col. George Wynne on 22 June. The station at East Grinstead was in its final stages and the line from Three Bridges was ready. Wynne found no fault with the line, requiring only an undertaking from the EGR to the effect that the line would only be worked by a single engine.

=== Opening ===
The line was officially opened on Monday 9 July 1855. A public holiday in East Grinstead marked the occasion which was celebrated by over 200 guests and a "railway band". Among those present was local landowner the Earl de la Warr who commented that although the line was not long, "its importance was not to be measured merely by its length." The total amount expended on the line's construction was £48,721.

Initial passenger services consisted of six trains each way on weekdays, with two services on Sundays. Total journey time was 20 minutes each way. A passenger wishing to catch an onward connection to London could take the first train from East Grinstead at 06:55, but had to wait 43 minutes in Three Bridges for a connection which would arrive in London at 09:15. The last Down train was the 18:00 service from London which would connect with a service from Three Bridges scheduled to arrive in East Grinstead at 19:40. A 0-4-2 saddle tank locomotive No. 22 was built in 1855 to work the line and remained in service until 1866. The fare up to London was six shillings for first class travel, and three shillings for third class.

=== Early years ===
The early years were regarded as a success for the line by the EGR's directors, and by 1859 eight passenger services were run daily in each direction, with four trains on Sundays. A new station, "Grange Road", opened in March 1860 and, at first, it only saw three trains each day, but with effect from 2 April 1860 it became a 'request stop', with all trains calling there if required.

The LBR – now the London, Brighton and South Coast Railway (LBSCR) – went ahead with its purchase of the line in January 1865, a sum of £53,000 being paid to the EGR which was not, however, enough for the EGR's shareholders to have their capital back in full.

=== Route of the line ===
Departing Three Bridges station on a curve, the line passed under the London to Brighton road before climbing at 1 in 88, passing over a level crossing known as "Compasses Crossing" and, just before arriving at Rowfant station, crossed Wallage Lane on the level. The line then climbed again at 1 in 80 passing through a 42-foot (13 m) deep cutting in J.H. Wilson's land and Grange Road station, travelling through an arable and wooded landscape before arriving at East Grinstead station which was in Swan Mead, off the London Road.

== Extension to Tunbridge Wells ==
East Grinstead, Groombridge and Tunbridge Wells Railway Act 1862
- Act of Parliament
- Parliament of the United Kingdom
- Long title: An Act for making a Railway, to be called "The East Grinstead, Groombridge, and Tunbridge Wells Railway," and for other Purposes.
- Citation: 25 & 26 Vict. c. ccvii

Dates
- Royal assent: 7 August 1862

As with the initial connection between Three Bridges and East Grinstead, the impetus for an extension to Tunbridge Wells came from local landowners who, as early as 1855, had enquired as to the possibility of an extension east. The East Grinstead, Groombridge and Tunbridge Wells Railway Act 1862 (25 & 26 Vict. c. ccvii), passed on 7 August 1862, authorised this extension and a company of the same name oversaw the scheme. Just one year previously, the Brighton, Uckfield and Tunbridge Wells Railway Act 1861 (24 & 25 Vict. c. clxxiv) had been adopted, sanctioning an extension of the Wealden Line from its terminus at Uckfield to Tunbridge Wells. Construction works were already underway.

=== Groombridge and Tunbridge Wells Railway ===
The East Grinstead, Groombridge and Tunbridge Wells Railway (EGGTW) was incorporated by the East Grinstead, Groombridge and Tunbridge Wells Railway Act 1862 and its first directors were the Earl de la Warr, his son Lord West, C.B. and John Pryce. These three were also shareholders together with a fourth person, Edward Parker. The company's capital was £75,000 divided into 7,500 shares and when all these shares had been subscribed for, the company was authorised to borrow up to £25,000. Included amongst the powers of the company was the power to "construct and thereafter maintain a convenient siding at Withyham for the use of the Earl de la Warr." In addition, it was required to cross a private carriage road to Ashdown House via a bridge under the road and not a level crossing. In fact, it was not authorised to alter the level of any roads except one near East Grinstead station, which could only be raised by seven feet.

As with the first section between East Grinstead and Three Bridges, the extension would be single tracked throughout except at a re-sited East Grinstead station. The station was to be relocated north at a lower level to enable the line to pass under London Road. The old station would then become a goods yard.

=== Construction ===
The ceremony of cutting the first turf took place in the Fair Field, off Lewes Road, just outside East Grinstead on Saturday 18 July 1863. Lord West and Leo Schuster, chairman of the LBSCR, took part in the ritual.

John Watson & Co. of 47 Parliament Square was chosen as the line's contractor, with the LBSCR's chief engineer Frederick Banister as designer, surveyor and engineer. The station buildings on the line were designed by Charles Henry Driver. The construction itself was not straightforward; a 30-foot (9.1 m) deep cutting had to be driven through the Fair Field, with brick-lined tunnels under College Lane (78 yards or 71 metres) and Lewes Road (48 yards or 44 metres). Powder was used by the contractor in the digging out of the cutting and a navvy, a James Bourne, was killed on 11 April 1865 when, following an explosion, he was buried up to his neck in the clay which was thrown up. His was not the only death in the line's construction, the Tunbridge Wells Gazette reported on 9 September 1864 that a man had died following injuries sustained when he was run over by a wagon on the line near Withyham. The storage of the powder by the contractor also raised other problems. Locals complained when the powder was stored in a wooden shed near a school in East Grinstead and the contractor was fined two shillings by East Grinstead magistrates in April 1865.

By March 1866 the line still had not been opened and questions were raised as to how much longer it would take. As reported in the Sussex Express, "nearly everyone in the town [of East Grinstead] is now looking anxiously for news about our new line, which is to make this town a large city and the centre of attraction to all this side of the Thames." In fact, the line was still incomplete and Groombridge station remained unfinished by June.

Believing nevertheless that the line ready for inspection by the Board of Trade, the LBSCR agreed that its Captain J.H. Rich would carry out an inspection on 24 July, with a view to possibly opening the whole section to the public from 1 August. However, Captain Rich found defects and refused to authorise the opening. He objected in particular to the incomplete signalling and interlocking, as well as the inadequate platform fencing along the whole of the line and an ungated level crossing at Brambletye Farm. A second inspection was carried out on 22 August and again Captain Rich refused authorisation. The locking apparatus at East Grinstead was still incomplete, two sidings had to be trapped, clocks were to be provided at all stations and Brambletye Crossing was to be equipped with ordinary field gates. A third inspection was arranged for 13 September and on this occasion the line was passed fit for opening. It did not, however, open on the day planned by the LBSCR, Monday 17 September, as insufficient time had been allowed for the Board of Trade to consider the undertaking provided by the LBSCR as to how it was to operate the line (by staff and ticket), and the opening was postponed once more.

=== Opening ===
The line finally opened on Monday 1 October 1866 to little press coverage. The LBSCR itself distributed advertisements announcing the "Opening to Tunbridge Wells. New short and pleasant route to and from London, Brighton, the South Coast, the Isle of Wight, and the West of England." Fares began at 3s 6d for a third class single (return was 5s 3d), 5s 6d for a second class single (8s 3d return) and 8s for a first class single (12s return).

Initial services were poor: only six services per day were laid on, with one fast train in each direction. Only two trains each way ran on Sundays. The entire length of the line was 20 miles 74 chains (33.7 km), making for a journey time of 55 minutes (assuming an all-stations service).

On 24 October a cheap excursion ran from Tunbridge Wells to Brighton with about 420 passengers on board.

== Operations ==
=== 1867–1881 ===
The poor state of the LBSCR's finances led to cutbacks in services to four each way per day in November 1867 – the worst in the line's history. The railway company had overextended itself in the promotion of new lines and another national economic recession led to difficulties in obtaining funding.

The single track extension of the Wealden Line from Uckfield to Groombridge was opened on 3 August 1868 and six trains began to run each day between Tunbridge Wells and Brighton. These, plus the four to and from Three Bridges, led to the Groombridge–Tunbridge Wells section being extensively used, and eventually double-tracked by January 1872. On 24 January 1876 a short connecting link between Tunbridge Wells Central and the Hastings Line was opened, allowing through running to that line via Tonbridge. Four trains provided by the South Eastern Railway began to run daily.

On 2 February 1869 the LBSCR held their half-yearly board meeting at which the state of its finances was discussed. It was remarked that fifteen years previously the company had been a profitable enterprise but, as a result of ruinous expenditure on useless lines, that was no longer the case. The East Grinstead to Tunbridge Wells line was one such unprofitable line: despite having invested approximately £174,046 into its construction, the return was, by the half-year ending 30 June, only £3,033. This was against a train mileage of 23,555 with working expenses of 3 shillings per train mile, resulting in a loss of £500.

Nevertheless, increases in traffic from January 1874 led to general service improvements, with notably the introduction of a 09:00 service to London from Tunbridge Wells. From July 1877 another London service was introduced, a fast train leaving Tunbridge Wells at 10:00 to arrive at London Victoria at 11:30, with stops at Groombridge and Withyham (for first class passengers), and then at Forest Row, East Grinstead and Three Bridges.

=== 1880–1900 ===
Even more services began to use the Groombridge–Tunbridge Wells section from 1 September 1880 with the extension of the Cuckoo Line to Eridge and a connection with the Three Bridges line at Birchden Junction.

In May 1882 a third re-modelling of East Grinstead station was completed. The new station, less conveniently sited 300 yards (270 m) to the west of its predecessor, was made necessary by, first, the arrival from the south of an extension of the Lewes and East Grinstead Railway (L&EG) on 1 August, which was followed on 10 March 1884, by an extension from the north of the Croydon, Oxted and East Grinstead Railway (CO&EG). The L&EG would approach the Three Bridges line from the south at a right angle and the CO&EG would make an end-on junction with it (later known as "St Margaret's Junction" after a nearby Anglican convent). It proved impossible to accommodate the L&EG in the existing East Grinstead station as the enlargements and modifications entailed would mean buying out the adjoining Stenning's timber yard, which the LBSCR refused to contemplate. The new station was arranged on two levels: the higher equipped with two island platforms serving four tracks on the Three Bridges line, the lower a double line two-platformed station set at a right angle to the L&EG. A sharply curving spur line (later known as the "St. Margaret's Loop") would enter the high level station from the CO&EG, requiring a deviation of the Three Bridges line on its western approach to the new station in order to ease the sharpness of the bend. The new station was officially opened and the old one officially closed from 15 October 1883.

From April 1884 the Grove Junction section linking Tunbridge Wells Central and Tunbridge Wells West was used as part of a through route by the South Eastern Railway which ran two services a day to and from Charing Cross and Eastbourne via Tunbridge Wells and Heathfield. The LBSCR had allowed the South Eastern running rights over its section rather than having it lay its own connection. A non-stop service from Tunbridge Wells reached Eastbourne in 67 minutes.

During this period the LBSCR was once again experiencing financial difficulties and traffic, poor in 1882, was worse still the following year. This time services were not cut back, even expanded so that, by January 1884, seven daily services ran between Tunbridge Wells and Brighton, plus two goods services on Fridays. Furthermore, a private siding was brought into use for Imberhorne Farm between East Grinstead and Grange Road on the north side of the line. Traffic began to pick up again by 1887 coinciding with the opening on 1 October 1888 of the Oxted and Groombridge Railway: a direct line from Oxted to Tunbridge Wells via Edenbridge which would join the Three Bridges line approximately 2 miles (3.2 km) to the west of Withyham. The 13 extra daily services brought by the new connection led to the doubling of the section between the junction with the new line, Ashurst Junction, and Groombridge. It also led to the installation of a second (island) platform at Tunbridge Wells Central.

In May 1894 the line between Eridge and Uckfield was doubled allowing an improved service between Tunbridge Wells and Brighton of 11 services per day. Around the same period, improvements were carried out at stations along the line. At Tunbridge Wells West new waiting rooms and a platform canopy were installed and a new four track engine shed was built at the west end of the station, opening in 1891. A platform extension, new bay road, railway cottages, a cattle dock and a new 33-lever signalbox were also installed.

=== 1900–1914 ===
From 1906 the services on the line began to be supplemented by new motorised carriages fitted with mechanically worked controls enabling them to be hauled or propelled by small tank locomotives. These carriages were third-class only and came to be known as "balloons" after their high arched roofs. Their introduction was an attempt by the LBSCR to reduce their ever-rising operating costs on the line; the first ran from East Grinstead to Three Bridges at 10:35, returning at 11:20 for the 12:30 working to Brighton. On 1 June 1907 a new halt was opened at High Rocks to be served exclusively by these carriages.

Quadrupling of the Brighton Main Line in 1909-1910 led to Three Bridges station being largely rebuilt, leaving the East Grinstead bay platform and the Down main platform largely untouched, but relocating the locomotive shed to a different site. Around this period services on the Three Bridges line reached their peak with eight Down trains and nine Up trains through the whole line, three workings from Three Bridges to Forest Row, three from East Grinstead to Three Bridges, and one in the other direction. Two Up and Down trains used the St. Margaret's Loop. In 1912 fares were 4s 11d for a third class return from East Grinstead to London (rising to 8s 10d in first class) and 5s 5d for a third class return from Tunbridge Wells to London (rising to 10s in first class). Cheap day tickets up to London were sold on Wednesdays on the 09:36 via Three Bridges for 5s first class, 3s 6d third class.

The opening to traffic of a 68-chain (1.4 km) spur at Withyham on 8 June 1914 marked the last track development in the line's history. Although it had been built as a siding at the time of the opening of the CO&EG, it had only been used until then for the storage of locomotives. The spur's opening allowed through-running from Brighton and Eastbourne to London without having to pass through Groombridge. New 35-lever and 20-lever signalboxes were provided at Ashurst Junction (where a trailing connection was added in 1906) and at Birchden Junction.

=== First World War ===
The war brought no immediate great changes to the line which maintained its level of service until 1916. A procedure was established for the reporting of enemy aircraft: Brighton would report to Lewes Main Junction and Keymer Junction, Lewes would then contact Groombridge Junction which would advise the two Tunbridge Wells stations, Groombridge, Eridge, Ashurst Junction, Forest Row, Withyham and Hartfield. Keymer Junction would report to Three Bridges which would in turn advise Rowfant and East Grinstead High Level. The latter would advise the Low Level, Kingscote and West Hoathly. From 1917 two services were withdrawn and staff shortages led to female ticket collectors being employed.

The post-war period was to prove more challenging for the LBSCR with the national railway strike in 1919, followed by two coalminers' strikes in 1920 and 1921 which resulted in reduced levels of service far worse than anything seen during the war. Problems were also experienced with the Oxted Tunnel south of Woldingham which led to services being diverted through the Three Bridges Line. It was only in 1922 that services began to creep back to their pre-war levels.

=== Southern Railway 1923–1947 ===
Following the grouping ordered by the Railways Act 1921 the LBSCR became a constituent company of the Southern Railway. New morning Down services were introduced from July 1925: 07:30 and 08:25 from Three Bridges to East Grinstead (completing the trip in 18 minutes) and a 10:40 service from London Bridge to Tunbridge Wells via Forest Row. Two new lunchtime services were also scheduled: a 13:40 from Three Bridges to East Grinstead, and a 13:27 Saturday service from London Victoria to Forest Row. In the Up direction, presumably for the benefit of those commuting up to London, a 06:50 service from Tonbridge to Cannon Street via East Grinstead replaced a later 07:05 service from Tunbridge Wells to Three Bridges. In addition, extra 07:58 and 08:56 workings from East Grinstead to Three Bridges were laid on, together with extra midday services at 13:08 from Tunbridge Wells to London Bridge via Forest Row and a 13:56 from East Grinstead to Three Bridges. By July 1930 there were 13 Up and Down daily passenger workings, and four goods services.

The outbreak of the Second World War brought service cutbacks, only four trains ran each way over the whole length of the route. Services were withdrawn that were never to be reinstated such as the 17:08 from London Bridge to Forest Row via Horley.

=== British Rail 1948–1967 ===
==== Gradual decline in services ====
Nationalisation of the railways saw the Southern Region of British Railways (BR) take over responsibility for the Three Bridges Line. High Rocks Halt was an early casualty of the new regime, closing on 5 May 1952 as motorised services withdrawn during the war vanished from timetables. Freight services also began to be gradually run-down from 1 December 1950 when the decision was made to concentrate freight traffic carrying less than full wagonloads at main goods depots to be conveyed to local stations by road. Full wagonloads continued to be dealt with at smaller stations such as Forest Row, Rowfant and Grange Road. BR also tried to close Imberhorne Siding in 1948 on the basis that it did not see sufficient traffic. This was not accepted by the owner of Imberhorne Manor who forced its reinstatement and promptly ordered materials to be delivered by rail. BR did, however, force its closure in 1952.

BR rejected calls to improve the timetabled passenger services which were little better than they had been during the war. It argued that traffic was too light to justify additional staff costs at stations and that, in any event, there was a half-hourly bus service as well as trains up to London via Oxted. The last daily passenger working was therefore the 20:50 from Three Bridges.

==== New 1955 Timetable ====
The announcement was made in 1951 that BR was considering the closure of the line from Three Bridges to Ashurst Junction as well as East Grinstead Low Level to Culver Junction. The fate of the line would depend on the results of two-year traffic surveys conducted by the dreaded "razor gang" or time-and-motion experts. Indeed, Hartfield was highlighted as a station where traffic had dropped off alarmingly, the number of passengers being only a quarter of those in 1923. The outcome of the survey was that the line from East Grinstead to Lewes had to close with effect from Monday 13 June 1955, the argument being that, without the closure, the new 1955 timetable for the Three Bridges Line could not be inaugurated due to insufficient rolling stock.

The new timetable concentrated on key points at Oxted, East Grinstead and the Ashurst-Groombridge-Birchden triangle. It also introduced the concept of a regular hourly service. Off-peak services now departed Victoria for East Grinstead and Tunbridge Wells West at 8 minutes past the hour, and from Tunbridge Wells West for Victoria at 47 minutes past the hour. A push-and-pull service worked the section from Tunbridge Wells West via Edenbridge Town, connecting at Oxted with London trains. A push-pull service was also introduced between Three Bridges and East Grinstead, also providing connections on the main line in both directions. London trains were scheduled to cross in the High Level for a few minutes each hour, ensuring that at a certain time each hour all three trains were together in the station. At Groombridge connections were made with Brighton and Eastbourne services.

Although this timetable brought in some marked service improvements, it had two key weaknesses. First, the East Grinstead-Groombridge section was too well-served often by lengthy trains, as a result of the need to service steam locomotives at the Tunbridge Wells West depot. The small village of Groombridge saw four services an hour to Tunbridge Wells West. This caused considerable losses and when diesel units began working the section, it was possible to terminate most at East Grinstead. Second, East Grinstead Low Level fell into disuse with most services passing through the High Level.

==== Passenger traffic ====
From 1958 a second-class day return to London from Forest Row was 9s 6d; from East Grinstead it was 8s 6d, Grange Road 9s 6d and Rowfant 9s. These increased in 1959 to 10s 6d, 9s 4d, 10s 6d and 9s 10d respectively, although cheaper tickets were sold on Wednesdays and Thursdays. Goods facilities were withdrawn from Grange Road and Rowfant in 1961. In April 1962 the number of season ticket holders to London from stations on the line was: Withyham (2), Hartfield (0), Forest Row (81) and East Grinstead (855).

Passenger numbers were held back by the state of the trains which, as pointed out by the East Grinstead Observer, were as slow and as dirty as ever before, with "ill-lit, time-expired" rolling stock. There had been plans to introduce diesel-electric trains for a few services from March 1962 but, owing to the rundown of Eastleigh Works, production was behind schedule. When eventually eight 3-car units were introduced on 18 June, they were not sufficient to run the line resulting in the older steam services being kept in service. The new diesels prompted complaints from passengers who, although welcoming the extra seating capacity, objected to the lack of corridors and lavatory accommodation, as well as the large number of initial mechanical failures on the units. Steam haulage of passenger trains ceased in 1965.

== Closure ==
=== Beeching Report ===
In March 1963 the Chairman of BR, Dr. Richard Beeching (who incidentally lived in East Grinstead) published a report entitled "The Reshaping of British Railways" which called for a mass programme of closures including the Three Bridges to Tunbridge Wells line. With the loss of the Lewes line in 1958, all that would remain at East Grinstead would be the line to London on which Dr. Beeching was a first-class season-ticket holder. In support of the proposed closure, statistics were produced which showed that, among the passengers travelling daily from East Grinstead, on average 950 went to London, 300 to Three Bridges and 25 to Tunbridge Wells. Amongst those travelling to London via East Grinstead, 200 alighted at Forest Row and about 20 to 30 at Hartfield.

In preparation for the anticipated closure, BR began reducing services. The 08:47 Tunbridge Wells to London Bridge service now started at East Grinstead at 09:38, and the 17:06 Tunbridge Wells to London Bridge service was replaced by an East Grinstead to Victoria working at 17:49. The 18:31 London Bridge–Forest Row service was cut back to East Grinstead, but the 18:48 Victoria to East Grinstead was extended to Forest Row. The push-and-pull shuttle service between East Grinstead and Three Bridges was reduced to peak-hours only.

=== Announcement ===
Details of the proposed closure were published on 18 October when notices appeared at Rowfant, Grange Road, Forest Row, Hartfield and Withyham stations. Objections were invited by the South Eastern Transport Users' Consultative Committee. A public meeting was called by the East Grinstead Urban District Council at which the general sentiment was that the closure would be a disaster for East Grinstead. It was accepted that the line to the east could not be saved, but that a stand should be made for the East Grinstead–Three Bridges section. The Council resolved to urge the Minister of Transport, Ernest Marples, to refuse consent to closure.

The proposed closure prompted a further revision of the timetable with effect from 6 January 1964. Most London trains now only ran to East Grinstead Low Level, and services to Tunbridge Wells operated every two hours. The Oxted–Tunbridge Wells working was diverted to Lewes, effectively cutting off Tunbridge Wells from the Oxted Line. Only seven Down services now ran beyond East Grinstead: 09:09, 16:48 and 17:49 Victoria to Tunbridge Wells, 18:48 Victoria to Forest Row, and 21:09, 22:09 and 23:09 Victoria to Tunbridge Wells. In the other direction, there were only three services: 07:25 Tunbridge Wells to London Bridge, 08:27 Forest Row to Victoria and 15:53 Tunbridge Wells to Victoria. The changes hit Forest Row, Tunbridge Wells West and Groombridge particularly badly. From Forest Row passengers had to make their own way to East Grinstead, whereas at Groombridge and Tunbridge Wells, connections to London were only to be had via Tunbridge Wells Central in the crowded Hastings Line services. From 15 June a new 17:38 direct service from Oxted to Tunbridge Wells was, however, introduced.

On 13 July 1964 Beeching's own 18:10 service from Victoria to East Grinstead had to be diverted via Three Bridges (as did the 17:49 Victoria–Tunbridge Wells) as a result of a train failure at Sanderstead, proving that the condemned line did in fact have its uses. It was reported that the Three Bridges Line was losing £59,300 per year: costing £84,900 to run and bringing in £25,600. BR insisted on treating the line as a whole which overlooked the fact that its western branch from Three Bridges to East Grinstead was much shorter than the loss-making eastern branch. Although Grange Road and Forest Row were both bringing in £5,000 per annum and could be maintained, the other stations (Rowfant, Hartfield and Withyham) could sensibly have been closed as the traffic there was practically nil.

=== Decision ===
Early in 1965 the South Eastern Transport Users' Consultative Committee reported to the new Labour Ministry of Transport that hardship would be caused by the closure of the line. Pending the Minister's decision the last steam service departed Three Bridges on Friday 11 June 1965 at 18:07 and arrived in East Grinstead at 18:36; the last Tunbridge Wells–Eastbourne steam service was on 14 June.

After a delay of more than eighteen months, the Labour Minister of Transport, Barbara Castle, announced in September 1966 that the line from Three Bridges to Groombridge would close. Despite the outrage provoked by this decision, she refused to meet with a deputation from East Grinstead Urban District Council which was told that it was impossible for the Minister to withdraw her irrevocable consent to closure. No reference was made to the objections raised at the public enquiry, nor to the construction of 3000 houses near Crawley Down or the growing traffic congestion in East Grinstead. The decision had also been taken on the basis of figures drawn from when the line was worked by steam locomotives, the losses would presumably have been smaller with the new diesel units. Finally, it was still clear that the Three Bridges–East Grinstead section was well-used during peak-hour periods.

Some additional bus services were laid on for Monday-Friday peak periods, notably route 438a calling at East Grinstead, Felbridge, Crawley Down and Three Bridges. Existing bus services at other times proved slow and indirect, and became little used with people preferring to buy a car instead.

=== Final days ===
Sunday 1 January 1967 marked the last day of operation. Station furniture and other removable items were collected in the morning by an engineers' special hauled by locomotive No. D6529. The last service from Three Bridges was the 22:08 working to Tunbridge Wells equipped with three extra cars. On the Three Bridges station platform members of the Copthorne Silver Band played for around ten minutes while the train waited. The band also saw out the last train over the Forest Row section, the 22:09 Victoria to Tunbridge Wells West service.

From 2 January no further trains used East Grinstead High Level or the St Margaret's Loop and goods spur so these were closed, together with the goods yard whose freight facilities were withdrawn from 10 April. Lifting of the track began in late 1967.

The short spur line between Ashurst Jn and Groombridge carried a couple of passenger trains per day between Oxted and Tunbridge Wells until closure in January 1969.

=== Attempted revival ===
In 1967 an attempt was made to run the Three Bridges–East Grinstead section using a light diesel railcar. However, little interest was shown in this and the idea soon faded away.

== The line today ==
=== Three Bridges to Ashurst Junction ===
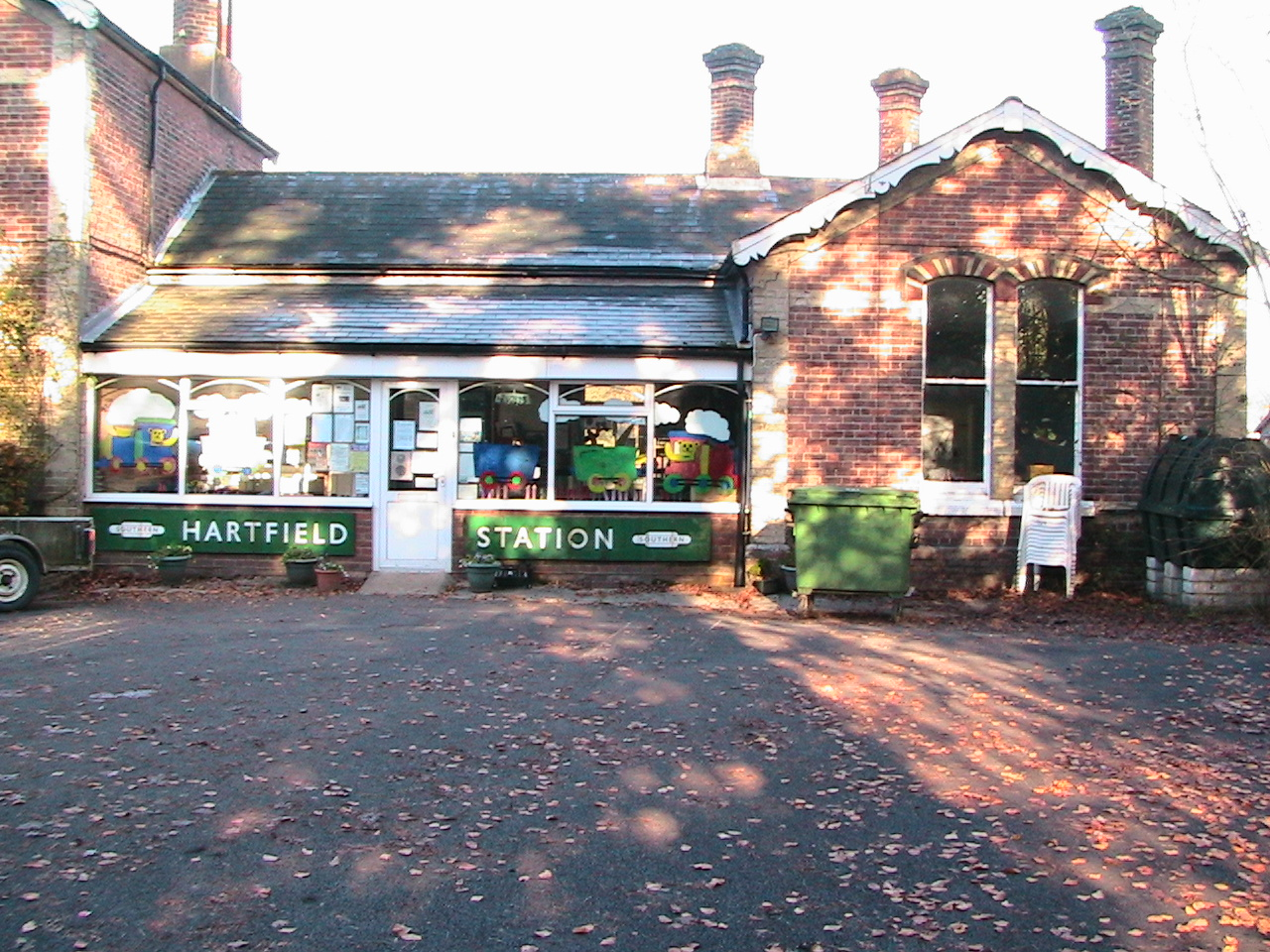
Hartfield station

Following the closure the various station buildings were sold off and in some cases swept away. This was the fate of Grange Road, the site of which is now covered by shops and housing, and by Forest Row which was sold to a club for £4,000, and is now part of a light industrial development. The redundant East Grinstead High Level station was demolished by BR in 1970, it had been used by passengers as a short-cut to the Low Level station and, following passenger complaints, BR was obliged to provide a footbridge to reinstate the short-cut.

The trackbed to the east of Station Road in East Grinstead to the Lewes Road tunnel was taken over by the A22 road as a relief road, with the two tunnels being opened out. The station's goods yard area was also used for the A22 which carved a path running parallel with Railway Approach. This required the removal of the locomotive shed which was demolished in 1976 despite the efforts of the East Grinstead Society which had attempted to raise funds for its preservation as a drama and arts workshop.

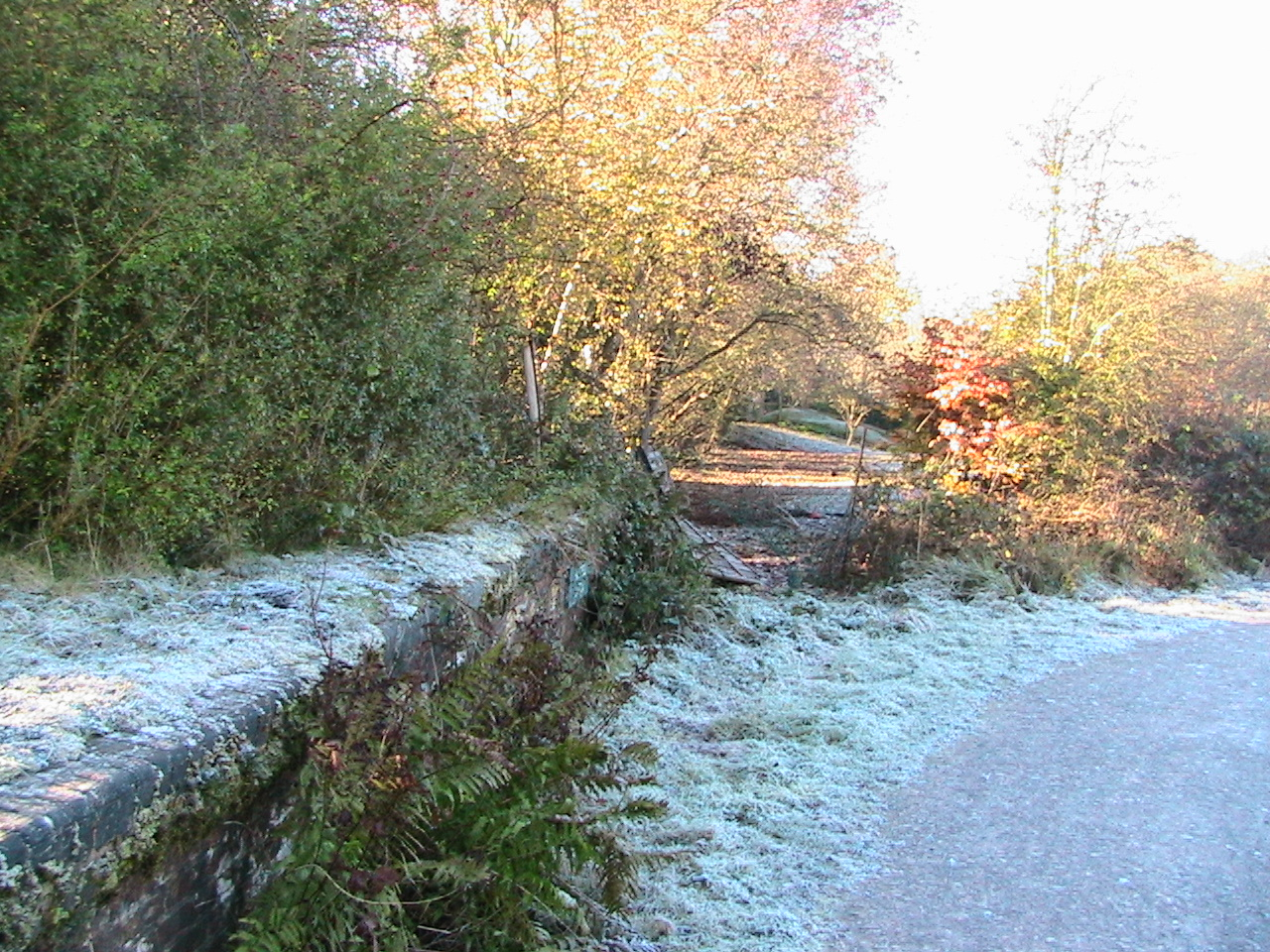
Hartfield station platforms on the Forest Way

The site of St Margaret's Loop is now a designated Site of Nature Conservation Importance having developed into a natural woodland and wildlife corridor containing many mature trees and, due to its inaccessibility, is a largely undisturbed home to a prolific bird and wildlife population.

On 10 July 1979 the section between Three Bridges and East Grinstead was opened as a public footpath and cycleway known as the Worth Way. In 2006 Mid-Sussex District Council floated the idea of constructing a 62-foot (19 m) wide concrete tunnel under the trail carrying a relief road for East Grinstead over the line of the trail. This scheme was shelved in 2007 when its estimated costs of £157m (representing £60,000 per East Grinstead dwelling) made it unviable.

Linking with the Worth Way at East Grinstead is the "Forest Way", another public footpath and cycleway opened in 1974 which runs as far as Groombridge. Hartfield station has now been converted to a children's nursery. Withyham station is now a private house.

=== Groombridge to Tunbridge Wells ===
==== Closure ====
1985 Closure Notice

The line from Groombridge to Tunbridge Wells West remained open until 1985, although in its latter years passenger services were confined to a shuttle service between Tonbridge via the single line connection to Tunbridge Wells Central and Eridge, although the station's depot provided rolling stock for services on the Uckfield and East Grinstead–London (via East Croydon) lines meaning there were plenty of empty stock moves early and late in the day.

Following a total lack of investment for decades, by the early 1980s the track and signalling needed to be replaced. British Rail, at the time carrying out an upgrade of the Tonbridge to Hastings Line which planned the removal of Grove Junction, decided that the costs of keeping the line from Eridge to the Central station open and undertaking the works, some £175,000, did not justify the outlay. It therefore announced the proposed closure of the line (including Groombridge and the West station) from 16 May 1983. However this was deferred following objections. The Secretary of State for Transport rubber stamped the decision and passenger services ceased from 6 July 1985 and the section from Grove Jn to Tunbridge Wells West was closed completely. The section between Tunbridge Wells West and Birchden Jn was used for empty stock trains until 10 August when the depot at the West station was shut.

==== Re-opening ====
A charitable society was formed on 13 September 1985 to purchase and reopen the Tunbridge Wells to Eridge line. Named the "Tunbridge Wells and Eridge Railway Preservation Society" (TWERPS), it began a long struggle to re-open the Tunbridge Wells West to Eridge line. In 1996, the group acquired the line from Tunbridge Wells West to Birchden Jn and established their base in the West station's locomotive shed. TWERPS subsequently merged with the North Downs Steam Railway at Dartford, to become the Spa Valley Railway.

The campaign received a setback in the late 1980s when Tunbridge Wells Borough Council granted planning permission for a supermarket on the site of the now derelict goods yard. While the 1891 locomotive shed and station building were protected as listed buildings, the remaining area of the site was obliterated, including the goods shed and signalboxes. However, the planning permission was subject to the condition that the developer pay for restoration of the station building and engine shed.

In 1996 the North Downs Steam Railway relocated from Dartford, where it was experiencing vandalism problems, to the Spa Valley Railway. It established a base in the locomotive shed alongside which a new platform was built from where services began running for about half a mile in December 1996 . Services were extended to Groombridge in August 1997 and High Rocks station opened in 1998.

In 2007 Spa Valley Railway marked the tenth anniversary of the re-opening of the line by transforming Groombridge into a busy interchange station with trains arriving or departing every 15 minutes. The funds raised from this event went towards the "Return to Eridge" appeal to raise £500,000 for the extension to the Uckfield mainline at Eridge. The heritage railway opened the line to Eridge in 2011.

==== Transport priorities ====
When the Mid Sussex District Council carried out a preliminary study before putting together an Area Action Plan, it conducted an enquiry into public transport which threw up some interesting results. Based on a survey of over 1,000 local residents, the Council acknowledged that most felt public transport facilities in East Grinstead to be inadequate. Local residents called for the introduction of dedicated bus lanes and more frequent rail services; some called for the reinstatement of the link to Three Bridges in order to provide easier access to Gatwick Airport, together with another link to Forest Row and Uckfield.

Replying to these suggestions, the Council noted that whilst "reinstatement of public transport services along Worth Way was the most common suggestion made", the only means of transport it would consider along that corridor would be a relief road. As mentioned above, this suggestion provoked outrage among local residents and was withdrawn. Nevertheless, the Council rebutted other public transport suggestions. Trams, it argued, are unsuitable as they "are generally used for solving urban problems where origins and destinations are contained within a specified area". As for a new railway line, this was evidently out of the question: "Improvements to rail services to London have recently been introduced by Southern Railways and it is doubtful that further service improvements could be achieved in the short term."

On 25 July 2007 the Council agreed a mixed development of 2,500 homes would be constructed to the west and south west of East Grinstead. To facilitate this development a "comprehensive transport package" was agreed which entailed an A264 to A22 relief road. No reference was made rail connections.

==== Future and Railway Preservation ====
In the event of a decision to re-open the section, the main obstacles that would stand in the way of the line following its original course would be the developments which have taken place along the line since its closure. At Forest Row, a fire station, community centre and other industrial units have been built on the site, the Grange Road station has been flattened and redeveloped with housing and shops. The East Grinstead A22 bypass, named "Beeching Way" after Dr Beeching, has taken one mile of the trackbed and the East Grinstead High Level station has been demolished. The M23 motorway cuts across the trackbed at Rowfant. At Three Bridges a Panel Signal Box is built on the site of the old junction with the Brighton Main Line. In Tunbridge Wells, although the original West station remains (now an American style restaurant), a large supermarket, petrol station and home improvement store now sit on the site of the old goods yard. The supermarket delivery yard and a coach park obstruct the original route.

== See also ==
- List of closed railway stations in Britain
