= Imberhorne Viaduct =

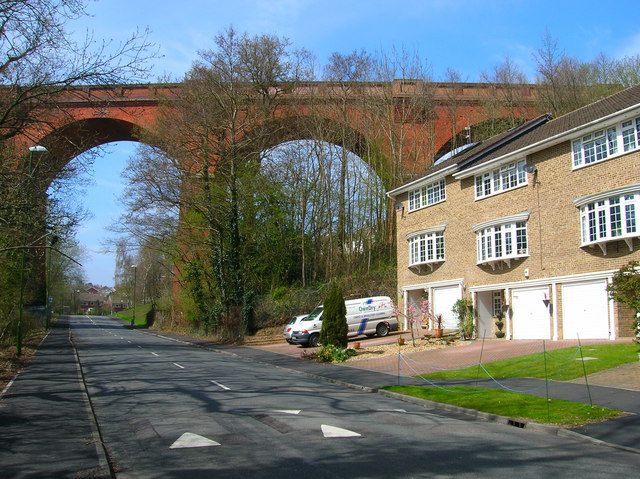
- Coordinates: 51°07′23″N 0°01′24″W
- Carries: Bluebell Railway
- Locale: East Grinstead, West Sussex, South-East England
- Other name: Hill Place Viaduct
- Heritage status: Grade II listed

Characteristics
- Total length: 700 feet (210 m)
- Height: 90 feet (27 m)

Rail characteristics
- No. of tracks: 1
- Track gauge: 4 ft 8 1/2 in (1,435 mm)

History
- Constructed by: Lewes and East Grinstead Railway
- Construction start: 1880
- Opened: 1882
- Rebuilt: 1992

Statistics
- Daily traffic: heritage railway

Location
- Interactive map of Imberhorne Viaduct

Imberhorne Viaduct is a Grade II listed railway viaduct located in East Grinstead, West Sussex, South-East England. Closed in 1958, the structure was brought back into use as part of the preserved Bluebell Railway heritage line in 2013, allowing trains to continue to East Grinstead railway station.

== Construction and operation ==
Built to span the lands of Imberhorne Farm, it was designed and engineered by Frederick Banister, then Chief Engineer for the London, Brighton and South Coast Railway. Built as part of the Lewes and East Grinstead Railway and built to allow double-track operations, it is 700 feet (210 m) in length and spanning the valley at a maximum height of 90 feet (27 m). Construction started in 1880, with ten brick arches each with a span of 60 feet (18 m) reaching a maximum height of 70 feet (21 m), each having no fewer than eight rings. The parapets have five panels above each arch, and there are brick string courses below. The imposts are stone on the face of the piers, but brick within the arches.

Opened in 1882, and also known as Hill Place Viaduct, it carried the Lewes and East Grinstead Railway south from East Grinstead to Kingscote, and onwards to Lewes.

== Closure and listing ==
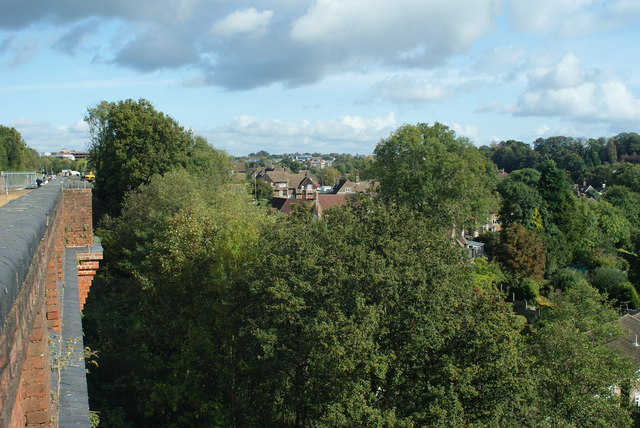
View from the viaduct, looking north towards East Grinstead

After the closure of the Lewes and East Grinstead Line south from East Grinstead in 1958, the track on the viaduct remained in place to allow the stabling of carriages. Imberhorne cutting located south of the viaduct was designated as a domestic rubbish dump, and infilled with waste during the 1970s. After various local residents requested the demolition of the decaying viaduct, the structure was listed from 15 September 1988.

== Reopening ==
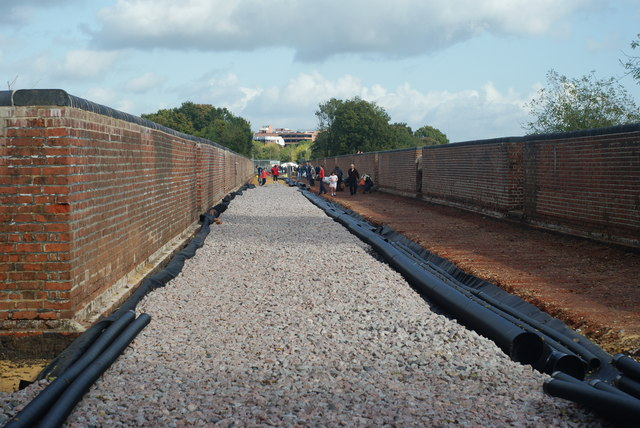
Looking north across the viaduct towards East Grinstead station, 2009. Renovation being undertaken to allow the relaying of track for the removal of domestic waste from Imberhorne cutting. Repairs have been made to the brickwork of the viaduct, with waterproof membrane and ballast laid about half way across. 2009

In 1992, after British Rail had closed the carriage sidings and undertaken required emergency repair work to the whole structure, the viaduct was donated to the Bluebell Railway Preservation Society. Further renovation was undertaken subsequently, including waterproofing the deck, brickwork repairs and repointing.

After reaching Kingscote in 1994, the Bluebell Railway Society undertook renovation of the section to reconnect the line with East Grinstead. After negotiation with the council over sharing the costs of removing accumulated rubbish from Imberhorne cutting, the Society relaid track across the viaduct south to allow removal of the rubbish north via Network Rail, to be reburied in Oxfordshire.

On 7 March 2013 the Bluebell Railway was reconnected with East Grinstead and the viaduct is now in regular use for passenger trains. The first scheduled service ran across the viaduct on 23 March 2013, following 55 years of disuse.

== Television appearance ==
Imberhorne Viaduct was used during the filming of the Foyle's War episode The Russian House. At the beginning of the episode, an escaped prisoner of war is running from the East Grinstead end of the viaduct. Once surrounded, he then leaps from the bridge.

The Viaduct appears in the Mercedes Benz Smart Forfour advert. The car-train hybrid is shown driving over the viaduct using the rail line, now owned by the Bluebell Railway.
