= East Grinstead railway station =

Railway station in West Sussex, England

East Grinstead
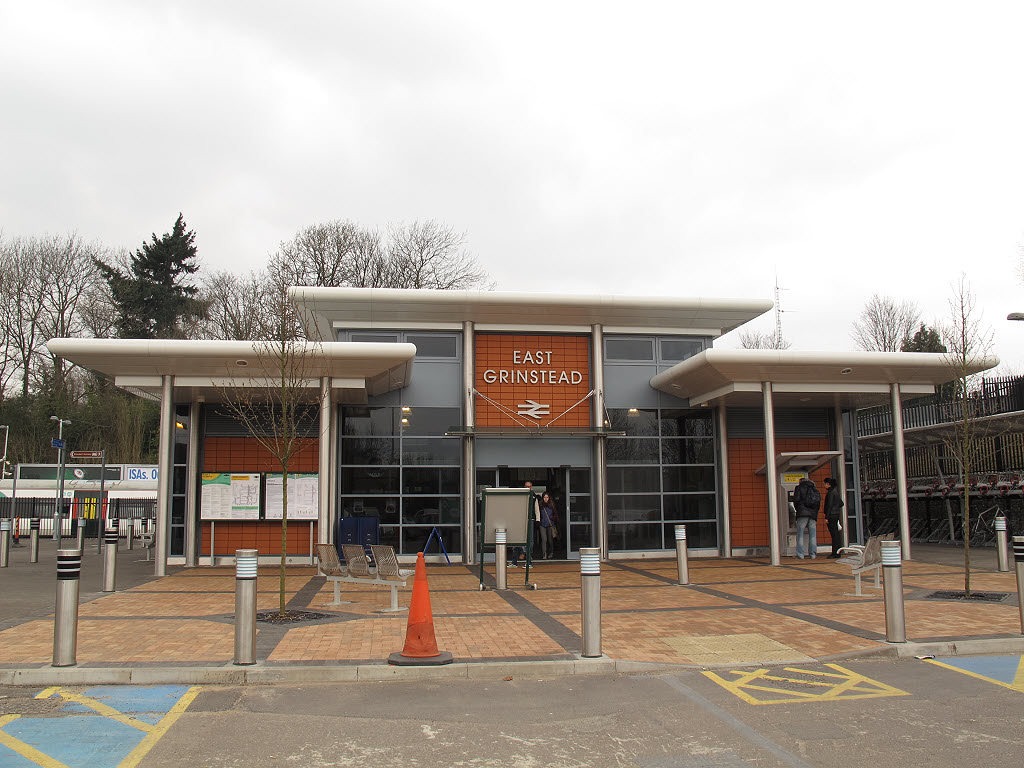

General information
- Location: East Grinstead, West Sussex, England
- Coordinates: 51°07′34″N 0°01′05″W
- Grid reference: TQ388382
- Manager: Southern
- Platforms: 2

Other information
- Station code: EGR
- Classification: DfT category C1

Key dates
- 1 August 1882: Present station opened as East Grinstead Low Level
- 1970: Renamed East Grinstead and station rebuilt
- 2013: Station rebuilt again and Bluebell Railway restores connection to station

Passengers
- 2020/21: ▼0.257 million
- 2021/22: ▲0.711 million
- 2022/23: ▲0.889 million
- 2023/24: ▲1.019 million
- 2023/24: ▲1.100 million
Location
Notes
- Passenger statistics from the Office of Rail and Road

East Grinstead railway station is one of the two southern termini of the Oxted line in the south of England and serves East Grinstead in West Sussex. It is 30 miles 4 chains (30.05 miles, 48.36 km) from London Bridge, although trains mostly run to and from London Victoria. The station is managed by Southern.

The station was formerly divided into two levels: the lower-level platforms being used by services from the Oxted line and the East Grinstead to Lewes Line, whilst the higher-level platforms served the Three Bridges to Tunbridge Wells Central Line and was also used by services from the Oxted line running through to Tunbridge Wells West.

Only the lower-level platforms remain open today, the high level having closed in 1967 with the Three Bridges to Ashurst Junction line as part of the closure programme proposed by the Beeching Report. A third low-level platform has been constructed at the south of the station by the Bluebell Railway. Bluebell services began running south to Sheffield Park in 2013.

== Low Level ==
The current East Grinstead station is the fourth to have been constructed in the town. Prior to the arrival of the railway, the nearest stations were 6 miles (9.7 km) away at Godstone on the South Eastern Railway's Redhill to Tonbridge line and at Three Bridges on the London, Brighton and South Coast Railway's Brighton line.

=== Early stations ===
==== 1855 station ====
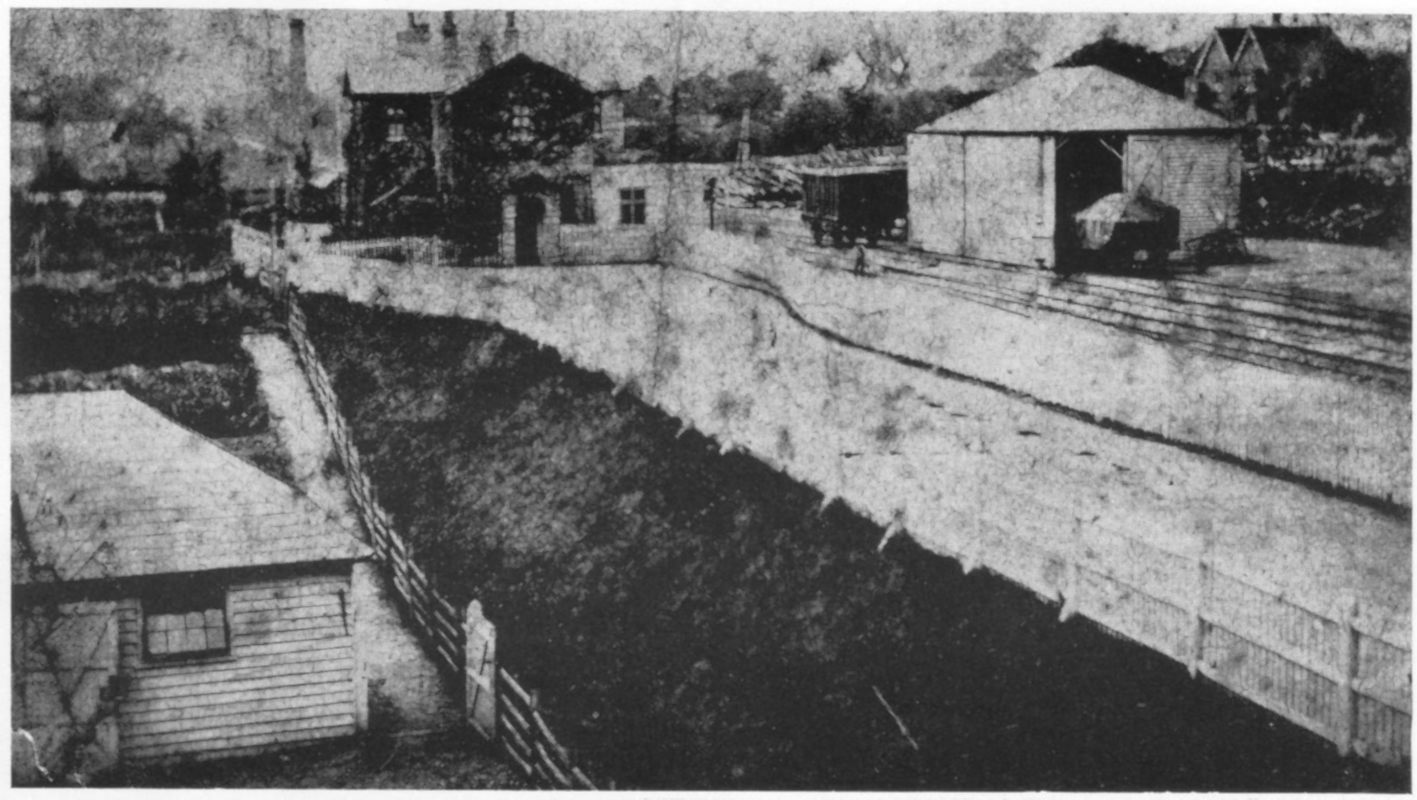
The 1855 station before its 1882 rebuilding

The first station to serve East Grinstead was built by the East Grinstead Railway as the terminus of its 6-mile-67-chain (11.0-kilometre) single-track line from Three Bridges. It was opened on 9 July 1855 in Swan Mead off the London Road, well-situated for the town centre, with the first train out at 12:12 pm. Constructed at a cost of £3,000, the station comprised a sandstone main building which survives to this day, as well as timber goods and engine sheds with slate roofs. The goods facilities were described in a specification as being equal to those at Hailsham railway station. There were probably two platform faces and the goods yard was on the up side. The first stationmaster was a Peter Nesbitt; he remained in post until his death on 10 September 1864. The initial passenger service consisted of six trains each way daily and two on Sundays; trains started and finished at East Grinstead. The service appears to have exceeded expectations as the service increased to nine each way on weekdays, with three on Sundays. So well-patronised were the Sunday services that Reverend Woodington, the curate of East Grinstead, regularly visited the station to distribute religious tracts requesting passengers to "listen to the church bells instead of the railway bells."

The journey time to Three Bridges was 20 minutes and the first train departed at 6:55 am for arrival in London at 9:15 am after a 43-minute wait at Three Bridges for a connecting service via the Brighton main line. The fastest time to London was 1 1/4 hours achieved by the 4:00 pm down train which was first-class only. As from September 1855, an additional mid-afternoon train was provided each way. This was increased to nine each way by 1862. The rail fare from East Grinstead to London was 6s first class and 3s third class. The line was operated from its outset by the London, Brighton and South Coast Railway for an annual rental of £2,000 until January 1865, when it purchased the East Grinstead Railway.

==== 1866 station ====
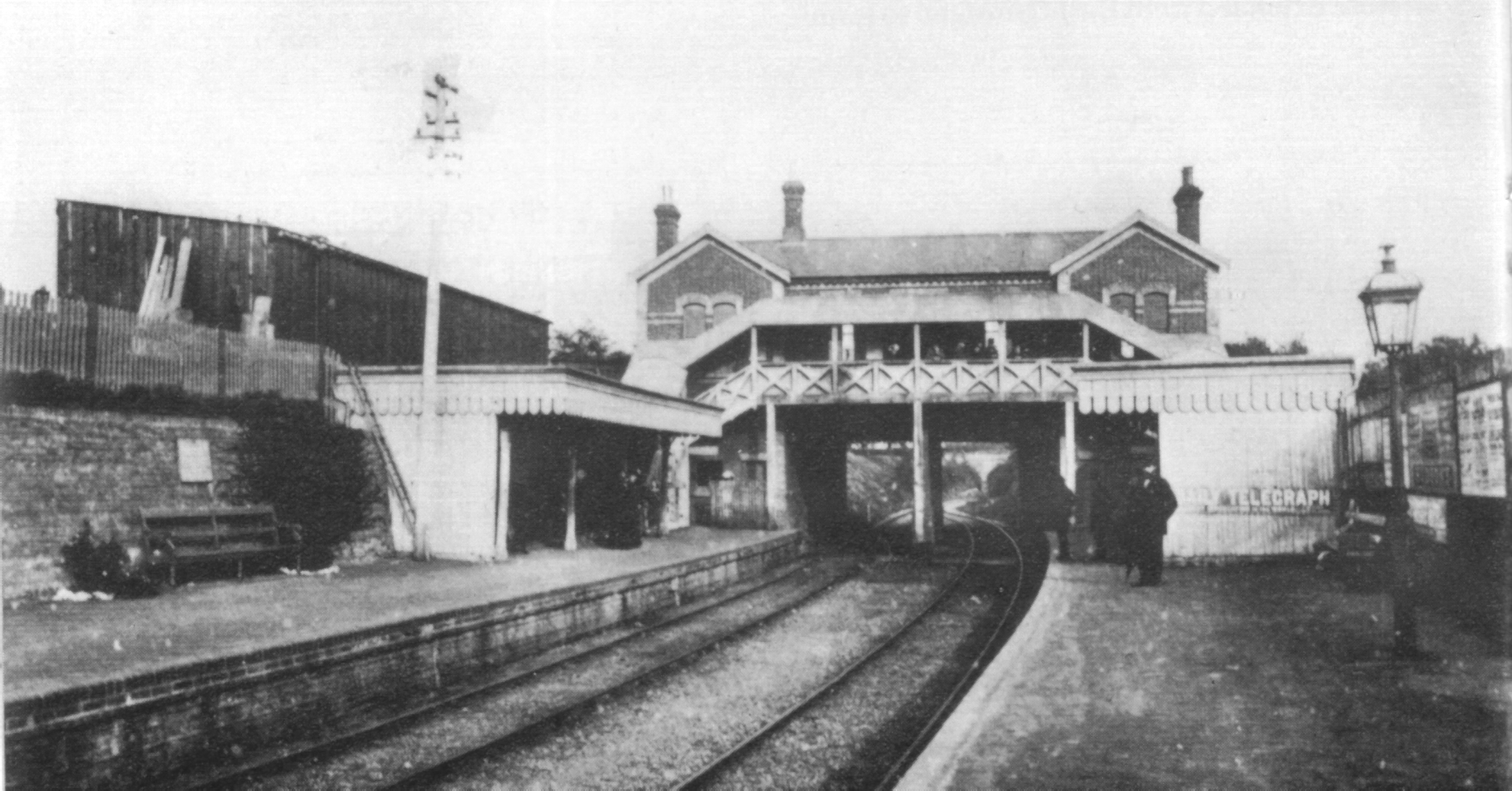
1866 station

In August 1862 legal powers were obtained in the East Grinstead, Groombridge and Tunbridge Wells Railway Act 1862 (25 & 26 Vict. c. ccvii) for the 13.5-mile (21.7 km) extension of the line to Tunbridge Wells West via Groombridge, with the new line forming an end-on junction with the Three Bridges line at East Grinstead. The extension required East Grinstead station to be relocated a few yards north at a lower level in a cutting immediately to the west of the London Road at TQ392383 in order to allow the line to pass under the highway. It was reached by steps from the road by the bridge. During construction, the Surveyor of Highways of the Parish of East Grinstead complained to the Board of Trade that the station approaches were "inconvenient and dangerous" and that the road entrance for carriages was situated on the narrow bridge over the line. Whilst the Board of Trade agreed that the layout was not ideal, it did not order any alterations save for the carriage access to the booking hall which it felt was cramped and should be modified "as soon as there are any complaints of horses [which brought carriages to the station] being frightened by the steam and smoke of the locomotives which will come through the present opening between the overbridge and the station."

The station building straddled the double track with basements at platform level which contained the stationmaster's office and porter's room. A large brick goods shed replaced the previous timber structure, whilst the site of the old station became a goods yard. The new station was opened for traffic on 1 October 1866, and the old one closed the same day. The initial passenger service was poor, with only six trains each way and the withdrawal of three East Grinstead to Three Bridges services. Journey time to Tunbridge Wells was just under an hour. In 1869 annual season tickets to London were £32 first class and £24 second class, while returns were 9s 6d first, 7s 6d second and 4s 8d third.

=== 1882 rebuilding ===
A third re-modelling of East Grinstead station was made necessary by the arrival in the town of two lines: the Lewes and East Grinstead Railway (L&EG) from the south on 1 August 1882, followed by the Croydon, Oxted and East Grinstead Railway (CO&EG) from the north on 10 March 1884. The L&EG would approach the Three Bridges line from the south at a right-angle and the CO&EG would make an end-on junction with it. It was not possible to enlarge the 1866 station to accommodate the new lines and arrange the new station in the form of a Mitcham Junction or Polegate as this would have meant purchasing the adjoining timber yard, which the LB&SCR was not prepared to do. It was therefore decided to build a new station around 300 yards (270 m) to the west which would be arranged on two levels. The main buildings were on the low level platform.

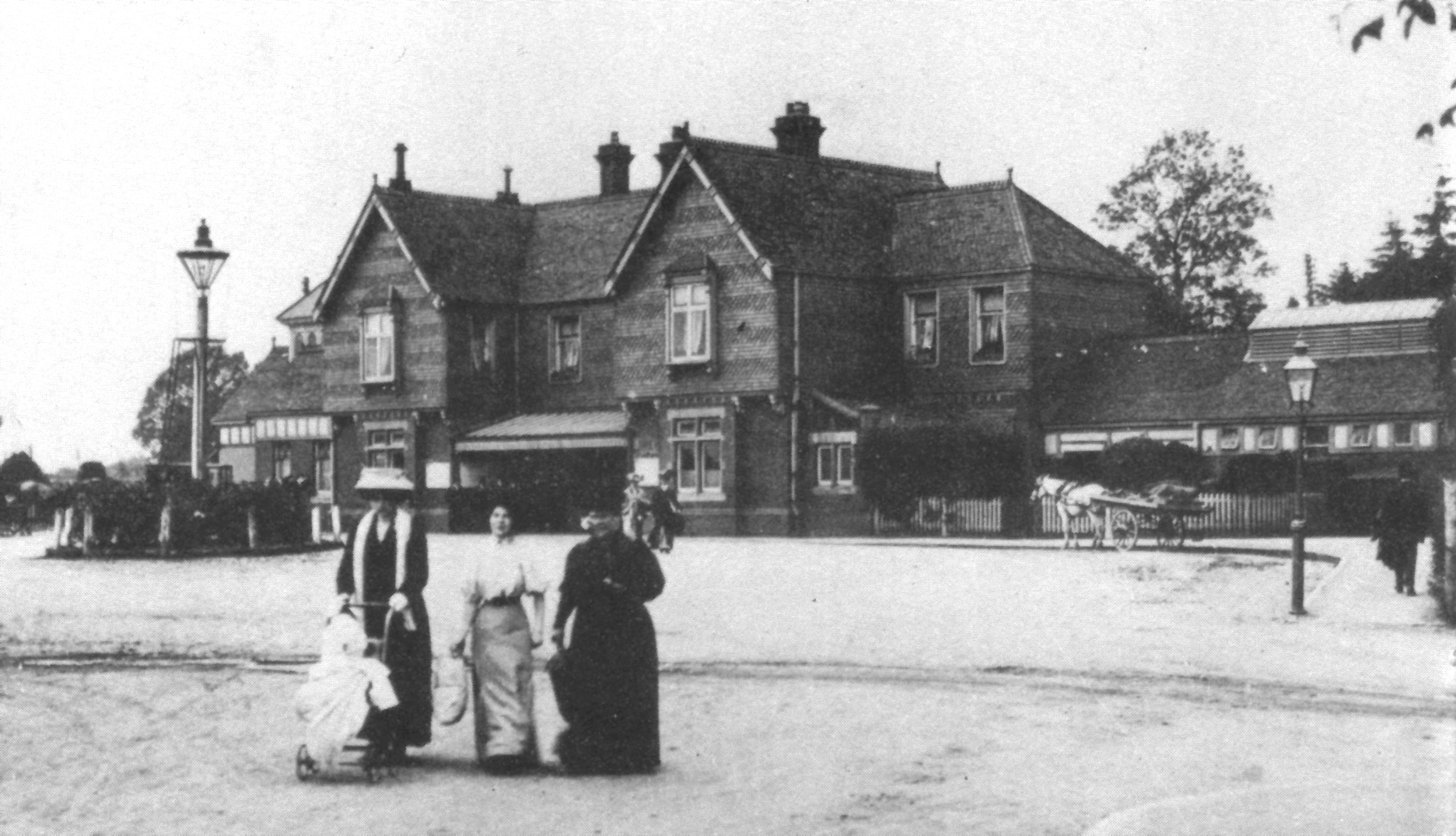
1883 station designed by Thomas Myres

The low level station was set at a right-angle to the high level and it had two platforms to serve the L&EG and CO&EG. From the L&EG's opening on 1 August 1882 until 14 October 1883, services continued to use the 1866 station as the new station was still in construction and because residents found the older station more convenient for the town centre. On 15 October 1883 both high and low level stations opened and the 1866 station was closed. The old station was later demolished in February 1908 and sold for scrap for £15. The bridge over the London Road was demolished in 1978 with the construction of the Inner Relief Road. The CO&EG opened for traffic on 10 March 1884 with a service of four trains each way between Brighton and London Bridge via Oxted, plus four South Eastern services each way between London Bridge and Oxted. The new line to London was 6 miles (9.7 kilometres) shorter than the route via Three Bridges but some passengers continued to use the old line for the fast services from Three Bridges.

The main station building was built in the architectural style of other stations on the L&EG: an upper timber storey with plaster infill which was later covered with hung tiles with impressed flower patterns. The architect was Thomas Myres, the inspiration behind what was termed the Queen Anne School, who prepared the design of the other stations on the L&EG, as well as those on the Chichester to Midhurst and Eridge to Polegate branches. It was a substantial structure with refreshment rooms on both levels, with that on the low level said to house a billiards room for travellers. Only passengers with valid tickets and railway staff had access to the rooms, which were licensed to sell alcohol and managed by the former owner of East Grinstead's Crown Hotel. The East Grinstead Parish Magazine complained of the distance from the new stations to the town and hoped that new roads would be built to connect it and the approaches improved. An 1885 publication about East Grinstead described the station as "very commodious and convenient" and "a pleasing object" with "embankments on the outside planted with shrubs and flowers".

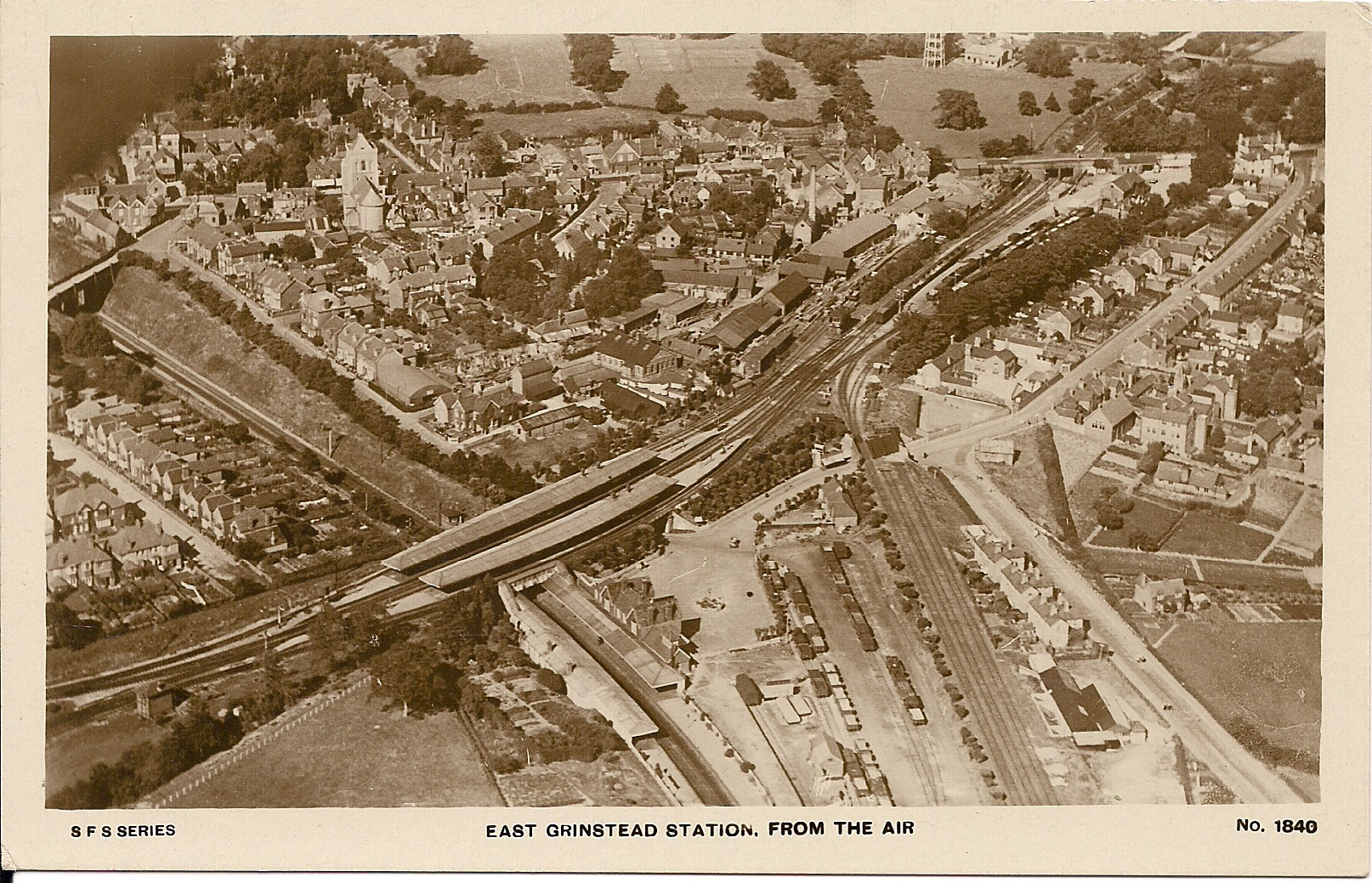
Aerial view c1925.

It is thought that an engine shed was provided upon the opening of the L&EG, given that as the first train of the day started at East Grinstead and the last train terminated there, there would have been a need to house the engine. However, the exact date of the shed's opening is unknown. Records show that LB&SCR D1 class No. 233 Handcross was allocated to East Grinstead shed when new in March 1883. The shed closed at the end of 1894; there were by now sheds at Three Bridges and Tunbridge Wells West. However, station plans from 1910 show that the water tank, water column and engine pit still remained. The station had north and south signal boxes; the north box was occasionally used to operate a crossover to the north but operation was transferred to the south box in the 1920s which was operational until 17 July 1987. The box has since been demolished and the line is worked from the Oxted signalling panel.

=== 1970 rebuilding ===
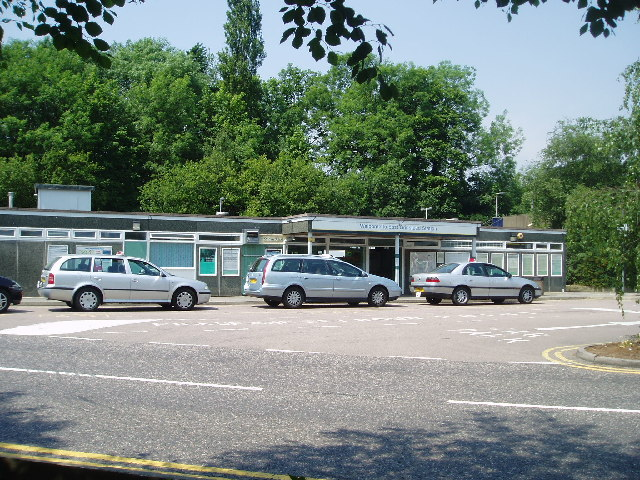
1972 CLASP station

From 1955, the low level station fell into virtual disuse with most passengers using the high level station. The L&EG closed on 16 March 1958 and for a short time afterwards a faster service to Brighton via Three Bridges ran which reached the coastal town in 45 minutes after leaving East Grinstead. The last train on the L&EG ran on 16 March 1958 after which very few trains used the down platform and none departed from the up. The Oxted line timetable was revised as from 6 January 1964 so that, with a few exceptions, the regular services from Victoria terminated at the low-level platforms. After the closure of the Three Bridges-Ashurst Junction line on 2 January 1967, all London trains used the low level with the up platform used for services during busy periods, leaving the down platform to deal with both arrivals and departures.

Demolition works on the 1882 building started in February 1970 and were complete by November 1971; the replacement single-storey prefabricated CLASP structure opened in 1972 immediately south of the old building. Contractors for the demolition and reconstruction were J. Longley of Crawley. The smaller modern construction which reflected the station's new status as the terminus of a branch line from Oxted. Several fittings from the old station, including cast-iron pillars and brackets, valancing, gas lamps, nameboards and coloured glass, were sold to a Californian restaurant owner, Robert Freeman. The sidings in the low level goods yard remained until their removal in 1987. Following the closure of the high level station, the "Low Level" suffix was no longer used. A concrete footbridge was erected in 1970 to link the two platforms as the demolition of the high level station had removed the means of access to the up platform. The Oxted line was electrified following works between May 1986 and October 1987 and the track layout in the station was modified. The platforms were also lengthened to take eight-car trains.

=== 2013 rebuilding ===
By September 2012, a new station building costing £2.1 million had been erected next to the existing structure which was scheduled for demolition in March 2013 once the new building and expanded car park became fully operational. The works, which were completed as part of the Department for Transport’s National Station Improvement Programme, also included new platform waiting shelters, bicycle facilities, a new transport interchange on the site of the old building, platform lengthening to accommodate 12-car trains and the installation of a pre-fabricated single deck on the car park to increase capacity from 236 to 336 spaces. It was designed by Howard Fairbairn MHK Architects.

The existing station building was considered no longer fit for purpose and in need of replacement. A grant had been applied for to cover the cost of installing access lifts to Platform 1 and 2, but this was refused by the Department for Transport on the basis that the cost would be disproportionate given the likely passenger numbers and the fact that only six trains a day would use the platform.

The station building first opened on 17 December 2012, with the official opening taking place on 8 March 2013 in the presence of the East Grinstead Town Mayor, Liz Bennett, and the Mid Sussex MP, Nicholas Soames.

=== Further improvements ===
The station gained step-free access in September 2022 when the old footbridge was replaced with a new larger footbridge and two 16-person capacity lifts.

== Facilities ==
The station has a booking hall with a ticket office and ticket machine, a kiosk, toilets, car park, bicycle storage and a taxi rank.

== Services ==
=== Present day ===
Off-peak, all services at East Grinstead are operated by Southern using Class 377 EMUs.

The typical off-peak service is two trains per hour to London Victoria via Oxted, calling at all stations as far as Sanderstead then East Croydon and Clapham Junction. During the middle of the day Mondays to Wednesdays, this service is reduced to one train per hour.

During the peak hours, there are also Thameslink operated services to London Bridge and Bedford. These services are operated using Class 700 EMUs.

Preceding station	National Rail	Following station
Dormans	Southern Oxted Line East Grinstead Branch	Terminus
Dormans	Thameslink Bedford to East Grinstead Peak Hours Only	Terminus
Preceding station	Heritage railways	Following station
Terminus	Bluebell Railway	Kingscote towards Sheffield Park
	Historical railways	
Dormans Line and station open	London, Brighton and South Coast Railway Lewes and East Grinstead Railway	Kingscote Line and station open
	Disused railways	
Grange Road Line and station closed	British Rail; Southern Region Three Bridges to Tunbridge Wells Central Line	Forest Row Line and station closed

=== Historical ===
Throughout its railway history, East Grinstead has been almost exclusively served by local services to London, Brighton, Three Bridges and Tunbridge Wells. In the early days, around five or six trains a day on weekdays and two on Sundays were operated. The number of trains increased gradually as commuting developed from the 1890s, exception made for cutbacks as a result of the First World War. Starting in 1888 until the electrification of the Brighton main line in 1932, coaches for East Grinstead and Forest Row were attached to the 5:05 pm express from London Bridge to Eastbourne via Lewes and were slipped at Horley to be routed via the Three Bridges to Tunbridge Wells line. A handful of through services between London and Brighton called at East Grinstead before running via Oxted, Horsted Keynes and Lewes. These were not fast services, taking 45 minutes to reach the coast in the 1930s. Through workings between East Grinstead, Three Bridges and London ceased upon electrification of the Brighton main line in 1932, leaving the line from Three Bridges to be worked as a separate section with push-pull trains.

By 1938, eight commuter services departed East Grinstead between 6:30 am and 9:30 am on weekdays, an increase of three when compared with 1923. Sunday services remained infrequent at no more than four each way on each of the lines serving the town. Electrification of the Oxted line as far as Horsted Keynes was considered by the Southern Railway in 1939 but the outbreak of the Second World War put an end to any plans. Fuel shortages and wartime needs in the early 1940s resulted in services being reduced to their lowest level in the 20th century with only 45 trains scheduled to leave the station on weekdays. Wide gaps developed between services with, for example, only one train in 1942 to Lewes between 9:37 am and 3:00 pm, one to Three Bridges between 9:23 am and 1:52 pm and one to Tunbridge Wells from 9:33 am and 2:25 pm. Services on the Oxted line were also cut back from eight to five daily morning commuter trains and from 20 to 15 trains daily. By 1952, services had still not reached their pre-war frequency with the exception of the London commuter service.

In 1955, the Oxted line timetable was recast to provide an hourly service outside the peaks, supported by an intricate system of connections between them. After the morning peak which saw eight services to London Victoria and London Bridge between 6:30 am and 9:37 am, a Victoria service ran at 25 minutes past each hour until 9:25 pm, with an extra London Bridge service at 5:55 pm carrying vans traffic. Sunday services were trebled to nine which ran at two-hourly intervals until 10:25 pm. Similar provision was made for services from London with departures at eight minutes past the hour from Victoria, continuing from East Grinstead to Groombridge and Tunbridge Wells West. Services were also increased on the Three Bridges line to 19 on weekdays and 15 on Sundays. These additional services may have contributed to a 40% growth in East Grinstead's population between 1951 and 1961, when it rose to 15,448. One of the popular early morning commuter trains in the 1950s was the 7:08 am service from Tunbridge Wells West to London Bridge via East Grinstead, while the 6:30 pm London Bridge to Forest Row service, formed of seven coaches, was also well-patronised. After the publication of the Beeching Report in 1963 which saw the Three Bridges line fall into the category of routes with less than 10,000 passengers a week thereby rendering it susceptible to closure, a new timetable was introduced from 6 January 1964 which removed most of the off-peak direct London services in favour of a two-hourly service to Three Bridges.

=== Motive power ===
Small tank engines were used to haul services until the 1870s when Stroudley D1s supplemented by B1 "Gladstones" were used after having been displaced from main-line duties. Heavier and more powerful engines were introduced after the First World War, including Billinton E4 and E5 classes, along with his D3 and B4 classes. Marsh's I3 class was mainly used on Tunbridge Wells-East Grinstead-London services, while his H1 and H2 "Atlantics" were seen on London-East Grinstead-Lewes services. The Southern Railway's neglect of its non-electrified secondary lines in the period leading up to the Second World War resulted in weight restrictions being introduced on the Tunbridge Wells and Lewes lines from which I3s were banned in favour of lighter I1X class locomotives to Tunbridge Wells and SECR B1s, F1s and D1s on the Lewes line. The restrictions were removed after the war when I3s returned with SR N and U1 classes, together with certain K classes. Larger express passenger engines began to appear including, in the mid-1950s, Schools class No. 30917 Ardingly for beginning and end of school term specials.

In the early 1950s, LMS Fairburn 2-6-4Ts were trialled on London commuter services and LMS Ivatt Class 2 2-6-2Ts for lighter Oxted line trains. In the last days of steam, BR 2-6-4Ts took up duties alongside the Fairburns until these were transferred to the London Midland Region. Dieselisation came in the early 1960s when Class 207 units were introduced on Oxted line services where they remained in operation for the next 43 years. On 18 June 1962, the first public diesel services started on the 7:41 am East Grinstead to London Bridge service, with the return at 5:37 pm; the formation was a 3-car set combined with a Hastings-type 6-car set. Steam working continued on the London services for a further twelve months, whilst the Three Bridges line was largely operated with M7 push-pull steam services. Push-pull working on the line ceased on 4 January 1964 just prior to the entry into force of a new timetable for the Oxted line from 6 January; the last push-pull service was hauled by H class No. 31263. Electrification reached East Grinstead in 1987 with the first services commencing on Monday 5 October.

== Connections ==
Metrobus routes 84, 270, 281, 291, 400, 409 and 485, and Compass Bus route 261 serve the station.

== Bluebell Railway ==
=== Site purchase ===
East Grinstead

General information
- Location: East Grinstead, District of Mid Sussex; England
- Grid reference: TQ387381
- System: Station on heritage railway
- Operator: Bluebell Railway
- Platforms: 1

Key dates
- 4 September 2010: Public opening
- 23 March 2013: Opening of line to Kingscote
Location

The heritage Bluebell Railway reopened part of the L&EG from Sheffield Park to just short of Horsted Keynes on 7 August 1960. Horsted Keynes was reached the next year and the site of West Hoathly was purchased in November 1975. A planning application for a light railway order to extend services north to East Grinstead led to a public enquiry in June 1983 and the grant of permission by the Secretary of State for the Environment on 2 April 1985, subject to conditions including the removal of waste from Imberhorne cutting. The first section of track of the northern extension was laid on 13 March 1988 by Paul Channon MP, Secretary of State for Transport. On 17 April 1992, the line was further extended through Sharpthorne Tunnel up to New Coombe Bridge (just north of site of West Hoathly station). On 23 April 1994, the first public service to call at Kingscote in 39 years ran following the completion of New Coombe Bridge.

In 1991, British Rail gave the Bluebell Railway an undertaking to sell it Hill Place Viaduct as well as land for a new station at East Grinstead; each would be sold for the sum of £1.00. On 8 September 1992, the viaduct was formally handed over to the Bluebell Extension Company. The proposed station site, which was located just south of the existing station, had been used for carriage storage sidings since closure of the line to Sheffield Park and Lewes. The site is large enough to accommodate an eight-car platform, basic station facilities and the necessary track and infrastructure.

Despite the understanding reached with British Rail, several attempts were made by neighbouring commercial interests to take over the site following its privatisation and the appearance of Railtrack. In April 1993, it was reported that the former goods yard had been sold by British Rail Property Board for £2.3m and that J Sainsbury plc would be constructing a supermarket on part of the land, with the rest to be used as a replacement car park in front of the station. In October 1995, J Sainsbury plc made a planning application for a petrol station on the season ticket holders' car park in front of the station, with the parking to be relocated to the intended station site. A further application was presented in March 1996 showing Sainsbury's intention to use part of the site itself. The applications were refused by Mid Sussex District Council on the basis that they affected the proposed Bluebell station. The Bluebell had turned down a proposal by consultants engaged by Railtrack for a single-platform terminus relocated 80 metres (87 yd) nearer Imberhorne Viaduct. In September 2002, Railtrack applied to the Office of the Rail Regulator to sell the land earmarked for the Bluebell Railway to Sainsbury's for an extension of the adjoining supermarket car park. In its application, Railtrack acknowledged that an undertaking had been given to sell the land to the Bluebell Railway, but indicated that in its opinion the extension of the line to East Grinstead would not materialise. Objections to the proposal were made by the Strategic Rail Authority, Southern and the various local authorities; the Bluebell Railway also objected and stated that it would make the East Grinstead extension unviable. Consent to the sale was refused by the Regulator. In 2006, Network Rail sold the station site to the Bluebell Railway.

=== Construction ===
Work began in May 2008 on clearing the site for the construction of a new platform. This was completed within two days and work started in November to prepare the site for tracklaying. On the night of 13 January 2009, Network Rail connected the track to the main line. A network of ducts was laid to enable the station to be signalled remotely from the Kingscote signalbox. Signalling will be controlled from Kingscote, although the Society will relocate an historic LB&SCR signalbox from Billingshurst.

To mark an open day on 17 January 2009, former South West Trains 4Vep unit no. 3417 (named Gordon Pettit after the last Southern Region manager) was moved to the station site. Presented to the Bluebell by South West Trains which had restored the unit to its original blue livery at Wimbledon depot, it became the first train to use the new connection between Network Rail and the Bluebell Railway at East Grinstead. It was shunted over the connection by Class 73 73205. The unit only remained on site for a few days as on 22 January it was moved to secure undercover storage at Eastleigh Works.

By July 2009, service pipes and a permanent messing facility had been installed on the site. Construction on the back wall of the platform began on 10 August 2009. All utilities and cabling had to be routed under or through the platform due to the long and thin shape of the plot. Tracklaying in the station area was complete by June 2010, following which the first train over the section carrying waste from Imberhorne cutting ran on 6 July. GB Railfreight (GBRf), which had been contracted to run occasional trains, ran the first of its services carrying 1,000 tons of excavated rubbish from Imberhorne Cutting to disposal sites, initially at Calvert. The total to be removed was some 90,981 tons, achieved by December 2011. The waste had been deposited in the 60-foot-deep (18 m) and quarter-mile-long (400 m) Hill Place Cutting which was purchased and designated as a landfill tip by East Grinstead Town Council in the late 1960s and used for around 25 years.

The station's layout is basic to allow trains arriving from the south to arrive directly in the platform so that the locomotive can detach, take water and return to the south end of the train via a run-round loop. Train movements in the station area are subject to a 10 miles per hour (16 km/h) speed restriction in order to reduce noise and smoke.

=== Opening ===
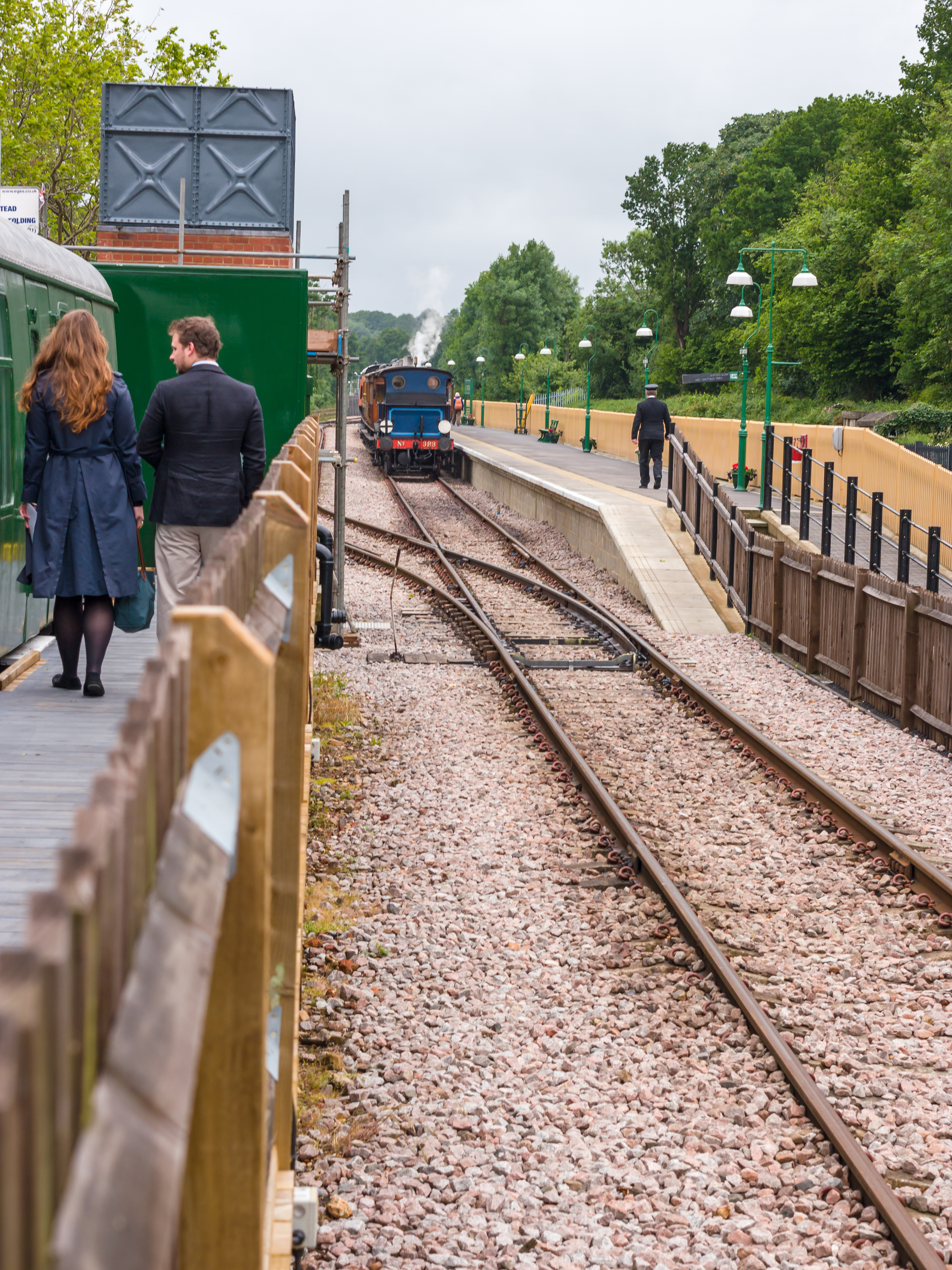
A Bluebell Railway heritage train arrives into the Bluebell's East Grinstead station platform, during the railway's 2013 Edwardian weekend. The two people on the left are walking along the heritage line's Observation platform. To the right, beyond the second fence where the guard is, is located the connecting line to Network Rail

The station first opened to the public on 4 September 2010 as part of an open day weekend. Class 73 73208 Kirsten broke through a ceremonial banner at the station on the day. A shuttle passenger service operated during the weekend for about 0.5 miles (0.80 km) to the north end of the infilled Hill Place Cutting. The first direct through service as far as the tip face ran on 6 November 2010, with a Class 201 No. 1001 preserved DEMU running a "Blue Belle" charter from Hastings through to Imberhorne North. It had been intended that the station should represent an authentic Southern Railway station from the 1930s with an art deco-style main building, with a single platform capable of accommodating eight coach trains complete with a run-round loop and a water tower. This plan was frustrated by Network Rail's need to access the land earmarked for the proposed building and it was therefore decided to use replicated LB&SCR lampposts, benches and signalling with Southern-style enamel signs in a Southern Region colour scheme to reflect how the 1882 East Grinstead station would have looked prior to demolition.

The Bluebell Railway commenced services to East Grinstead on 23 March 2013. The first service was the 9:45 am "The Pioneer" to Sheffield Park hauled by LB&SCR A1X class 55 Stepney. The first through service from London Victoria since September 1963 and the first service through to Sheffield Park since 1958, a 12-coach railtour worked by GBRf Class 66/7 66739, ran on 28 March 2013. Two GBRf Class 73s, 73207 and 73119, provided heating and also operated services between East Grinstead and Sheffield Park using the Bluebell's own rolling stock. In the year following the opening of the extension, the Bluebell's annual passenger figures rose from 60,000 to 250,000 and annual revenue increased by 25% to £4 million.

== High Level ==
=== Opening ===
East Grinstead High Level

General information
- Location: East Grinstead, District of Mid Sussex; England
- Grid reference: TQ388383
- Platforms: 4

Other information
- Status: Disused

History
- Pre-grouping: London, Brighton & South Coast Railway
- Post-grouping: Southern Railway; Southern Region of British Railways

Key dates
- 1 August 1882: Opened
- 2 January 1967: Closed to passengers
- 10 April 1967: Closed to goods
Location

The high level station was still in construction when it opened on 1 August 1882, the first day of service on the L&EG, and was initially only used by some Three Bridges to Tunbridge Wells services scheduled to connect with those on the L&EG. The new station was still not complete by March 1883 and a working timetable instruction advised locomotive drivers and guards to take care to ensure that their trains pulled up at the completed part of the high level platform. Until 14 October 1883, these trains called at the 1866 and the unfinished high level station where a temporary ticket box was opened. On 15 October 1883 the new high and low level stations were officially opened and the 1866 station was closed.

The high level station had two island platforms, curiously numbered 3 and 4 even though each platform had two faces, serving four tracks on the Three Bridges line, while below it a low level station set at a right-angle with two platforms to serve the L&EG and CO&EG. The southern island platform was situated between the two roads of the crossing loop of the Three Bridges line and the northern island platform was between the up and down lines of the St Margaret's Loop spur. Trains from Tunbridge Wells bound for Three Bridges could only be routed via the south face of platform 3, whilst those intended for the Oxted line ran from the south face of platform 4. In the other direction, trains from Three Bridges arrived at the north face of platform 3, whilst those from Oxted were routed via the north face of platform 4. To the east of the station, all running roads converged on the single track to Groombridge. The timber accommodation provided for the high level station was not as comfortable as that in the lower level station. It was, however, equipped with a refreshment room lit by a lantern roof on each platform, as well as two signal cabins on either side—East Grinstead West and East Grinstead East. The platforms were timber-planked where they passed above the low level tracks. The platforms were connected by western and eastern staircases; the western staircase fell out of use after 1891 when an overbridge linking the low level platforms was built. A private siding also led into the adjoining timber yard. The first train to call at the station was a 05:50 service from Three Bridges to Brighton via East Grinstead. In 1922, a water tower from Streatham Hill was installed at the eastern end of the station.

Following the opening of the CO&EG on 10 March 1884, a sharply curving 56-chain (1.1 km) spur line (later known as "St. Margaret's Loop") which entered the high level station from the CO&EG was also opened. This was a double-track connection from the west-end of the station on a tight curve which joined the CO&EG 0.5 miles (0.80 km) to the north of the town at St Margaret's Junction at TQ391390, named after a local Anglican convent. To ease the sharpness of the curve, the Three Bridges line was deviated on its western approach to the high level station. The deviation was completed in May 1882 and comprised two underbridges with brick abutments and wrought iron girders which would cross the new line and the new road which had to be built (Station Road). No regular service was booked to use the loop until October 1885. A single-track spur was also laid from the south of the low level station to the east of the high level to be used for shunting trains between the stations and turning engines; no scheduled services ever used it. As there was a shorter route from Lewes to Groombridge via Uckfield, there would have been no need for the spur. It had been proposed to construct a loop to the west of the high level station between St Margaret's Loop and the Three Bridges line to allow through running between the Oxted and Three Bridges lines but this was never realised.

=== Closure ===
The closure of the Three Bridges-Ashurst Junction line after the last train on Sunday 1 January 1967 spelt the end for the high level station and St Margaret's Loop which would receive no further traffic. The goods yard had been virtually closed for some time except for coal and all freight facilities were formally withdrawn as from 10 April. Although very nearly redundant, the high level goods sidings could still be accessed via the low to high level connecting spur; both spurs serving the high level station were however closed in 1967. The last train to use the station was in February 1968, a tracklifting train hauled by a Class 33 diesel locomotive. As the footbridge at the low-level platforms had been demolished in Summer 1965, passengers used the high level station as a short-cut between platforms, thereby avoiding the need to go around a local housing estate. The high level's demolition in 1970 led to protests from passengers at the loss of the short-cut, as a result of which British Rail erected a footbridge which today marks the site of the high level station.

The goods yard area was taken over by the A22 road which runs parallel with Railway Approach. The East Grinstead Society had attempted to save the brick goods shed for reuse as a drama and arts workshop but were unable to secure the necessary funds and so it was demolished in 1976. The site of the high level station is now a car park whose perimeter is marked out with old rails. Beyond the car park to the east, the former railway embankment has been removed to make way for the Inner Relief Road (A22 Beeching Way) which was opened in 1978. In July 1979, much of the trackbed from Three Bridges to East Grinstead became a footpath and cycleway known as the Worth Way.

== Future ==
The reopening of the line from Tunbridge Wells to Three Bridges has been suggested as a means of relieving the A264 road. However, a number of obstacles would appear to stand in the way of such action, most notably:

1. An industrial site currently occupies the former location of Forest Row railway station as well as a small recycling centre to the west.
2. The formation has been built across in several places notably in East Grinstead where about 1 mile (1.6 km) of the trackbed from Station Road to the Lewes Road tunnel has been taken over for a relief road, the A22 Beeching Way. As there is no feasible alternative route into the station, this road would need to be reconverted back to rail. Any such action would in all likelihood result in a reduction in capacity on an already highly congested local road network.
3. The site of Grange Road has disappeared under a small parade of shops as well as housing which block 0.64 miles (1.03 km) of the formation.
4. In 1974, East Sussex County Council created the Forest Way linear Country Park using the trackbed of the line from East Grinstead (just to the east of Beeching Way) as far as Groombridge. Similarly, in 1979 West Sussex County Council created the Worth Way linear Country Park using the disused Three Bridges to East Grinstead line. Both have been incorporated into Sustrans' National Cycle Route 1.

== In popular culture ==
In the book Winnie-the-Pooh Meets the Queen, Christopher Robin, Pooh, Piglet and Eeyore travel to London on a train from East Grinstead, which is the nearest railway station to Ashdown Forest, to deliver a present for the Queen's 90th birthday. Although the station is not named in the text, the station sign is shown in an illustration.
