= Sharpthorne =

Village in West Sussex, England

Coordinates: 51.07478°N 0.04136°W

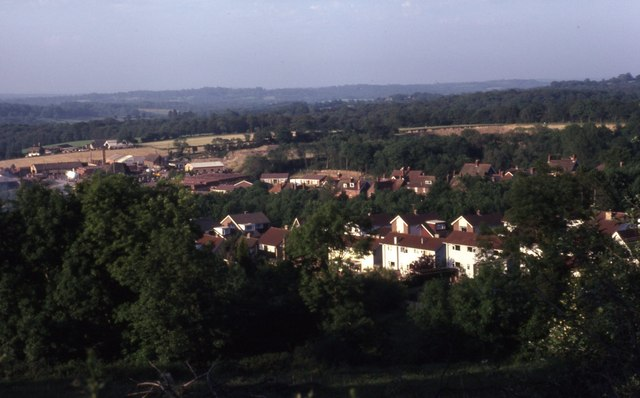

- Location within West Sussex
- OS grid reference: TQ373324
- Civil parish: West Hoathly
- District: Mid Sussex
- Shire county: West Sussex
- Region: South East
- Country: England
- Sovereign state: United Kingdom
- Post town: EAST GRINSTEAD
- Postcode district: RH19
- Dialling code: 01342
- Police: Sussex
- Fire: West Sussex
- Ambulance: South East Coast
- UK Parliament: East Grinstead and Uckfield

Sharpthorne is a village in the Mid Sussex District of West Sussex, South-East England. It lies on the West Hoathly to Forest Row road 3.8 miles (6.2 km) south of East Grinstead.

The Bluebell Railway runs through the 731 yards (668 m) long Sharpthorne Tunnel underneath the village, the longest tunnel on a UK heritage railway. Prior to its closure in 1958, the village was served by West Hoathly railway station at the north end of the tunnel. The railway tracks were lifted in 1964/5 and the main station building demolished in 1967. When the Bluebell Railway reinstated the line in 1992 the station was not restored due to local residents' concerns about a likely increase in local road traffic. Now that the railway has been extended to East Grinstead, the line could provide a useful public transport facility for the residents of Sharpthorne, but it would not be possible to build a new station on the original site because current HMRI regulations do not permit a "new build" on a gradient. Any future station would most likely be located on the level stretch further north towards New Coombe Bridge which is further from the village.
