= Horsted Keynes railway station =

Preserved railway station in England

Horsted Keynes
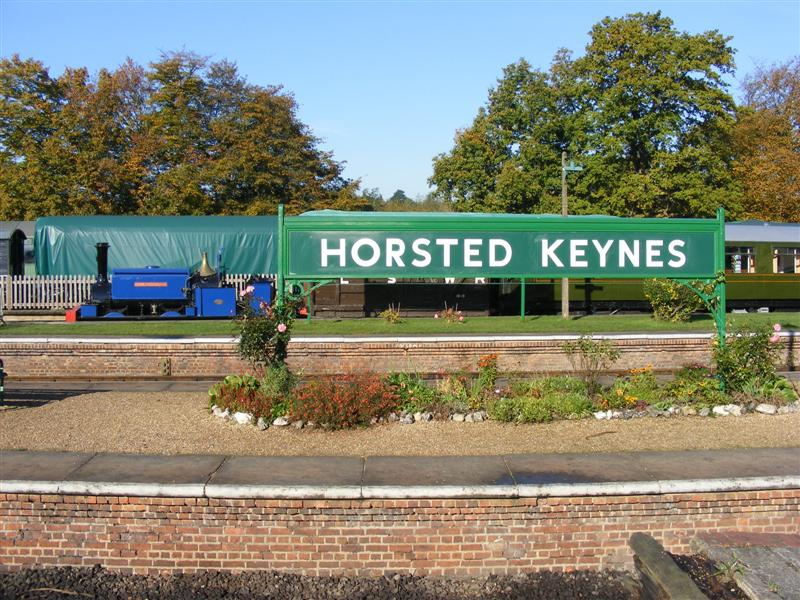
- The station sign and Sharpthorn

General information
- Location: Horsted Keynes, Mid Sussex, West Sussex; England
- Coordinates: 51.0461°N 0.0446°W
- Grid reference: TQ370292
- System: Station on heritage railway
- Owner: Southern Railway; Southern Region of British Railways; Bluebell Railway
- Manager: London, Brighton and South Coast Railway
- Platforms: 5 (with tracks 1,2,3 and 4/5)

Construction
- Architect: Thomas Myres

Key dates
- 1882: Station opened
- 7 July 1935: Electric trains commence via Ardingly
- 1962: Commencement of Bluebell Railway services
- 1963: Cessation of British Railways services
Location

Horsted Keynes railway station is a preserved railway station on the Bluebell Railway in Sussex. The station has been used as a shooting location in several film and TV productions.

== History ==
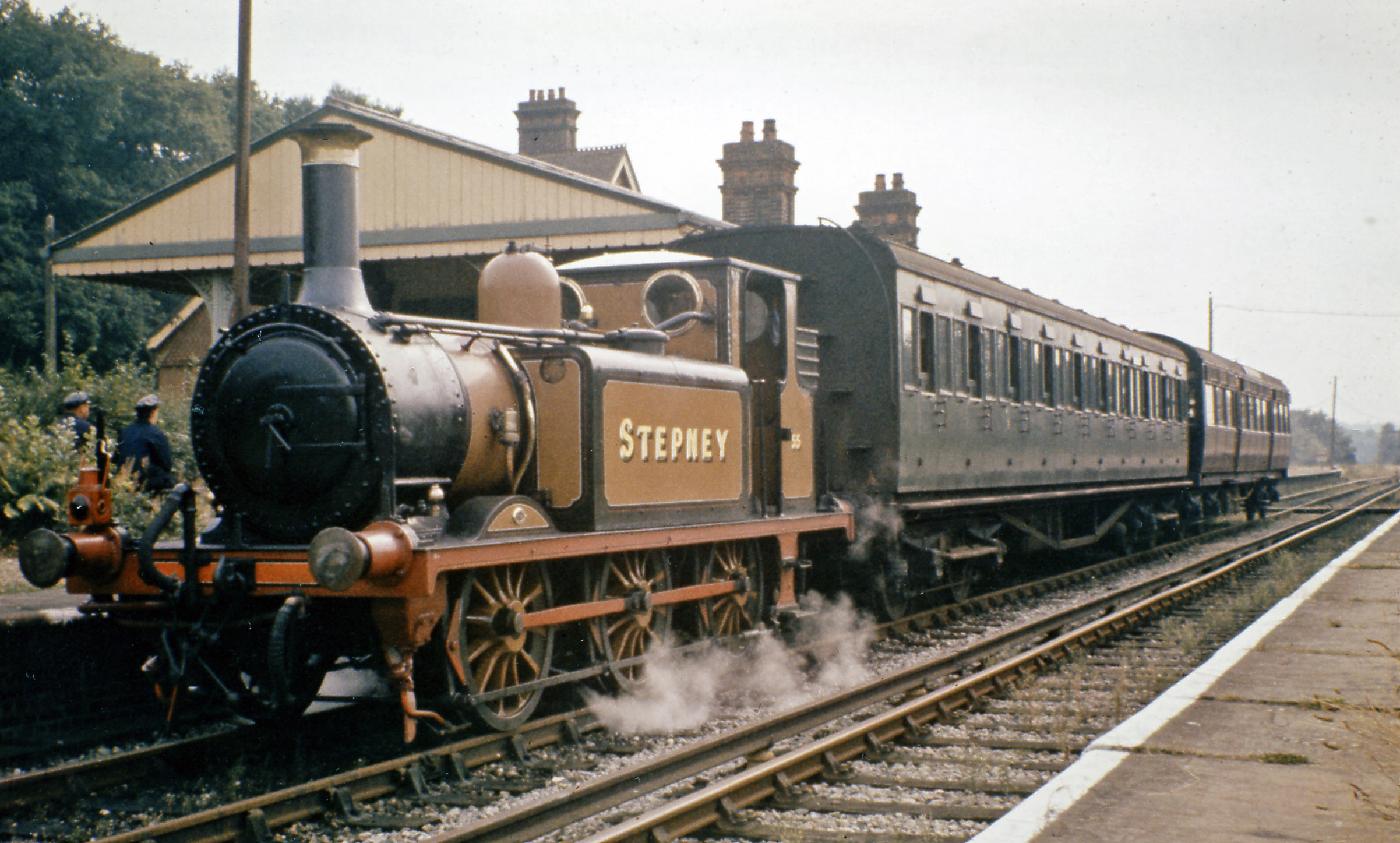
Bluebell Railway train at Horsted Keynes in 1964

The station was closed by British Railways under the Beeching Axe on 28 October 1963 with the cessation of trains from Seaford via Haywards Heath (trains over the Lewes to East Grinstead line having ceased in 1958). However, the first Bluebell Railway trains had run on the last day of the 1962 season using the disused eastern side (electrified services only used Platform 2). Between 1960 and 1962, Bluebell Railway services had terminated at Bluebell Halt, a temporary station about one-half mile (800 m) to the south.

As a junction station it was the busiest station on the line in terms of services but arguably one of the quieter for passengers. The station lies about 1.5 miles (2.4 km) from the village of Horsted Keynes itself.

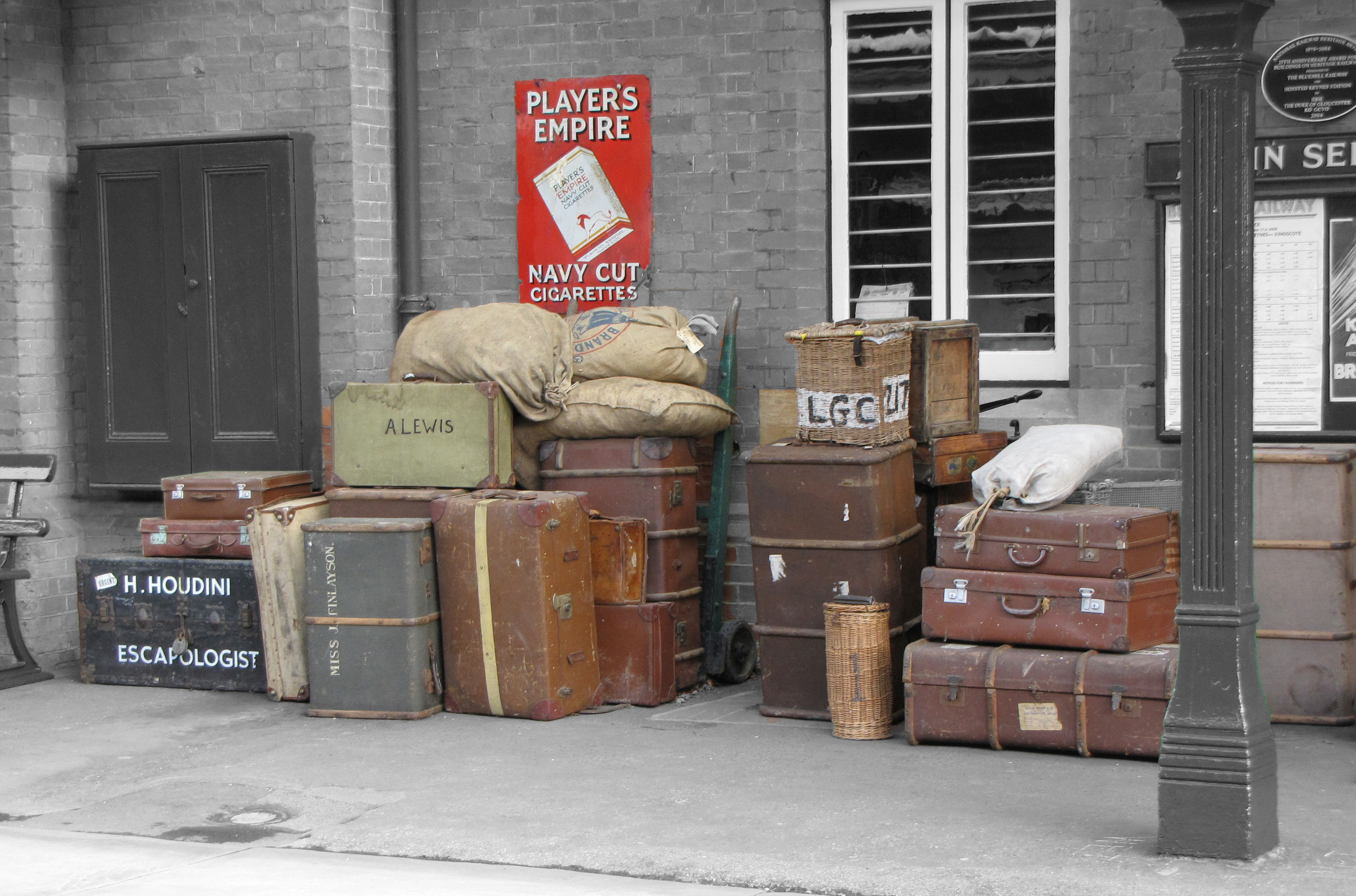
1930s ambience of Platform 5

Since being taken over by the Bluebell Railway, the station has become one of the most popular in UK preservation, and has won many awards. It has been restored with a 1930s theme, including period newspaper headlines on boards by the buffet, and advertisements of the period. With five platforms, it is the largest preserved heritage railway station in the UK. Horsted Keynes is the crossing place for services when two trains are operating, and hosts many events each year for steam enthusiasts. It is also the home of the line's Carriage and Wagon department.

Repair and restoration work on the canopy on Platform 5 began in late 2022, as part of the "Jewel in the Crown" project to refurbish the station buildings, financed by a fund-raising campaign which had accumulated £543,000 by the start of 2022.

The Bluebell Railway plans to make the station a junction once again if plans to extend toward Ardingly are realised, creating something rare within UK preservation, a junction station at which both lines are operated by preservationists.

== Listed buildings ==
The main station building, the signal box, and an engine house to the south of the station, are all Grade II Listed buildings. All three were originally built in or shortly after 1882, to the designs of Thomas Myres, the railway company's staff architect.

The railway has been featured in many television series and films, including Foyle's War, Downton Abbey, Poirot and The Woman In Black.

== See also ==
- List of closed railway stations in Britain

| Preceding station | Heritage railways | Following station |
|---|---|---|
| Kingscote towards East Grinstead | Bluebell Railway | Sheffield Park Terminus |
| | Disused railways | |
| West Hoathly; Line open, station closed | London, Brighton and South Coast Railway; Lewes and East Grinstead Railway | Sheffield Park; Line and station open |
| West Hoathly; Line open, station closed | London, Brighton and South Coast Railway; Lewes and East Grinstead Railway | Ardingly; Line and station closed |

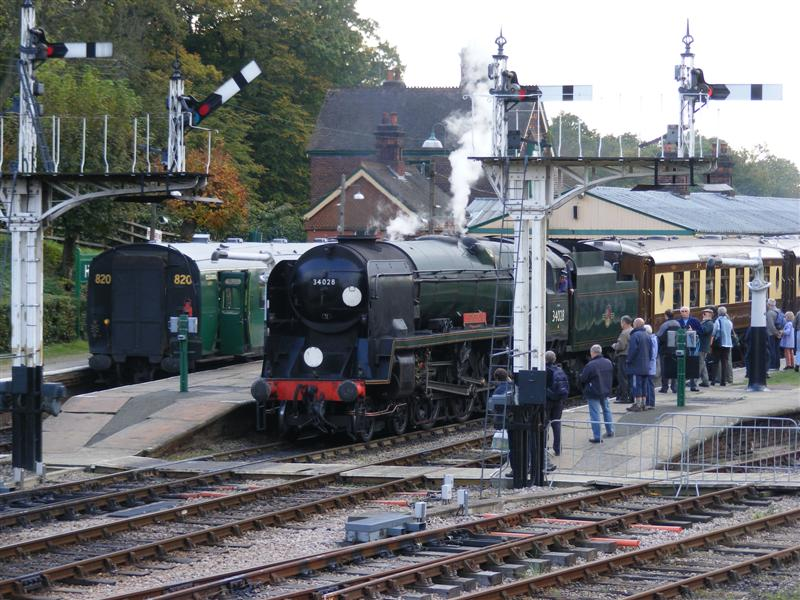
The classic view of the north end of the station, here with 34028 Eddystone.

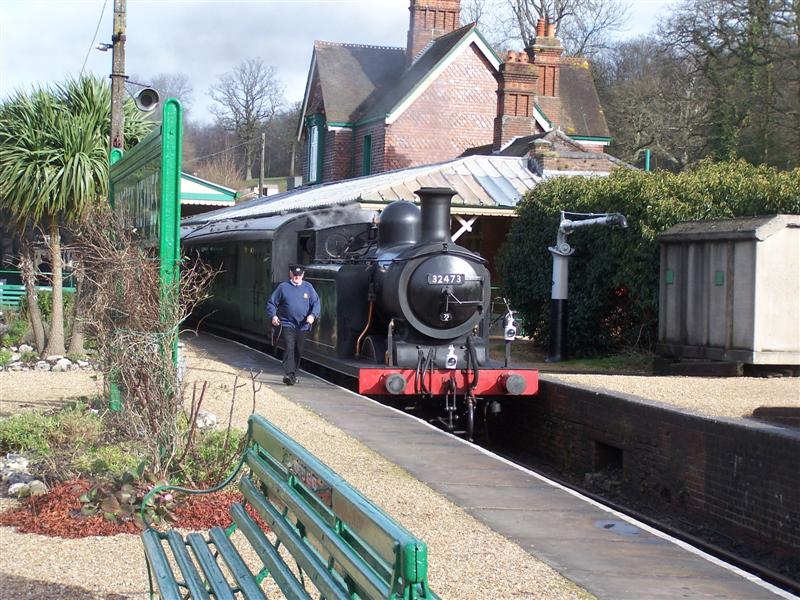
E4 32473 in the double-sided Platforms 4 and 5.

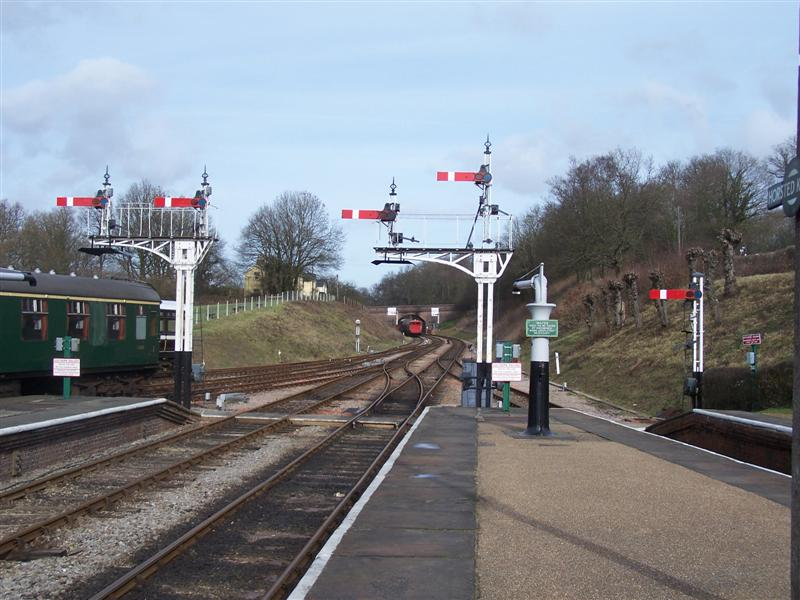
The north end after resignalling to allow both lines to the junction beyond the bridge to be used.

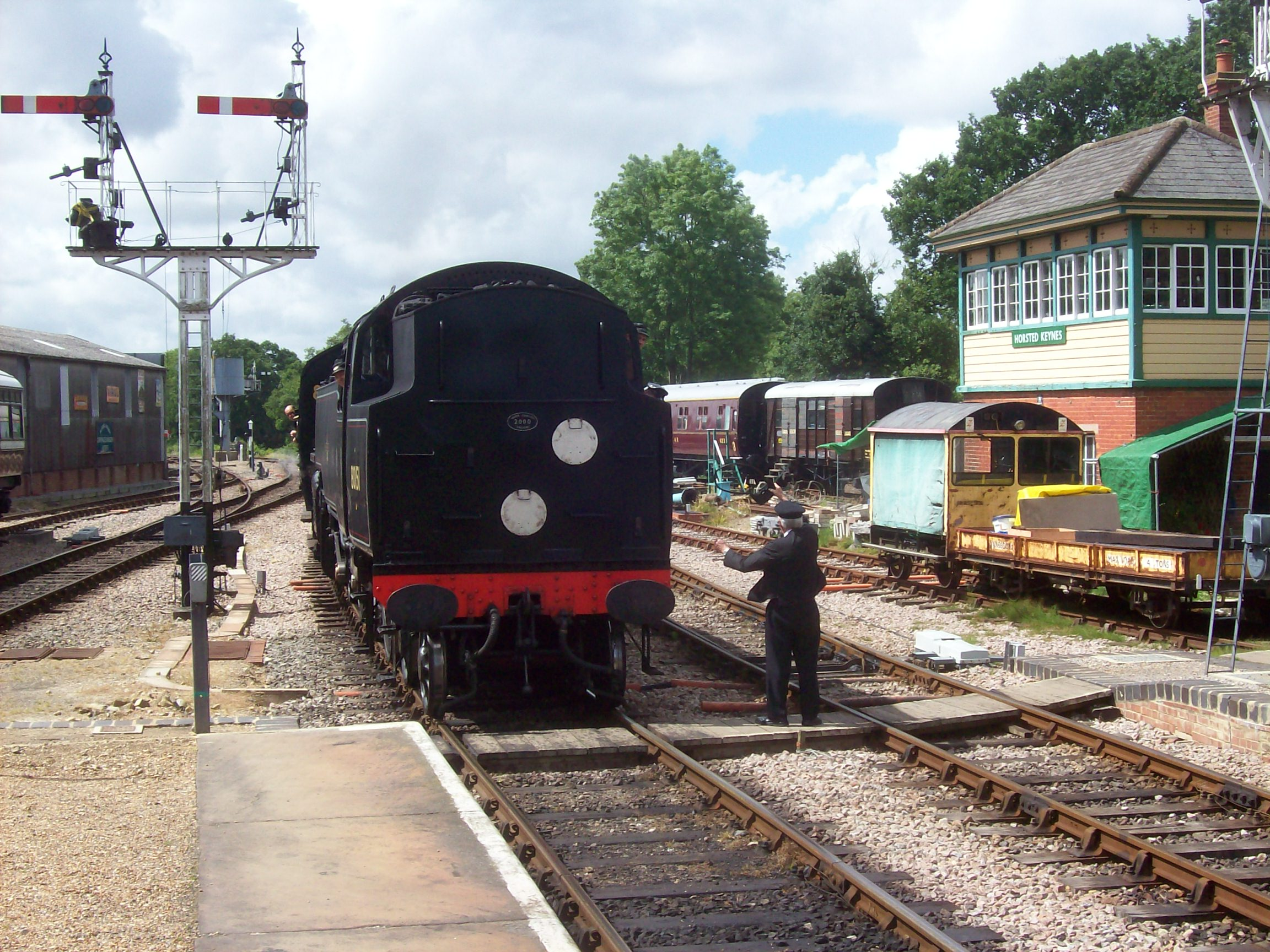
The south end of the station featuring the signal box on the right with the junction beyond and carriage works on the left.
