= Bluebell Railway =

Heritage railway in England

Coordinates: 51.0329°N 0.0467°W

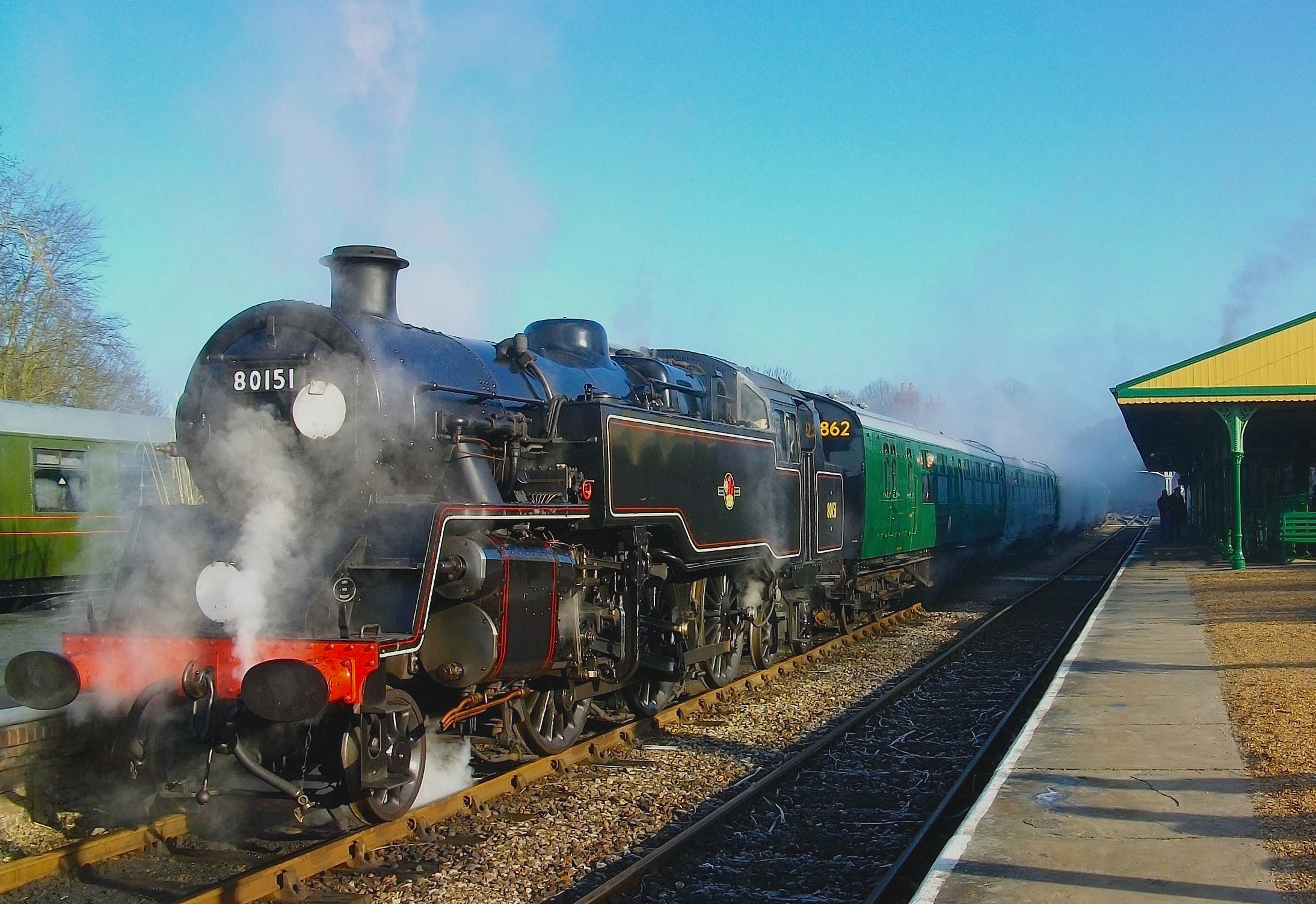
- British Railways Standard Class 4 No. 80151 and its train are seen at Horsted Keynes
- Terminus: East Grinstead

Commercial operations
- Built by: London, Brighton and South Coast Railway
- Original gauge: 4 ft 8 1/2 in (1,435 mm) standard gauge

Preserved operations
- Operated by: Bluebell Railway Preservation Society
- Stations: 4
- Length: 11 mi (17.7 km)
- Preserved gauge: 4 ft 8 1/2 in (1,435 mm) standard gauge

Commercial history
- Opened: 1 August 1882
- Closed: 17 March 1958

Preservation history
- 1960: Re-opens to the public between Sheffield Park and Bluebell Halt
- 1962: Extension opens from Bluebell Halt to Horsted Keynes
- 1994: Extension to Kingscote re-opened
- 2013: Extension to East Grinstead re-opened
- Headquarters: Sheffield Park station

The Bluebell Railway is an 11-mile (17.7 km) standard-gauge heritage railway spanning the border of East Sussex and West Sussex, England. Running between Sheffield Park and East Grinstead, the line is notable as the world's first preserved standard gauge, steam-operated passenger railway to launch a regular public timetable service. Operated primarily by volunteers under the Bluebell Railway Preservation Society, the line serves as a living museum dedicated to recreating British branch line operations from the Victorian era through to the late 1960s.

The infrastructure originally formed the northern half of the Lewes and East Grinstead Railway, built by the London, Brighton and South Coast Railway (LB&SCR) and opened in 1882. Following years of declining traffic, British Railways officially closed the line in 1958. Preservationists successfully launched a rescued operation across a 4.5-mile (7.2 km) southern portion of the route on 7 August 1960. Over the subsequent five decades, the railway undertook iterative northern extensions, culminating in the 2013 completion of a major civil engineering project. This final expansion involved removing 100,000 tonnes of domestic waste from the Imberhorne cutting and reconstructing infrastructure to reconnect the line with the National Rail network at East Grinstead station.

The railway preserves one of the most significant collections of historical rolling stock in the United Kingdom with over 30 steam locomotives, a collection second in size only to the National Railway Museum, with a particular emphasis on engines native to the pre-Grouping southern railway companies. The line features four operating stations: Sheffield Park, Horsted Keynes, Kingscote, and East Grinstead. Horsted Keynes serves as a junction and preservation workshop hub, maintaining a fleet of nearly 150 vintage carriages and wagons that includes rare timber-framed Victorian coaches and Pullman dining stock.

As a prominent tourist destination, the Bluebell Railway contributes to regional heritage tourism and engineering education. Its preserved period backdrops make it a frequent location for commercial film and television productions. Looking forward, long-term preservation goals focus on the consolidation of existing structural assets, upgrading maintenance facilities, and assessing the viability of western track reinstatements toward Ardingly to establish a connection with the Brighton Main Line.

== History ==
Lewes and East Grinstead Railway Act 1877
- Act of Parliament
- Parliament of the United Kingdom
- Long title: An Act for incorporating the Lewes and East Grinstead Railway Company; and for other purposes.
- Citation: 40 & 41 Vict. c. ccxviii

Dates
- Royal assent: 10 August 1877

Text of statute as originally enacted

An act of Parliament, the Lewes and East Grinstead Railway Act 1877 (40 & 41 Vict. c. ccxviii) authorised construction of the Lewes and East Grinstead Railway (L&EGR). The line was sponsored by local landowners, including the Earl of Sheffield. A year later another act, the London, Brighton, and South Coast Railway (Croydon, Oxted, and East Grinstead Railways) Act 1878 (41 & 42 Vict. c. lxxii), enabled the London, Brighton and South Coast Railway Company (LB&SCR), chaired by Samuel Laing, to acquire and operate the line.

The branch line had six stations, but only Barcombe was within walking distance of a village. Chailey parish had two stations, one at Sheffield Park and the other at Newick and Chailey. It was customary for a rural line supported by a company or individuals to have stations close to the residences of its sponsors. Thus Sheffield Park station was built for the Earl of Sheffield, and Newick and Chailey for Newick Park and Reedens, the homes of two other sponsors. The other stations were at Kingscote, West Hoathly and Horsted Keynes. A branch ran from a junction at Horsted Keynes to Ardingly and Haywards Heath on the LB&SCR main line.

The 1877 act bound the companies to an operating agreement, including clause 12 that required:

… at least four passenger trains each way daily [to run on this line], in through connections at East Grinstead to and from London […]. The said four trains shall stop at Sheffield Bridges, Newick, and West Hoathly Stations.

Section 35 of the 1878 act converted the 12 article of the agreement into a direct term of the act, binding on the L&BSCR.

This imposed a legal requirement to provide a service, and the only way to remove this obligation was to pass another act.

Designed under instructions from LB&SCR Chief Engineer Frederick Banister, the line was constructed to take double track. However, only the section between East Grinstead and Horsted Keynes (and thence to Haywards Heath via Ardingly) was laid as such; south of the junction at Horsted Keynes the line was single track with passing loops at stations. The line was opened in 1882.

Goods traffic on the line consisted of local produce; milk: farm products and coal, and timber to and from Albert Turner & Son, a sawmill. The only time Sheffield Park received a substantial number of passengers was when Lord Sheffield entertained the Australian cricket team, with a match between them and Lord Sheffield's own team.

=== Accident ===
On 31 July 1943, newlyweds Ronald Knapp and Winifred Standing were killed when they were pulled under a train from Lewes to East Grinstead. The couple walked along the railway on a dark rainy night. When the train got to Horsted Keynes, the guard found a raincoat covered with blood on the engine. Another coat was found near two bodies in the middle of the tracks. The ganger who found them told the inquest the couple must have been walking with their backs to the train.

"There was a very heavy squall at the time and the couple would probably have not heard a thing," he said. The coroner said Ronald and Winifred were trespassing and no blame could be attached to any railway worker. Little more than a week after they were married, the couple's funeral was at St Giles' Church, Horsted Keynes, where they are buried together in a grave marked by a War Graves Commission headstone.

=== Closure ===
In 1954, long before the Beeching Axe, the branch line committee of British Railways proposed closing the line from East Grinstead to Culver Junction near Lewes. This was challenged by local residents, but closure was agreed in February 1955 for 15 June 1955, although the line was closed down on 30 May 1956 due to a rail strike. An acrimonious battle between British Railways and the users of the Bluebell Line then ensued, and lasted three years.

Shortly after closure, Madge Bessemer of Chailey discovered in the 1877 and 1878 acts the clauses relating to the "Statutory Line", and demanded British Railways reinstate services. On 7 August 1956, British Railways reopened the line, with trains stopping at stations mentioned in the acts. British Railways took the case to the House of Commons in 1957, resulting in a public inquiry. British Railways were censured, but later the Transport Commission persuaded Parliament to repeal section 35 of the 1878 act in section 73 of the British Transport Commission Act 1957 (5 & 6 Eliz. 2. c. xxxiii). By this means the line was finally closed down to regular passenger services on 17 March 1958. although a few special passenger trains ran on the line between East Grinstead and Horsted Keynes until about 1960.

== Preservation ==
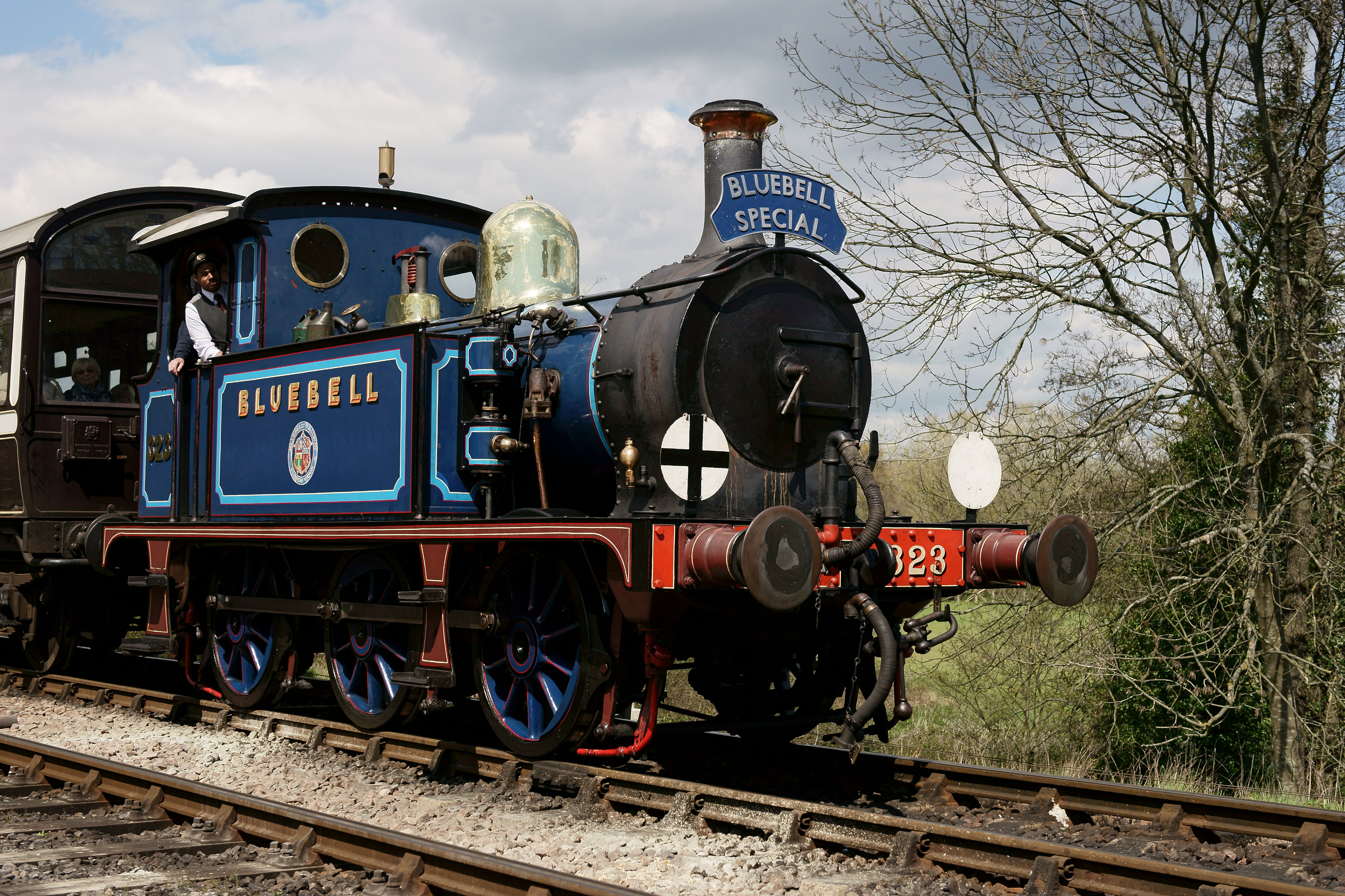
Bluebell Railway SECR P class Bluebell 323

On 15 March 1959, a group that included the future president of the society, Bernard Holden, met in Ardingly and formed the Lewes & East Grinstead Railway Preservation Society. The society elected John Leroy as the first chairman, and £940 was raised in donations to start the society. On a vote at the meeting, the society changed its name to the Bluebell Railway Preservation Society.

The society's initial aim was to reopen the whole line from East Grinstead to Culver Junction as a commercial service, using a two-car DMU. The plans came to nothing: the society failed to buy the whole line, and most local residents were not interested. The committee then recommended that the stretch of track between Sheffield Park and Horsted Keynes could be run as a tourist attraction, with vintage locomotives and stock operated by unpaid volunteer staff.

=== Sheffield Park to Horsted Keynes ===
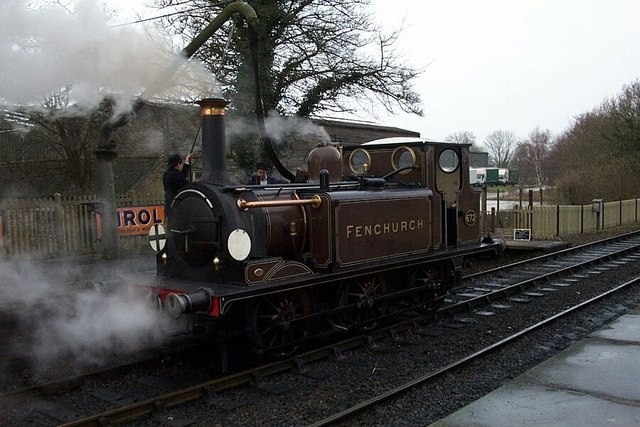
Bluebell Railway A1 Fenchurch taking on water at Sheffield Park Station.

As British Railways still ran an electrified line from Horsted Keynes to Haywards Heath, the society leased a stretch of track from BR just south of Horsted Keynes, this having been authorised by the British Transport Commission (Horsted Keynes and Sheffield Park) Light Railway Order 1960 (SI 1960/1022). In 1960, the interim line was opened, running from Sheffield Park to Bluebell Halt, 100 yards (91 m) south of Horsted Keynes. In 1962, the society extended services to Horsted Keynes. Also in 1962, a halt was opened at Holywell (Waterworks). However, this was closed the following year. BR withdrew passenger services from Horsted Keynes to Haywards Heath in 1963; and with complete closure of the line north of Horsted Keynes, the Bluebell Line was severed from the British Rail system.

=== Horsted Keynes to Kingscote ===
In 1974, the society purchased the freehold of the demolished West Hoathly station, allowing the first steps to be taken towards an extension northwards towards East Grinstead station. It then purchased the freehold of the site of Kingscote station in January 1985. These efforts culminated in a public inquiry, with the secretaries of state for the Environment and Transport giving planning permission in 1985, and the Bluebell Extension Light Railway Order 1986 (SI 1986/343) being granted.

The Bluebell Railway Preservation Society completed the extension from Horsted Keynes to Kingscote in April 1994, re-laying track through Sharpthorne Tunnel, which at 731 yards or 668 metres is the longest on a UK heritage railway. At the north end of Sharpthorne Tunnel, the line passes through the site of the former West Hoathly railway station. It was demolished in 1967, but remains of the platforms and goods dock are still visible.

2010 marked the Bluebell's 50th anniversary of running trains. To mark the event, the railway held a gala over 6–8 August 2010 with all available home engines and two visitor engines. Some of the society's founder members gathered at Horsted Keynes to mark the arrival of a commemorative LB&SCR A1X class No. 55 Stepney-hauled steam train. The entourage then travelled towards Sheffield Park.

=== Kingscote to East Grinstead via Imberhorne ===
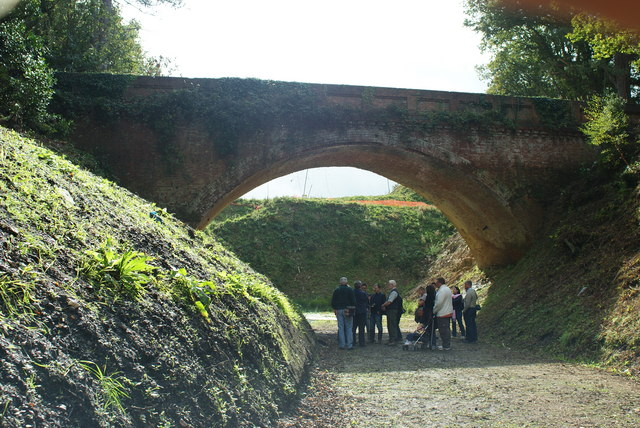
This cutting between Kingscote and East Grinstead had been used as a rubbish tip, and the waste material had to be cleared before the line could be reopened. The track northeast of this point was relaid to allow the waste to be removed by rail.

From its inception, the society had always planned to work northwards towards East Grinstead, where the line would connect with the national network. BR donated Imberhorne Viaduct to the railway in 1992, but the purchase of the final pieces of the by then privately owned track bed north to East Grinstead was only completed in 2003, allowing physical civil engineering activity to be undertaken from that year.

A major problem was the former landfill site in the 30-foot-deep (9.1 m) cutting just south of Imberhorne Viaduct. It had been filled with domestic waste by East Grinstead Town Council in the 1960s and 1970s, but tests undertaken by contractors working for both the society and the borough council found the 96,000 cubic metres (3,400,000 cu ft) of waste within the 500-metre-long (1,600 ft) cutting were not toxic.

The excavated clay-cap covering the landfill site was taken south by rail, to fill the site of a removed viaduct and embankment on the old Ardingly spur. In January 2008 agreement was given to start clearing foliage on the section of the tip between Imberhorne Lane and Hill Place bridges. In a public launch event, BBC newsreader Nicholas Owen—a local resident and society volunteer—started removal of the actual waste on 25 November 2008.

Initially rubbish was removed from the site by lorry, but, due to the substantial volume and cost of about £45/tonne, in 2009 a trial removal of spoil by rail was carried out by DB Schenker Rail (UK). At £25,000 per train and now undertaken by GB Railfreight, this practice continued periodically as funds became available. However, an increase in the landfill tax was announced in 2008, and this was due to take effect from April 2012. It would increase the cost of removal from £25/tonne to £90/tonne. So the society formed an appeal to complete the removal of the landfill waste by the end of March 2012. With the receiving site changed to Appleford, Oxfordshire and thanks to the "tenner for the tip" appeal, the cash target was met and the rubbish was removed by rail in time.

In autumn 2008 work started on site clearance at East Grinstead for construction of the new station about 100 yards (91 m) south of the national rail station. At the railway's 50th anniversary celebration weekend in 2010, East Sussex resident Dame Vera Lynn launched a £3.8 million appeal; the greater part of this amount would be put towards reconnecting the line to East Grinstead. Mid Sussex District Council responded with a one-off donation of £50,000 towards the reconnection.

On 7 March 2013, the last section of track was formally joined using a white fishplate, with the honour of tightening the four bolts being given to Barbara Watkins, a long-standing Bluebell Railway volunteer. The extension to East Grinstead was officially opened on Saturday 23 March, with a two-week opening festival starting that day.

=== West: Horsted Keynes to Haywards Heath via Ardingly ===
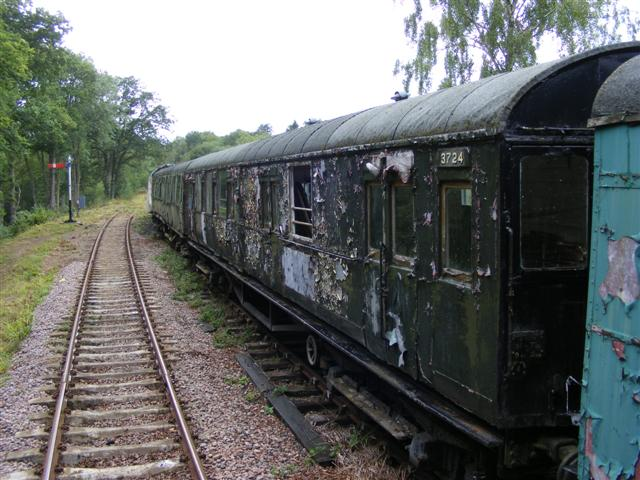
The Ardingly spur, just south of Horsted Keynes

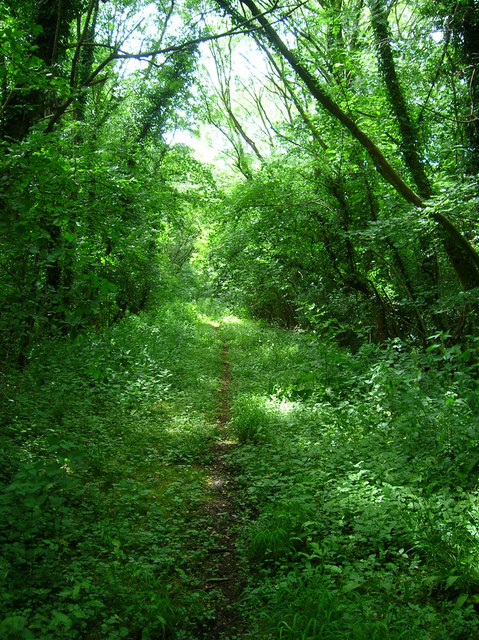
The trackbed just east of the Hanson Aggregates depot, Ardingly

Originally built as a double-track line, it was electrified in the 1930s, with 2-NOL units used for the Seaford-Horsted Keynes service. The line between Horsted Keynes and Ardingly was operated as single-track in its final years, with 2-BIL/Class 401 and 2-HAL/Class 402 units. The second track was left in place and used for carriage storage, most notably the new Kent Coast electric stock prior to its introduction and later the steam-hauled stock that it replaced.

After the line's closure in 1963, the trackbed was purchased in its entirety by a member of the local gentry. In the 1990s the society bought the abandoned trackbed west between Horsted Keynes and Ardingly from his estate. This included up to the Hanson Aggregates depot built on the former Ardingly railway station site.

The society plans to reconnect the line with Network Rail at Copyhold Junction, to allow access to the London to Brighton Main Line. Stations could either be located at Copyhold or Haywards Heath. There is a proposal that the line could be restored as third rail electrified, allowing operation of the society's electric stock.

While the 218-yard (199 m) Lywood Tunnel remains in good condition, there are two major areas of work that would be required to re-open the line, these being the replacement of a short girder-bridge span bridge and the 117-yard (107 m) Sheriff Mill Viaduct, which was demolished in 1969. The removed clay-cap from Imberhorne cutting has been deposited on the banks of the former Sheriff Mill viaduct to allow later bridging of the gap. Also in 2013, the former Tewkesbury and Malvern Railway bridge that crossed over the M50 motorway was donated to the railway for eventual installation in the replacement bridge.

=== South: Sheffield Park to Lewes ===
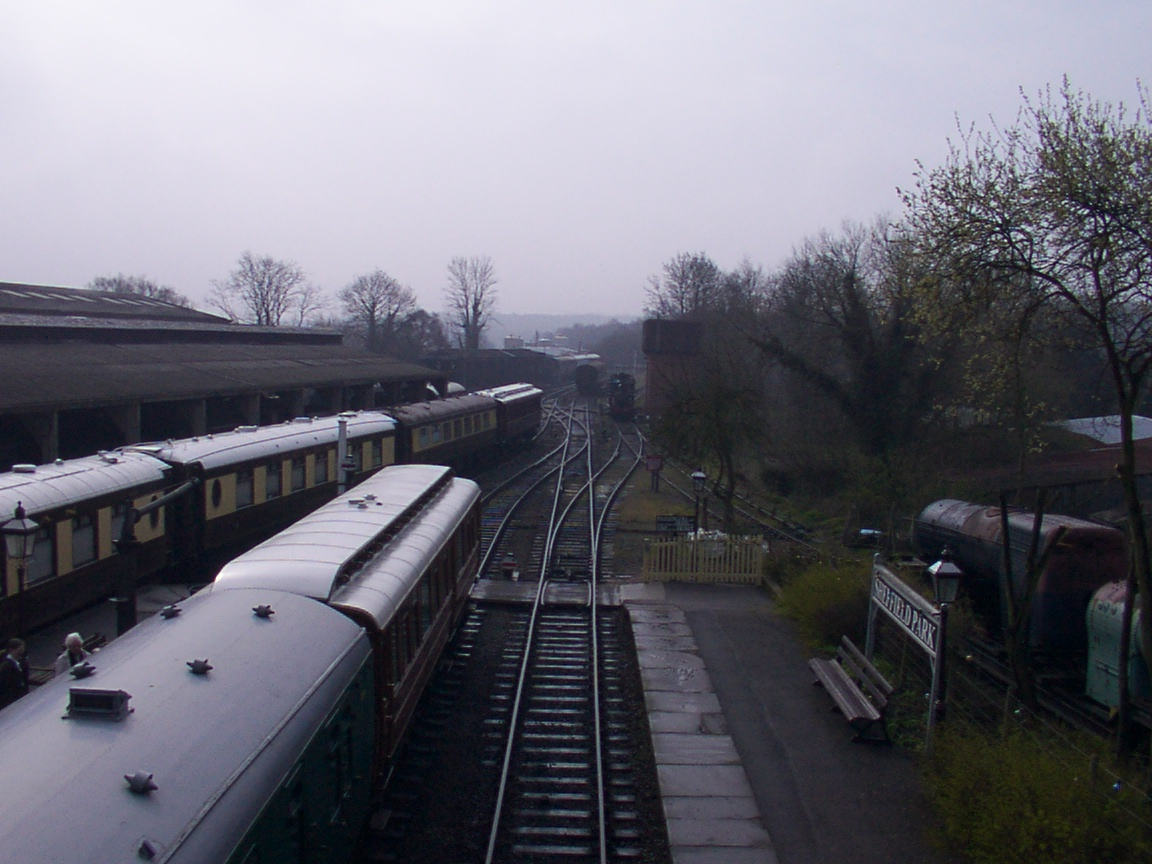
Looking south towards the former line to Newick and Chailey and to Lewes, from Sheffield Park

By the late Victorian era, Lewes station was the convergence point of three lines from the East Sussex coast and three lines to the north all of which reached London via Croydon. Today, Lewes has a line to the north which joins the Brighton main Line at Burgess Hill and from there on to Gatwick Airport, East Croydon and London, a line west towards Brighton, a line south to Newhaven and Seaford, and a line east to Eastbourne, Hastings and Ashford.

Originally the Bluebell Line was the straightest and quickest route from Lewes to London. The Bluebell Railway ran directly south from Sheffield Park to Culver Junction (at Culver Farm just south of Barcombe Mills), with intermediate stations at Newick and Chailey and Barcombe. At Culver Junction it joined the 1858 Wealden Line (part of which is now restored as the nearby Heritage Lavender Line), thereby gaining access to Lewes. The section from East Grinstead to Culver Junction was closed in 1958, and the Lewes to Uckfield line in 1969 by British Railways.

Bluebell supporters and committee members have expressed interest in re-building the line south by three more stations to Lewes. However, a substantial number of large civil engineering obstacles and intrusions onto the former track-bed make this a difficult project to envisage the completion of. For execution, the project would require:

- The bridging of the raised, widened and re-aligned A275 road immediately south of Sheffield Park
- The in-filling since of the cutting and former route under the A272 road
- The re-excavation of waste-infill at the former Newick and Chailey, which includes industrial waste producing large amounts of methane gas discharges
- The fact that a large private housing estate has been built on and surrounding the former Newick and Chailey site

The remaining undeveloped line from Lewes to Sheffield Park has been safeguarded as a bridleway and footpath.

== Stations ==
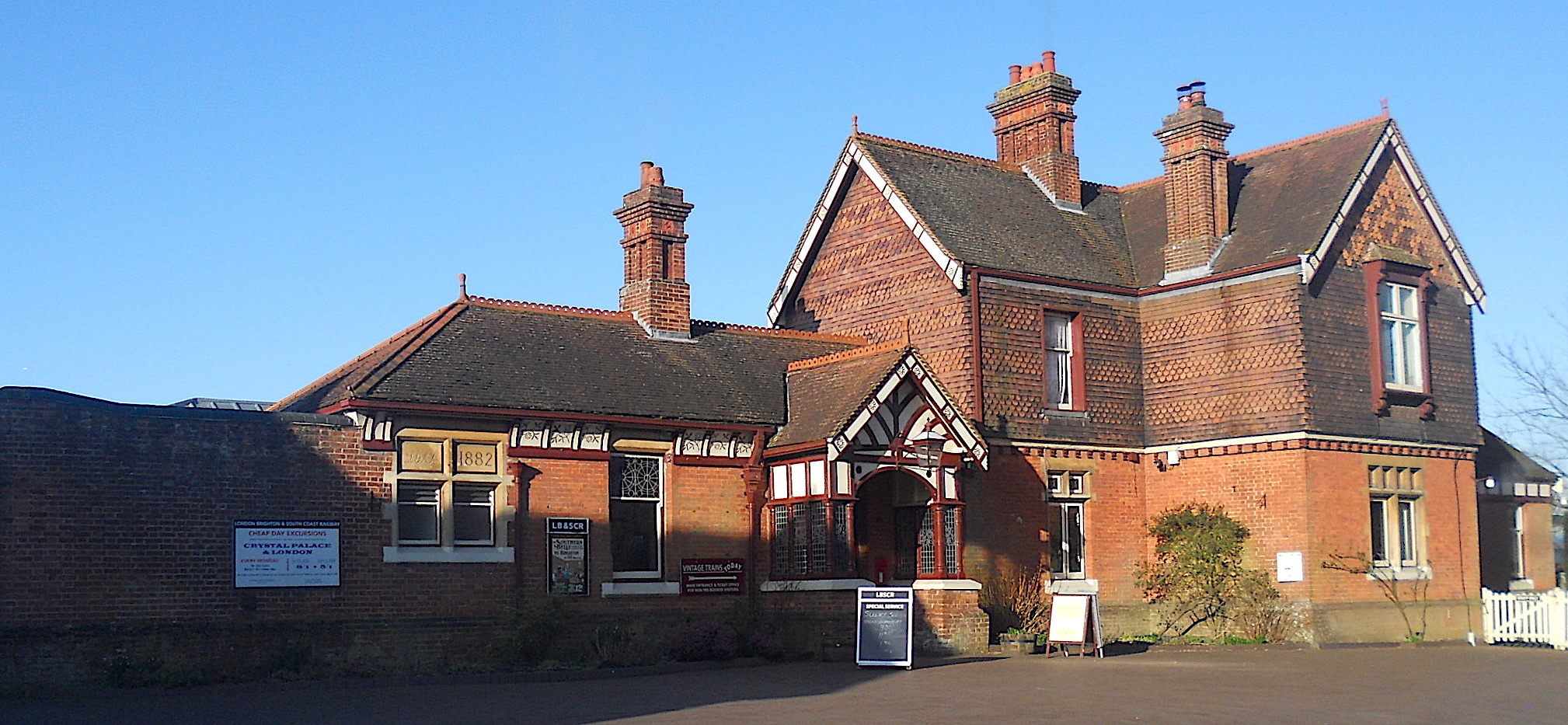
Sheffield Park station

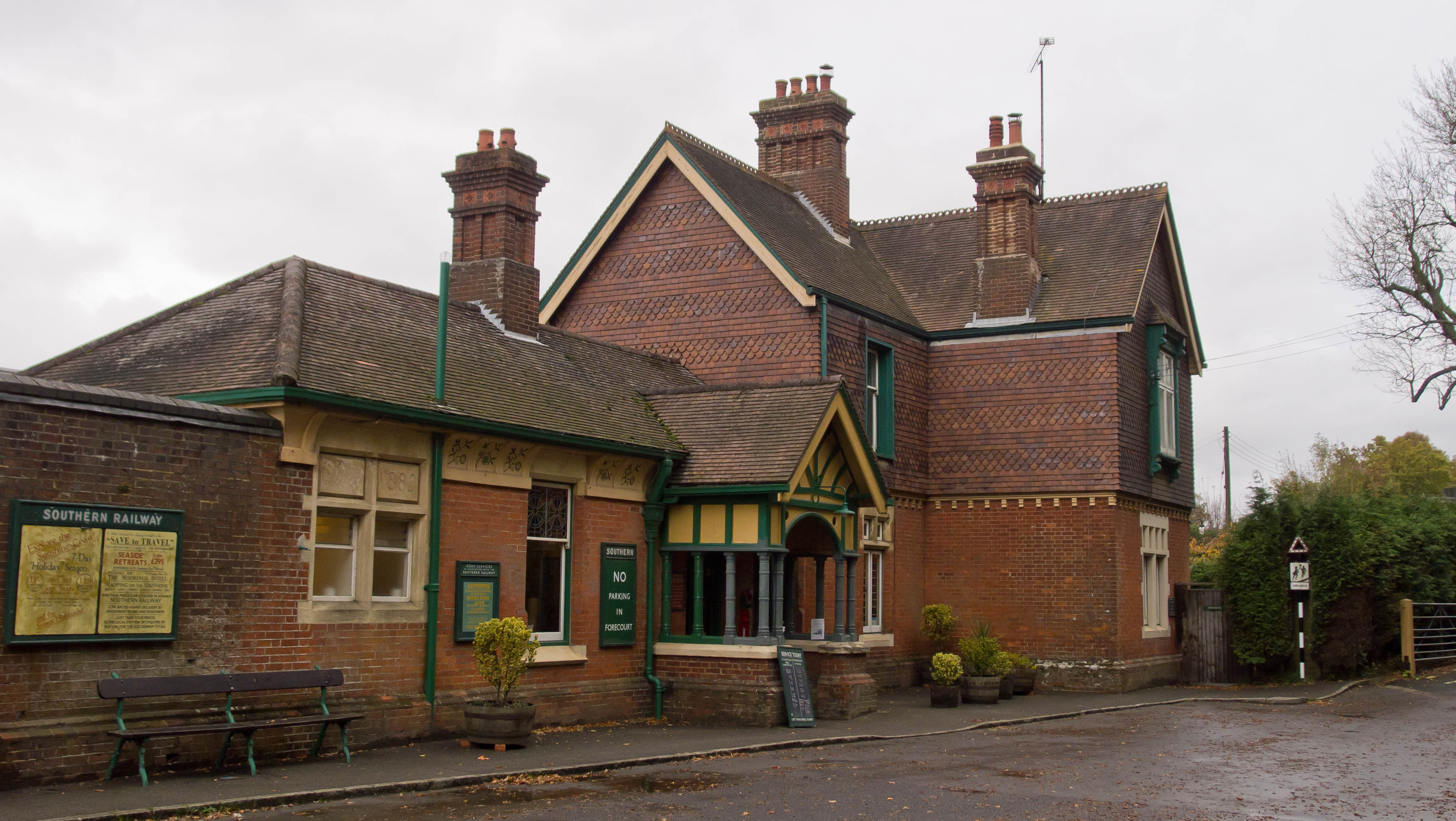
Horsted Keynes station

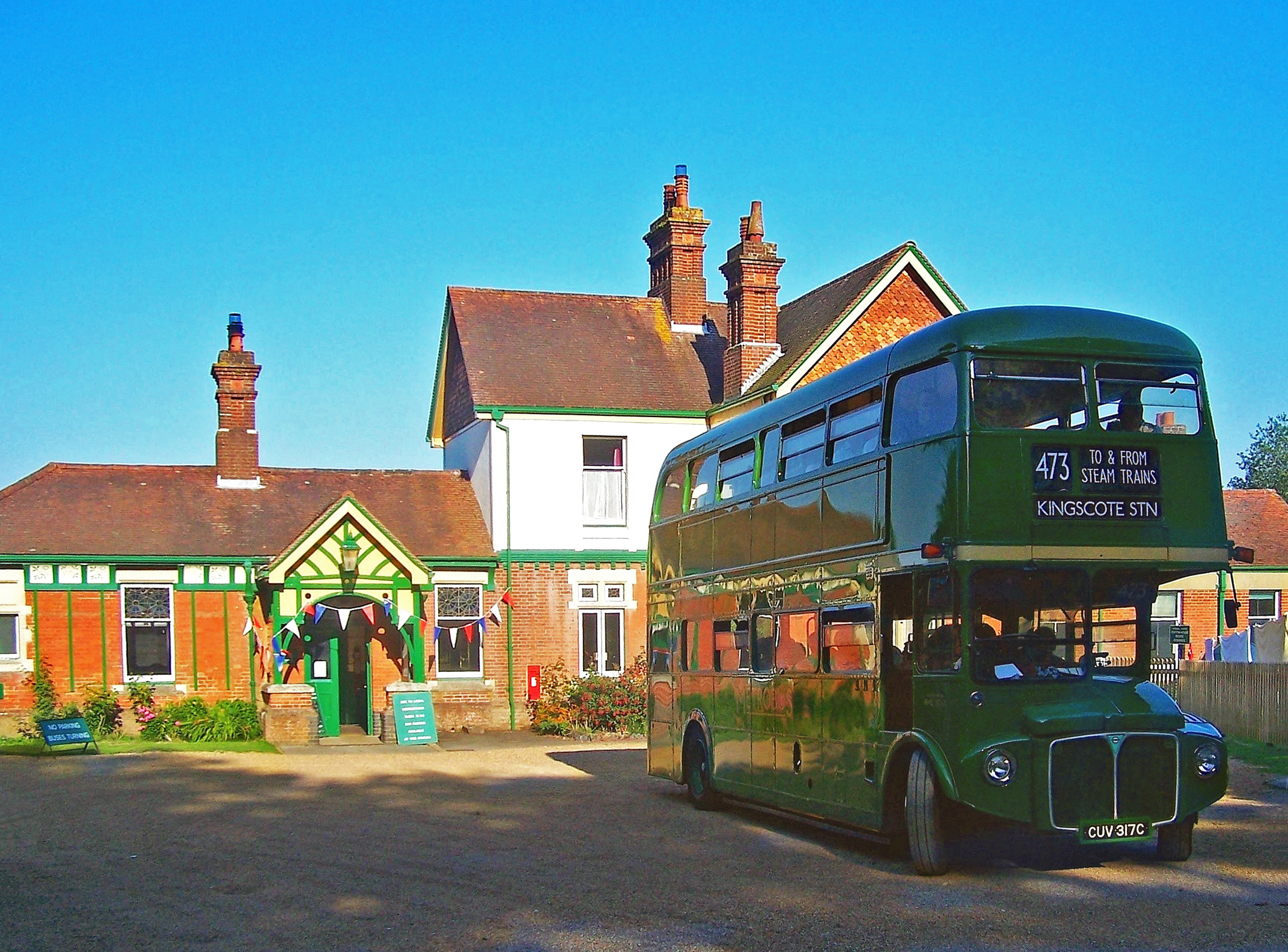
Kingscote station with AEC Routemaster bus on Route 473 East Grinstead – Kingscote service

The various stations have been restored to show different periods of the railway's life:

- Sheffield Park has been restored to a Victorian ambience, as it would have appeared during the time of the London, Brighton and South Coast Railway (up to 1922)
- Horsted Keynes emulates the Southern Railway from 1923 to 1947
- West Hoathly (if built) will emulate the British Railways of the late 1940s
- Kingscote echoes the British Railways of the 1950s
- East Grinstead is an amalgam of British Railways of the 1950s and 1960s

=== Heritage railway ===
East Grinstead to Sheffield Park

- East Grinstead
- Kingscote
- West Hoathly (closed)
- Horsted Keynes
- Bluebell Halt (closed)
- Holywell (Waterworks) (closed)
- Freshfield Halt (closed)
- Ketches Halt (closed)
- Sheffield Park

Horsted Keynes to Ardingly (proposed)

- Horsted Keynes
- Ardingly (proposed)

=== Original stations ===
East Grinstead (Low Level) to Lewes

- East Grinstead
- Kingscote
- West Hoathly
- Horsted Keynes
- Sheffield Park
- Newick and Chailey
- Barcombe
- Lewes

== Rolling stock ==
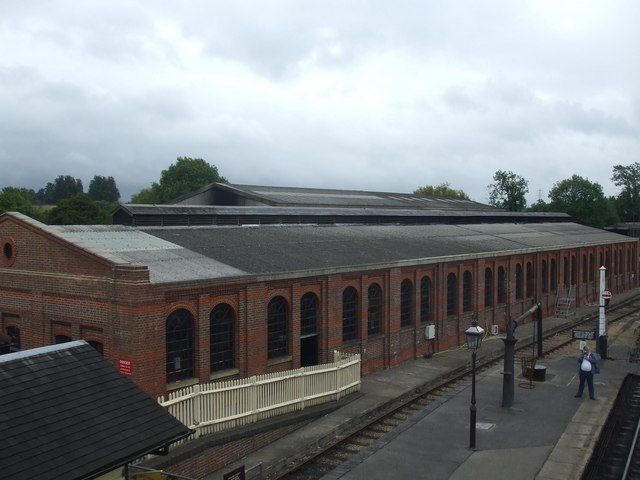
The new locomotive shed at Sheffield Park

The Bluebell Railway preserved a number of steam locomotives before the cessation of steam service on British mainline railways in 1968. Today it has the largest collection—over 30—of steam locomotives in the UK after the National Railway Museum (NRM). The society also has a collection of almost 150 carriages and wagons, most of them pre-war.

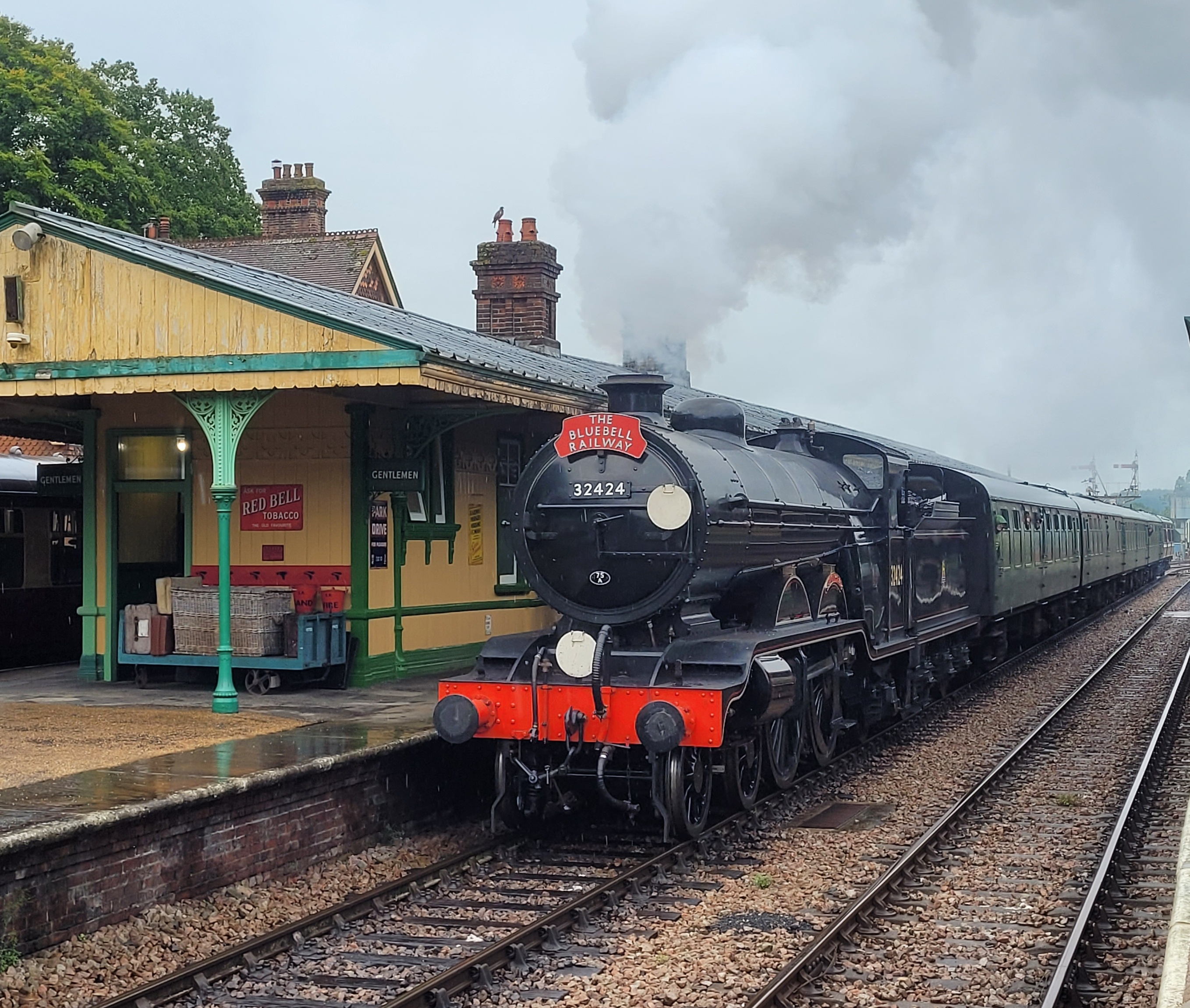
The newly completed locomotive passing through Horsted Keynes on its second day in public service, 23 August 2024

On 29 October 2000 the Bluebell Railway announced its intention to reconstruct a replica of SR/BR period LB&SCR H2 class Atlantic Beachy Head. By then, many surviving locomotive parts had been assembled including an ex-GNR 'Atlantic' boiler, and an ex-LB&SCR B4 class tender chassis. The boiler was tested around August 2018. The locomotive rolled out and was coupled to its tender on 5 March 2024, to begin commissioning work prior to entering service, which it did on 18 August 2024.

In April 2008, the Heritage Lottery Fund provided a £2.8M grant towards new buildings next to Sheffield Park, to provide weatherproof shelter for up to 17 carriages. The funds were also used to: create a museum and interpretation area; create new facilities for locomotive crews; create a rainwater catchment system from the roof of the carriage building, which is then processed and used to fill the steam engines' boilers; restore the railway's historic platform buildings.

== Twinning ==
The Bluebell Railway is twinned with the Museumstoomtram Hoorn – Medemblik, which links Hoorn and Medemblik, North Holland, the Netherlands.
