= Kingscote railway station =

Preserved railway station in England

Kingscote
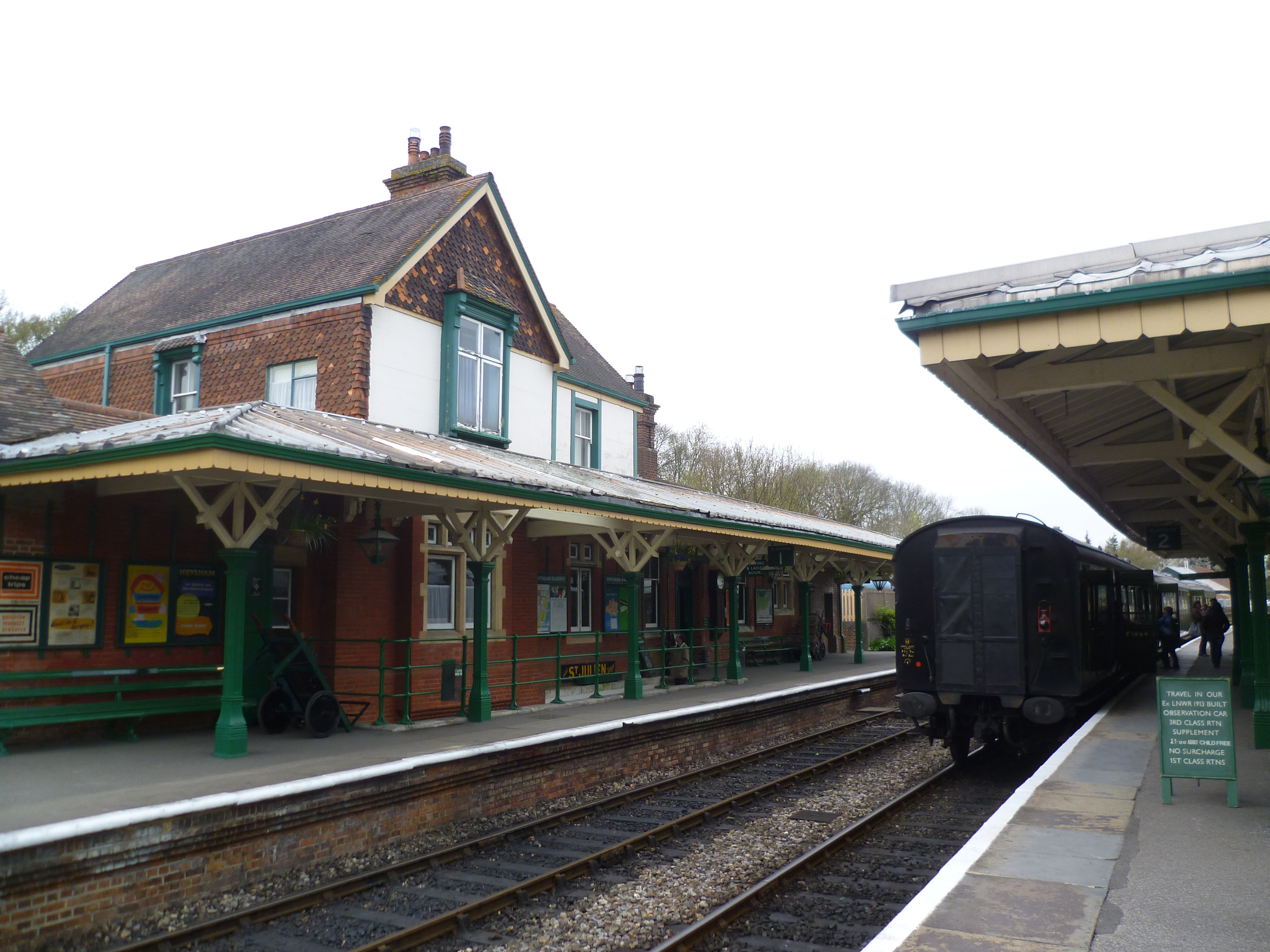
- A carriage set waits at the station

General information
- Location: Turners Hill, Mid Sussex, West Sussex; England
- Coordinates: 51.1031°N 0.0486°W
- Grid reference: TQ366356
- System: Station on heritage railway
- Owner: London, Brighton and South Coast Railway; Southern Railway; Southern Region of British Railways; Bluebell Railway
- Manager: Bluebell Railway
- Platforms: 2

Key dates
- 1882: Station opened
- 1955: Station closed
- 1994: Line reopened
- 2013: line to East Grinstead reopened
Location

Kingscote railway station is a preserved railway station on the heritage Bluebell Railway, located in West Sussex, England.

== History ==
The station was opened in 1882, and as it was constructed under the influence of the London Brighton and South Coast Railway (LB&SCR), a then substantial provision of £17,000 was made to construct each two-platform through station on the line. The line's stations were designed to visually appeal to Victorian London-commuters, who had travelled into the Sussex countryside looking for either a commuter property, or country cottage for the weekend. The design is attributed to Thomas Myres in common with several other stations in Sussex.

Designed in the then fashionable "Domestic Revival" style (similar to the later Tudor Revival architecture style), located on the eastwards facing No.1 upside platform, the lavish main station building was designed as a two-storey villa with a T-shaped footprint, with a single storey wing each side: booking office and toilets to the north; waiting room and storage to the south. All of this structure was fronted both sides by a timber-supported hipped canopy, which like all of the other buildings carried a hipped slate roof. The station had substantial sidings and a livestock loading dock located just to the north of No.1 platform. The downside No.2 platform was reached by a subway. The signal box was located on the north end of No.2 platform, and also controlled a single siding to the north of platform No.2.

Located in an area remote from any significant residential or commercial development, the station became known as the quietest on the LB&SCR. Were it not for the wood and logging trade which was undertaken on leased land within the station site, it is likely that the Southern Railway would have closed the loss-making station to passengers in the 1920s. Resultantly, in 1910 the goods shed was moved to Horsted Keynes, and the northern sidings complex greatly simplified. In the 1930s, the Southern Railway removed many of the superfluous LB&SCR decorations, and shortened the downside facilities to what was basically an open-plan shelter located next to the footbridge.

== Closure ==
The station closed on 30 May 1955. As it was not one of the named locations in the Bluebell's original Act of Parliament, it - along with Barcombe - remained closed when the line reopened from August 1956 to the second line closure in March 1958. The tracks were lifted by contractors in 1963, after which the site was sold to the original land owner. In the 1970s, the station was redeveloped as a fully residential house, with the downside No.2 platform demolished to allow substantial landscaping for a garden.

== Preservation ==
The majority of the former station site, minus a commercial yard on the site of the pre-1910 sidings which is currently used by a builder's merchant, was acquired by the Bluebell Railway Extension Company Ltd (the legal vehicle used by the charitable Bluebell Railway Society to buy the former land on which the railway had run, and undertake reconstruction of the line northwards), in the 1980s.

After a public enquiry into the line's extension plans north from Horsted Keynes, and having gained planning permission for the whole redevelopment to East Grinstead, the railway was first extended to a loop just north of the now demolished West Hoathly to allow rebuilding of New Coombe bridge. This gave access to the station site at Kingscote, where an initial run-around loop was installed. After reconstruction of the former downside No.2 platform, the station was reopened in 1994. To comply with the extension's planning permission, the station has no public car parking.

From its reopening in 1994 to 2013, the station acted as the northern terminus of the Bluebell Railway, until the extension to East Grinstead was opened.

== Present ==
Since reopening in 1994 the station has been adopted by the "Friends of Kingscote" group of volunteers, who provide general maintenance and undertake renovation projects. They also provide input to the Society's long term planning and development projects. This has included extending platforms to operate longer trains and rebuilding the signal box which was commissioned in 2015 employing a Westinghouse style L miniature lever frame unique in the standard gauge heritage railway world. During the winter most trains use platform No.1 whilst during the summer season No.2 is used more often because it has direct access to the picnic area and refreshment stand. Also known as "the loop" No.2 allows trains to pass each other on the single track line.

The station's reinstalled small goods yard is planned (under Bluebell's Long Term Plan) to be a re-creation of an authentic working 1950s country goods yard complete with Yard Crane, Cattle Pens and Coal Staithes.

== See also ==
- List of closed railway stations in Britain

Preceding station	Heritage railways	Following station
East Grinstead Terminus	Bluebell Railway	Horsted Keynes towards Sheffield Park
	Historical railways	
East Grinstead; Line and station open	London, Brighton and South Coast Railway; Lewes and East Grinstead Railway	West Hoathly; Line open, station closed
