= West Hoathly railway station =

Former railway station in England

Coordinates: 51.0787°N 0.0437°W

West Hoathly
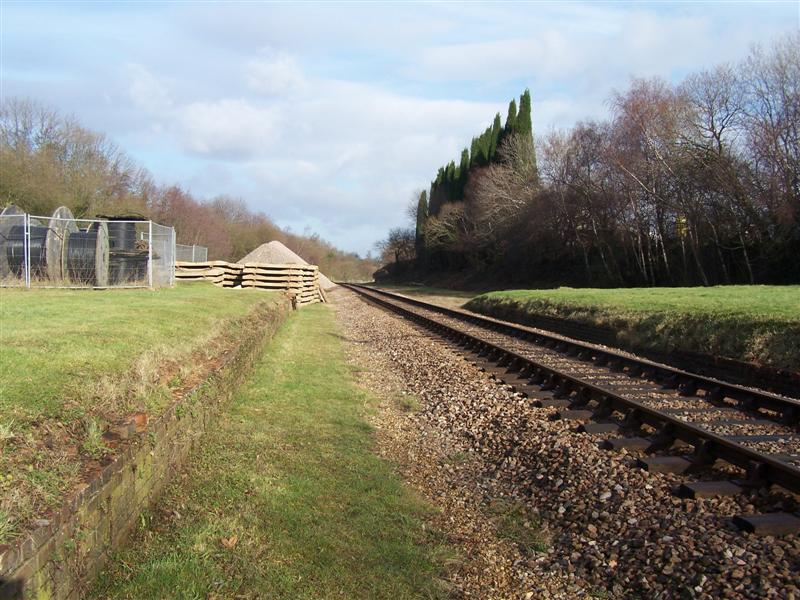
- The station remains seen in early 2006

General information
- Location: Sharpthorne, West Hoathly, Mid Sussex, West Sussex; England
- Grid reference: TQ371328
- Platforms: 2

Construction
- Architect: Thomas Myres
- Architectural style: Domestic Revival

Other information
- Status: Disused

History
- Pre-grouping: London, Brighton and South Coast Railway
- Post-grouping: Southern Railway; Southern Region of British Railways; Bluebell Railway

Key dates
- 1882: Station opened
- 30 May 1955: station closed
- 7 August 1956: station reopened
- 17 March 1958: Station closed
- 1992: Line reopened
Location

West Hoathly is a closed railway station on what is now the Bluebell Railway. The station was closed in 1958, but was used by contractors demolishing the line in the 1960s to bring equipment in and out.

== History ==
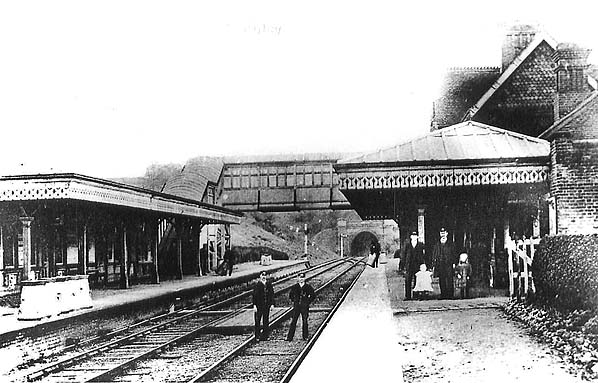
West Hoathly station circa 1905

Despite its name the site of West Hoathly station is actually situated in the village of Sharpthorne, half a mile from the village West Hoathly.

The station opened in 1882, just north of the 731-yard (668 m) long Sharpthorne Tunnel. Along with other stations along the line, all constructed under the influence of the London Brighton and South Coast Railway (LB&SCR), a then substantial provision of £17,000 was made to construct each two-platform through station (the architecture was similar to that now seen at the restored Kingscote). These stations were designed to visually appeal to Victorian London-commuters, who had travelled into the Sussex countryside looking for either a commuter property, or country cottage for the weekend.

Designed by Thomas Myres in the then fashionable "Domestic Revival" style (similar to the later Tudor Revival architecture style), located on the westwards facing No.1 upside platform, the lavish main station building was designed as a two-storey villa with a T-shaped footprint, with a single storey wing each side: booking office and toilets to the north; waiting room and storage to the south. All of this structure was fronted both sides by a timber-supported hipped canopy, which like all of the other buildings carried a hipped slate roof. The station had substantial sidings and a livestock loading dock located just to the north of No.1 platform. The downside No.2 platform was connected to the main buildings by a 50-foot (15 m) glazed footbridge, and had a similar timber-supported canopy which fronted a wooden waiting room. The signal box was located on the north end of No.2 platform, and also controlled a single siding to the north of platform No.2.

The station layout remained substantially unaltered throughout its operational life. However, it was found after a few years usage that the original external finish to the main station building of timber beams and plaster infill was prone to water ingress, and so in the early 1900s was reformed in the local architectural style by covering the external walls with vertically-hung clay tiles. In the 1930s, the Southern Railway removed many of the superfluous LB&SCR decorations, and shortened the downside facilities to what was basically an open-plan shelter located next to the footbridge.

Commercially on the station site, there was a small brickworks built to the east on land leased from the railway, giving it direct rail access; The brickworks was operated by Ibstock Brick Ltd, producing traditional Stock Bricks. The site closed in 2020 and is now being developed for residential housing. A railway-built and owned "Railway Hotel" opened on the west side of the station forecourt, opposite the main station building. After closure of the railway, it was sold off by the British Railways Property Board and renamed the "Bluebell Inn", reopened as a public house. Closed in 1999, it is now a private residence called "Bluebell House".

Preceding station	Disused railways	Following station
Kingscote; Line and station open	London, Brighton and South Coast Railway; Lewes and East Grinstead Railway	Horsted Keynes; Line and station open

== Closure and demolition ==
The station closed to passengers on 30 May 1955, with the goods yard closed on 13 June. After legal objections to the line's closure, the station reopened to passengers on 7 August 1956, closing permanently on 17 March 1958.

After the closure of the line to all traffic in 1963, the assigned BR contractors took over the site, using its facilities to control removal of track and infrastructure from the entire railway, and using its excellent road access to redistribute the assets. To enable their works, the contractors removed the down-side buildings and footbridge in 1964, and lifted the tracks in 1964/5. The main station building was demolished in late 1967.

== Preservation ==
With a truncated line operating between Sheffield Park and Horsted Keynes, the Bluebell Railway Society purchased the largely levelled and cleared site in 1974. After raising funds to extend the line northwards, the society was faced with much local opposition to the extension, resulting in a public enquiry and resultant planning application. Following approval of the decision by both the Secretary of State for the Environment and Secretary of State for Transport, in 1985, the society was granted the planning permission for the preserved railways extension to East Grinstead, and the right to apply for a light railway order, with the stipulation that West Hoathly would not be redeveloped as a station, due to local residents' concerns about a likely increase in local road traffic. If the society were to decide to undertake such a station redevelopment, it would need to apply for additional planning permission at a later date.

In 1992, the society's extension reached New Coombe Bridge, where a simple run-around loop was provided on the alignment of the former up line through West Hoathly, located just north of the former No.2 platform. Since then, the society – much like the 1960s railway removal contractors – have used the site to store materials for the extension, which were delivered there by road. This allowed the rebuilding of New Coombe Bridge, and opening of the extension northwards to Kingscote in early 1994. With the installation of a run-around loop at Kingscote railway station, the loop just north of West Hoathly was removed, and the line returned to its current single-track, non-stopping configuration.

As part of the extension of the line north from Kingscote, the society needed to contribute £4 million to the cost of removing rubbish from the former Imberhorne landfill site, which had filled in a cutting to a depth of 30 feet (9 m). To help meet the cost, society members agreed to the sale of two plots of land on a former brickworks site to the east of the former station. However to date (2024) this has not occurred.

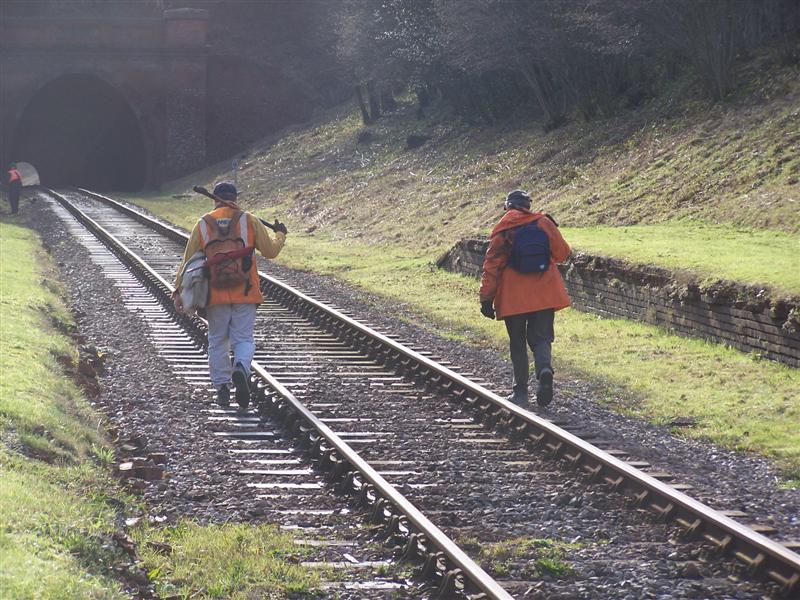
Track workers walking the line through the old station with the tunnel beyond

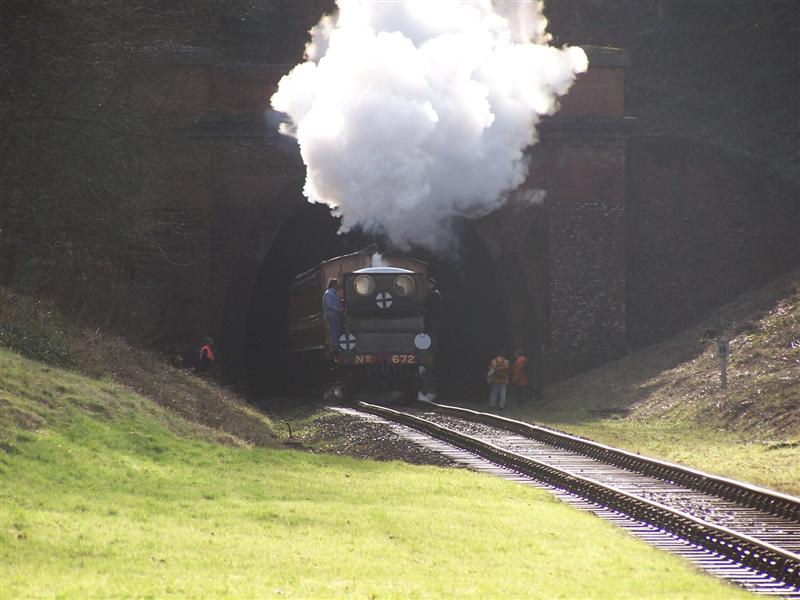
A train with Terrier 672 Fenchurch leading exits the tunnel

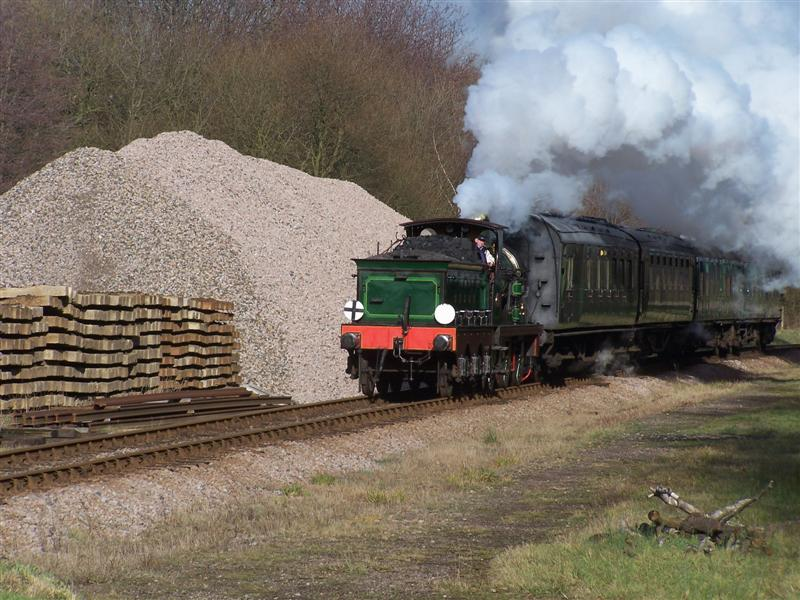
A view of the supplies used to construct the East Grinstead extension delivered here due to the ease of road access

== Future ==
The society has a long term ambition but still no plans or timetable to rebuild the station at West Hoathly. The society believes that in the long term, with substantial residential complexes around the former station site, the station could provide a useful public-transport facility for the residents of West Hoathly and Sharpthorne. West Hoathly Parish Council currently supports the provision of a halt at the site.

However, under current Railway Inspectorate guidelines, it would not be possible to build what would now be considered a "new" station on the former site, as it is located on a gradient. Hence the society believes that any future station at West Hoathly would most likely be located on the level stretch from the end of the goods yard towards New Coombe Bridge, approximately where the former temporary run-around loop was located.

== See also ==
- List of closed railway stations in Britain
