= St Margaret's Church, West Hoathly =

Church in West Sussex, England

St Margaret's Church
- Church of St Margaret of Antioch
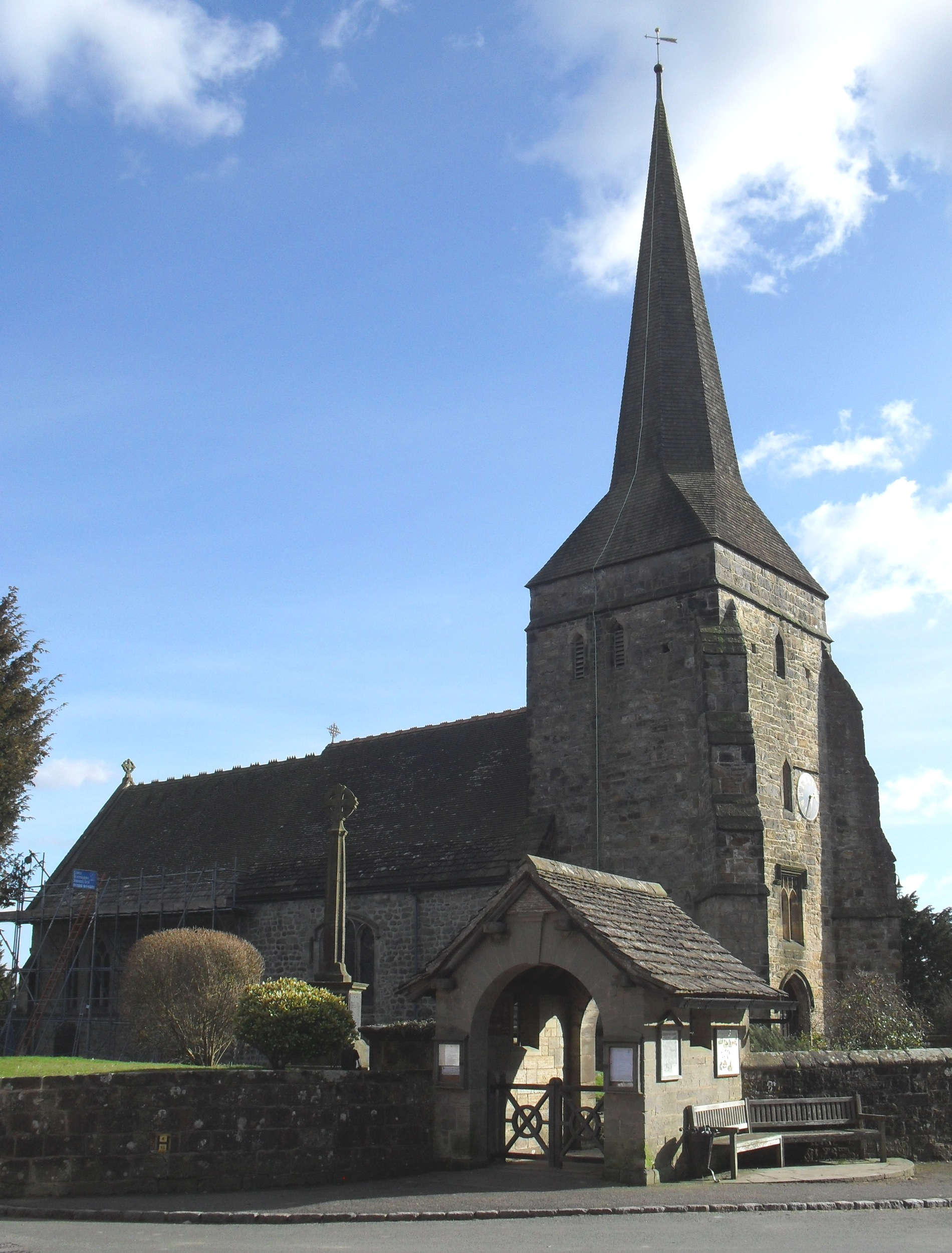
- The church from the northwest
- St Margaret's Church
- 51.0766°N 0.0557°W
- Location: North Lane, West Hoathly, West Sussex RH19 4PP
- Country: England
- Denomination: Church of England
- Website: www.westhoathly.org.uk

History
- Status: Parish church
- Founded: 11th century
- Dedication: Margaret of Antioch

Architecture
- Functional status: Active
- Heritage designation: Grade I
- Designated: 28 October 1957
- Style: Norman architecture

Administration
- Province: Canterbury
- Diocese: Chichester
- Archdeaconry: Horsham
- Deanery: Rural Deanery of Cuckfield
- Parish: West Hoathly

Clergy
- Vicar: Reverend Heather Wilkin

St Margaret's Church (dedicated in full to St Margaret of Antioch) is an Anglican church in the village of West Hoathly in Mid Sussex, one of seven local government districts in the English county of West Sussex.

By the late 11th century, a simple single-room stone building existed on the high, open ridge upon which the village developed. A series of medieval expansions doubled its size by the 15th century, and the present building has changed little since then—despite a Victorian restoration overseen by architect R. H. Carpenter. A major addition was the heavily buttressed Perpendicular Gothic west tower, topped with a tall broach spire and containing a peal of ancient bells. The large, steeply terraced churchyard also serves as a public cemetery and has far-reaching views across the Weald. The original dedication to Saint Margaret of Antioch fell out of use for many centuries until a researcher rediscovered it. The church serves a large rural parish which was reduced in size in 1882 when two residents of the hamlet of Highbrook paid for an additional church to be built there. English Heritage has listed it at Grade I for its architectural and historical importance.

== History ==
West Hoathly stands on a high ridge in the Weald, 4 miles (6.4 km) south-southwest of the ancient market town of East Grinstead. Worth, now part of the Crawley urban area but originally a large parish with a Saxon church, lies a similar distance to the northwest. The land rises to 600 feet (180 m) just outside the village, and outcrops of sandstone (such as the mushroom-shaped "Great-on-Little") are nearby. The area was already settled by the 11th century, and names recorded at that time include Hadlega and Hodlega — later standardised to Hodlegh and Hothelegh, then (West) Hoathly. In the Sussex dialect, the pronunciation "West Ho'ly" is sometimes heard.

The Domesday survey of 1086 did not mention a church or settlement at West Hoathly, but architectural evidence suggests that the core the present church dates from about 1090, when it would have been merely "a little Norman building". At that time it would have been a simple single-cell structure consisting of a nave and chancel and "possibly ... an apse". It was situated overlooking the surrounding forests on the ridge which forms the watershed between rivers flowing north towards the Thames and south towards the English Channel. Along with the church at Rotherfield, it was — and remains — the only ancient church in the whole of the Weald to stand right on the crest of this ridge.

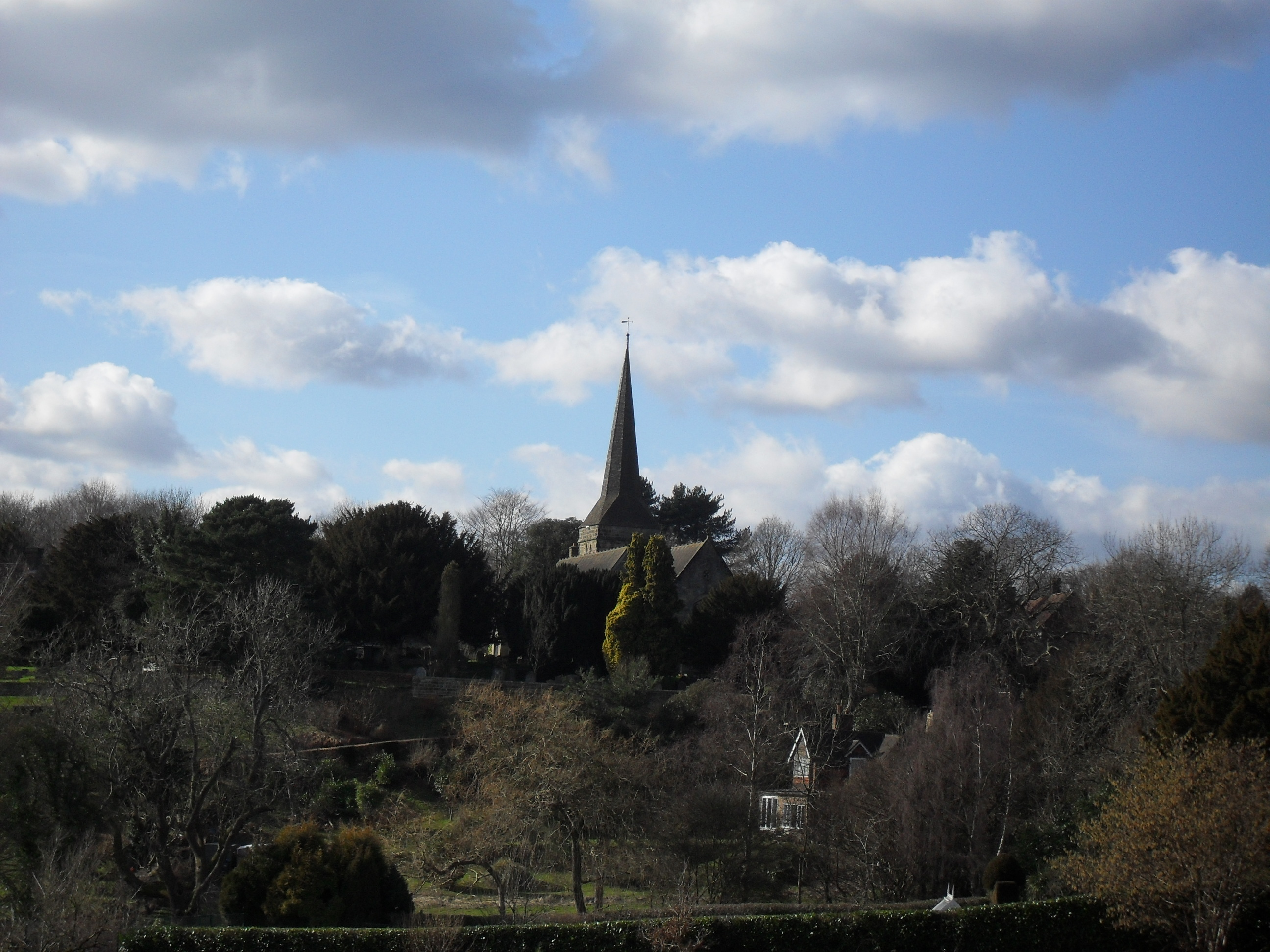
The tall broach spire, seen here from the fields southeast of the village, was added in the early 15th century.

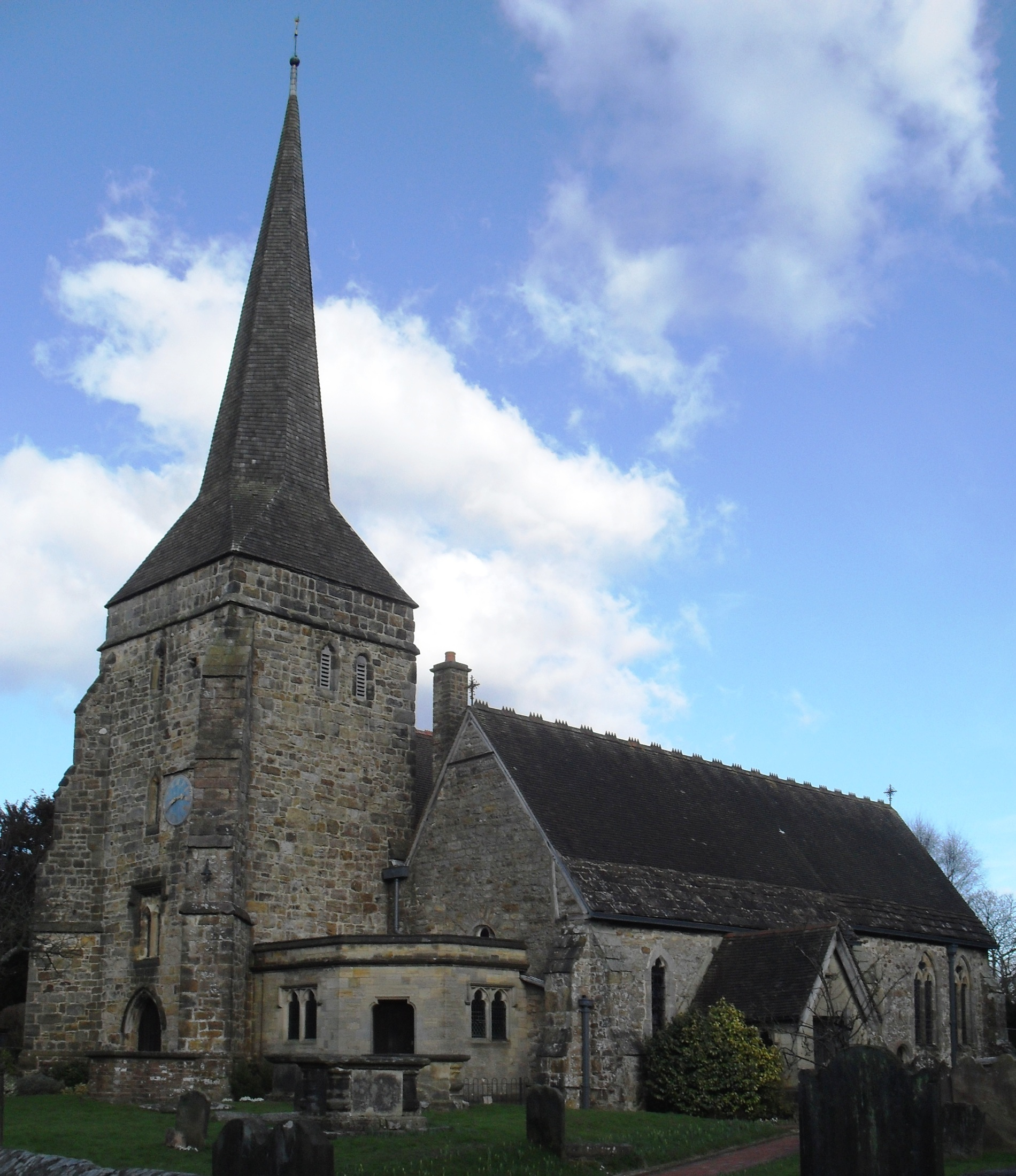
The vestry (centre foreground) and porch were 19th-century additions.

Within a century, the church underwent the first of several major structural alterations which have resulted in "seven different medieval styles [and] building periods" being represented. Around the end of the 12th century, the nave was extended by the addition of a south aisle, for which the south wall of the nave was removed. A "typical Norman arcade" was inserted in its place.

Next, about 1200, the west end of the chancel was altered and the chancel arch leading to the nave was removed without replacement. More significant and "far more interesting" work was then undertaken on the chancel in the third quarter of the 13th century: it was extended to the east, making it longer than the nave — a very rare pattern, whose only equivalent in a Sussex parish church is St Laurence's Church at Guestling according to one authority. A pair of windows, one a lancet and the other a plain two-light opening set below a quatrefoil, were inserted in the north wall, around 1250; they are "a most remarkable example of the beginnings of tracery". The fifth stage of development consisted of the construction of a Lady chapel on the south side in about 1270.

A two-bay arcade supported on octagonal piers separated this from the chancel. Early in the 14th century, a sixth stage of rebuilding took place: this was a major redevelopment, possibly caused by fire or other structural damage. The narrow south aisle was rebuilt in the Decorated Gothic style to make it wider than the adjacent Lady chapel (this lasted longer than the rest of the contemporary work); an arch was inserted to link the chapel and aisle; diagonal buttresses were added to support the east wall of the chancel; two "rather coarsely executed" windows were inserted in the rebuilt south wall; and a new south entrance, a holy water stoup and a piscina were inserted. At the start of the 15th century, a Perpendicular Gothic tower with "the usual shingled broach spire" was built at the west end. It obscured the nave's original west window, so a new window was inserted in the north wall instead. The church, originally a small and simple building, had "doubled its size in 250 years" as a result of these alterations: "the perfect example of a church steadily expanding ... to fulfil its local requirements".

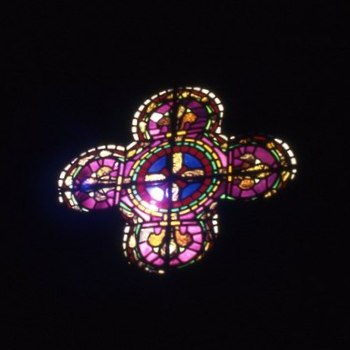
Some windows, such as this quatrefoil, have stained glass.

A new south door was added in 1626: wrought iron nails in the woodwork spell out the date march 31 1626. Earlier, during the Jacobean era, a pulpit with scrollwork-decorated panelling was installed. A wooden gallery was built at the west end in 1723. Re-shingling of the spire was carried out in 1731 (by craftsmen from Rotherfield, well-known locally for its shingling industry), 1734 and 1741, when part of the south wall of the chancel was also shingled to make it damp-proof.

The church was restored in 1870 by William Slater and Richard Herbert Carpenter. They removed many 17th-century features, added a porch and vestry (described in 1935 as "perfectly deplorable examples"), tiled the floor and re-roofed the nave and chancel. Slater and Carpenter's work, directed by the latter, has been called "unnecessarily costly", but their work on the chancel work was praised as "enterprising" by Nikolaus Pevsner. Further work took place in 1935, undertaken by W.H. Shelford. The glazed tiles and wood flooring were removed, revealing old tombs including one dating from 1624 near the altar rails, and the floor was relaid in stone. The altar, which had been placed on a step, was lowered to its original height again. A new set of altar rails were also installed, and were positioned to run straight across the chancel; they were not newly constructed, but dated from the late 17th century and apparently came from St Mary's Church, Barcombe. They were bought in an antique shop in The Lanes in Brighton.

In 1935, the church's dedication to Saint Margaret of Antioch—rare in England—was rediscovered, having been lost for centuries. A member of the Sussex Archaeological Society found a 13th-century document with details of the dedication while undertaking research.

== Architecture ==
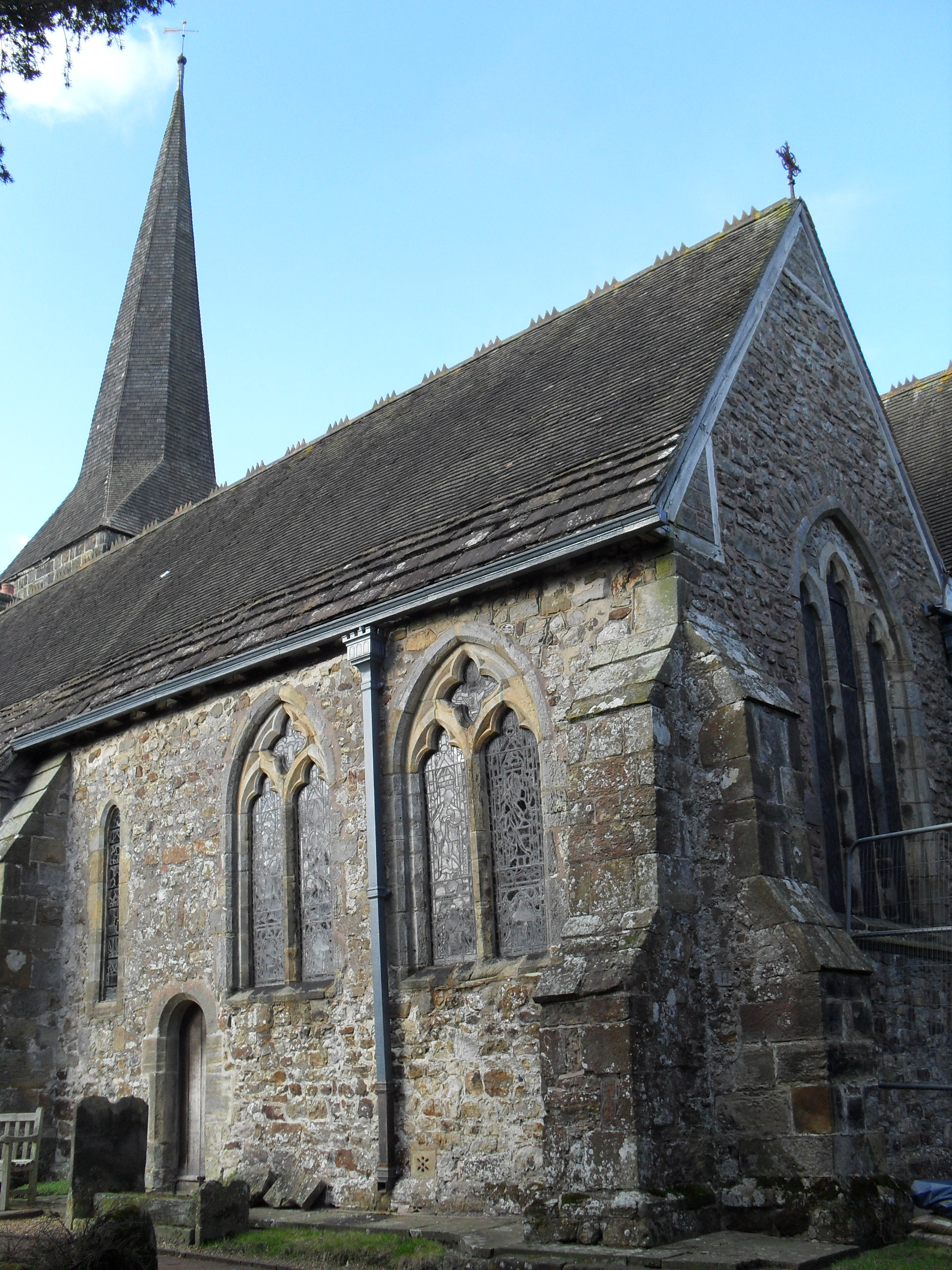
The church is built of sandstone rubble.

Descriptions of St Margaret's Church include "large and interesting", "the main point of interest ... [in] a village full of charm and beauty", and "a rather typical wealden church ... seeming from every side to form an integral part of the landscape". In this respect it is similar to many ancient churches in the area, established by Norman settlers in forest clearings in the Weald—then a remote area with little access. It is built of sandstone rubble quarried from the local area, and has a chancel, nave, Lady chapel and adjacent aisle on the south side, tower with an octagonal spire, vestry in the southwest corner and an entrance porch. The stone is laid in wide courses. Some of the quoins have stone dressings, and Horsham Stone slabs and tiles cover the roof. Although this layout is straightforward and common, the parts are not perfectly aligned and the nave is slightly wider than the chancel on both sides. The dimensions of the nave are 32 1/2 by 18 1/2 feet (9.9 m × 5.6 m); of the chancel, 37 by 18 1/2 feet (11.3 m × 5.6 m); of the Lady chapel, 25 by 15 1/2 feet (7.6 m × 4.7 m); of the aisle, 32 1/2 by 16 feet (9.9 m × 4.9 m); and of the tower, 12 square feet (1.1 m^{2}). The tower is apparently lower than intended: it extends just 3 feet (0.91 m) above the tops of the corner buttresses. Above it, the "comparatively tall" octagonal broach spire is topped by a copper weather vane.

The oldest fabric dates from the early Norman era: the west and north walls of the nave, built in about 1090, survive. The north wall of the chancel may also be original. The extension of the chancel in the 13th century approximately doubled its length; it was originally square. The arcades leading to the Lady chapel and the aisle are both of two bays; they have conventional Norman octagonal piers and "fat short round piers" respectively. The arches of the aisle arcade have double chamfers. The south aisle was widened in the Decorated Gothic style in about 1330. A round-arched doorway dating from the 12th century was moved to the Lady chapel, and the string course on the outer wall may also have been moved there from the original south wall of the chancel, which was removed to make way for the chapel. The chancel arch was taken out in the 13th century (although the Victoria County History of Sussex gives 15th century, coinciding with the installation of a rood).

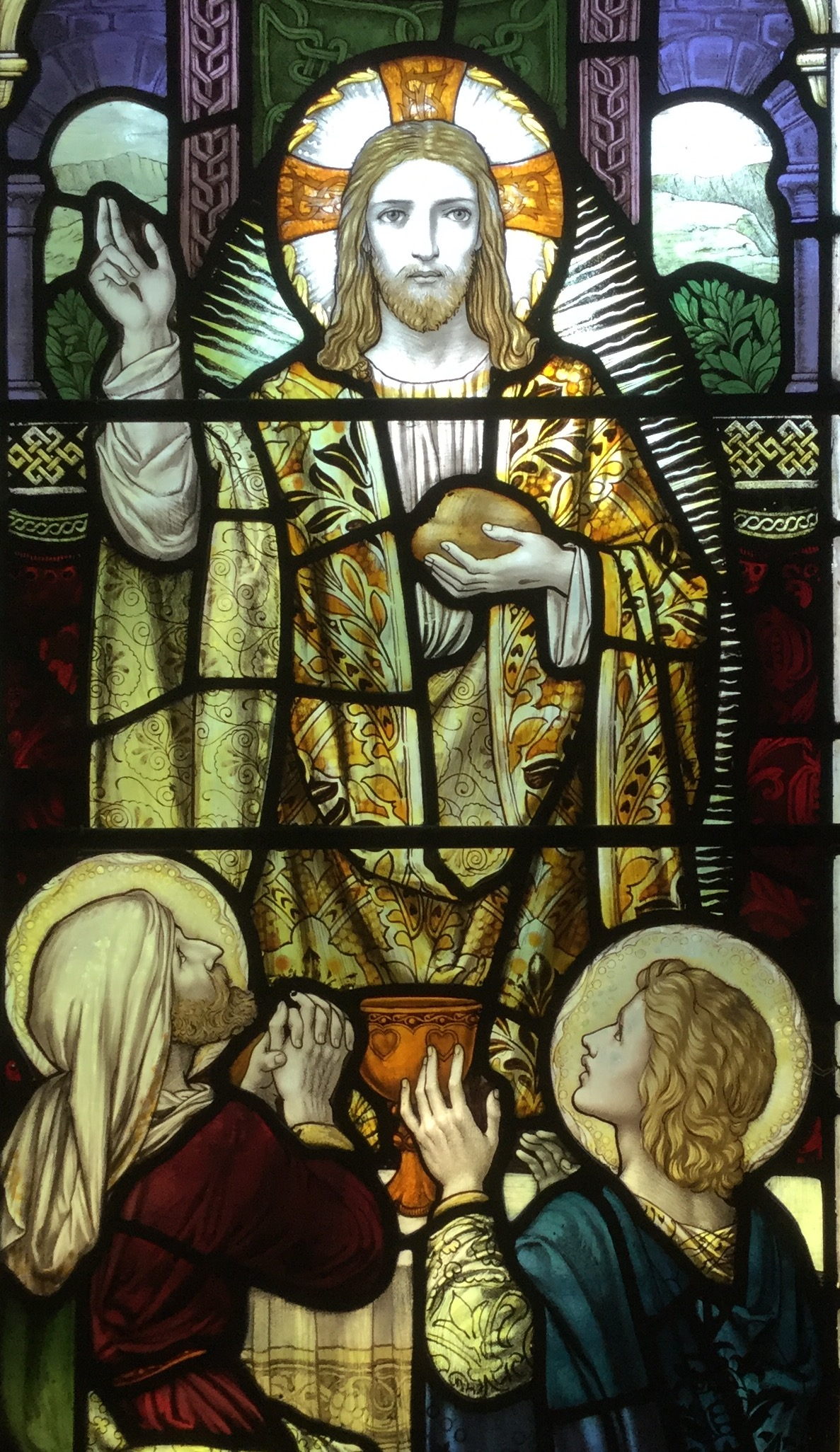
Stained glass window made by James Powell and Sons

There are windows of various dates, and others were removed during the frequent extensions and alterations. The east window of the chancel was altered during the 17th and 20th centuries, but has 13th-century origins in the form of chamfered vertical sections with moulded splays. There are three lights set into a pointed-arched recess. A similar window is set in the east wall of the Lady chapel. Most of the other windows in the chancel are 13th- and 14th-century lancets, including one that is now blocked. Some are trefoil- or quatrefoil-headed. The Lady chapel is lit by a pairt of two-light windows with trefoil heads and a quatrefoil above, both with plate tracery. There is also one smaller lancet window. One original 11th-century opening survives in the nave wall, but it is now blocked. The other windows are 15th-century, arched and hood-moulded. Two ogee-headed windows dating from about 1330, and representing "a further advance in design" on the slightly earlier windows of the Lady chapel, are in the wall of the south aisle.

The "heavy, low" two-stage tower, again built of sandstone rubble, is supported by four-stage diagonal buttresses. It is topped with ashlar; the shingled broach spire sits on this. There are some small 15th- and 16th-century windows of various styles. A two-centred arch with chamfered columns and mouldings gives access from the nave.

Inside, there is a 12th-century font of Sussex Marble. It was repaired in the 19th century using the similar Purbeck Marble, as the supply of local material from the quarries at Petworth was exhausted. The south aisle has an 8-foot (2.4 m) chest believed to be about 800 years old; another, dating from the 16th or 17th century but with a renewed lid, stands in the vestry. Also in the vestry are three early 17th-century cast iron grave tablets commemorating members of the locally important Infeld family of Gravetye Manor. On the earlier two, dated 1612 and 1624, text is engraved directly on the ironwork. The other, dated 1635, has a much rarer feature: a brass plate attached to the slab.

Medieval wall-paintings and murals were once a common feature in Sussex churches, but many have been lost. Figurative scenes predominated, but representations of foliage were sometimes painted in awkward locations such as sloping walls. Few of these decorative images survive, but at St Margaret's Church some painted vines are visible in one of the window splays. The "very delicate painting" is on the inside of one of the windows in the chancel's south wall, which was inserted in the mid-13th century. The present west gallery was erected in 1899 as a replacement for the original, installed in 1723 but removed during Slater and Carpenter's renovations of 1870.

== Stained glass ==
The church has a number of stained glass windows. Two are war memorials from World War One. The larger of the two is by Douglas Strachan and is a three light window in the north wall commemorating Major William Arbuthnot. The smaller window of Sir Galahad is by WE Tower of the workshop of Charles Eamer Kempe and is a single lancet in the south wall commemorating Arbuthnot's nephew Captain Archie Middleton who fell in the same action in 1915. There is a further window by Charles Eamer Kempe at the west end of the South wall behind the entrance door. This is a memorial window to Helen Middleham Arbuthnot. Both Kempe windows are signed, the Arbuthnot window by Kempe with his wheat sheaf mark and the Galahad window by WE Tower who signed his work with a tower within Kempe's wheatsheaf.

The East window, Christ in Majesty, is by Clayton & Bell. On the south side there are two further two light Clayton and Bell windows (1891) showing a) Mary Magdalene washing Christ's feet, b) Noli Me Tangere, and c) the Publican and the Pharisees. The window immediately on the east of the main door on the south wall is a two light window by James Powell and Sons. It portrays The Supper at Emmaus and Christ baptising.

== Churchyard ==
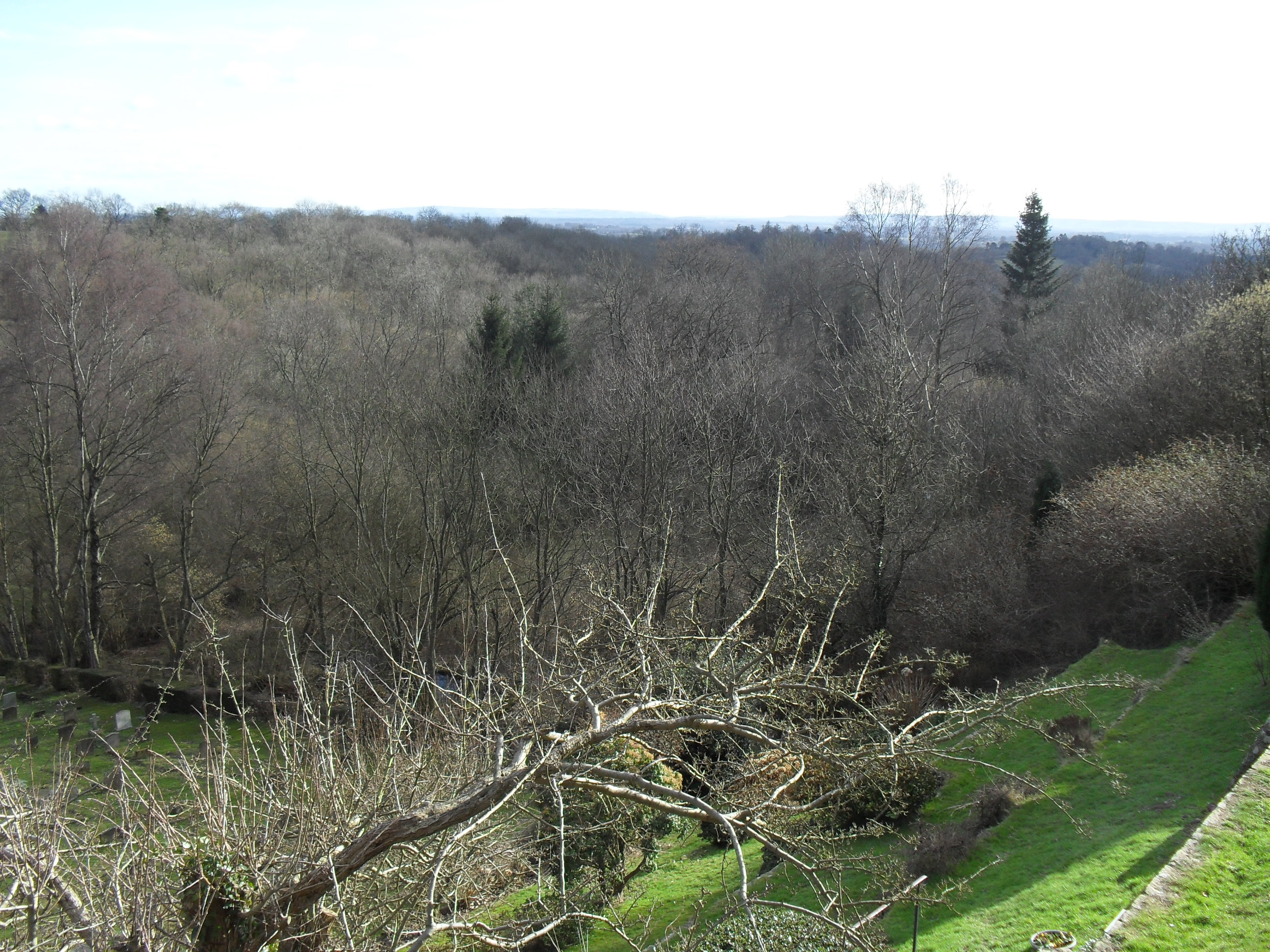
The churchyard is terraced in six stages, and gives "extraordinarily beautiful" southward views.

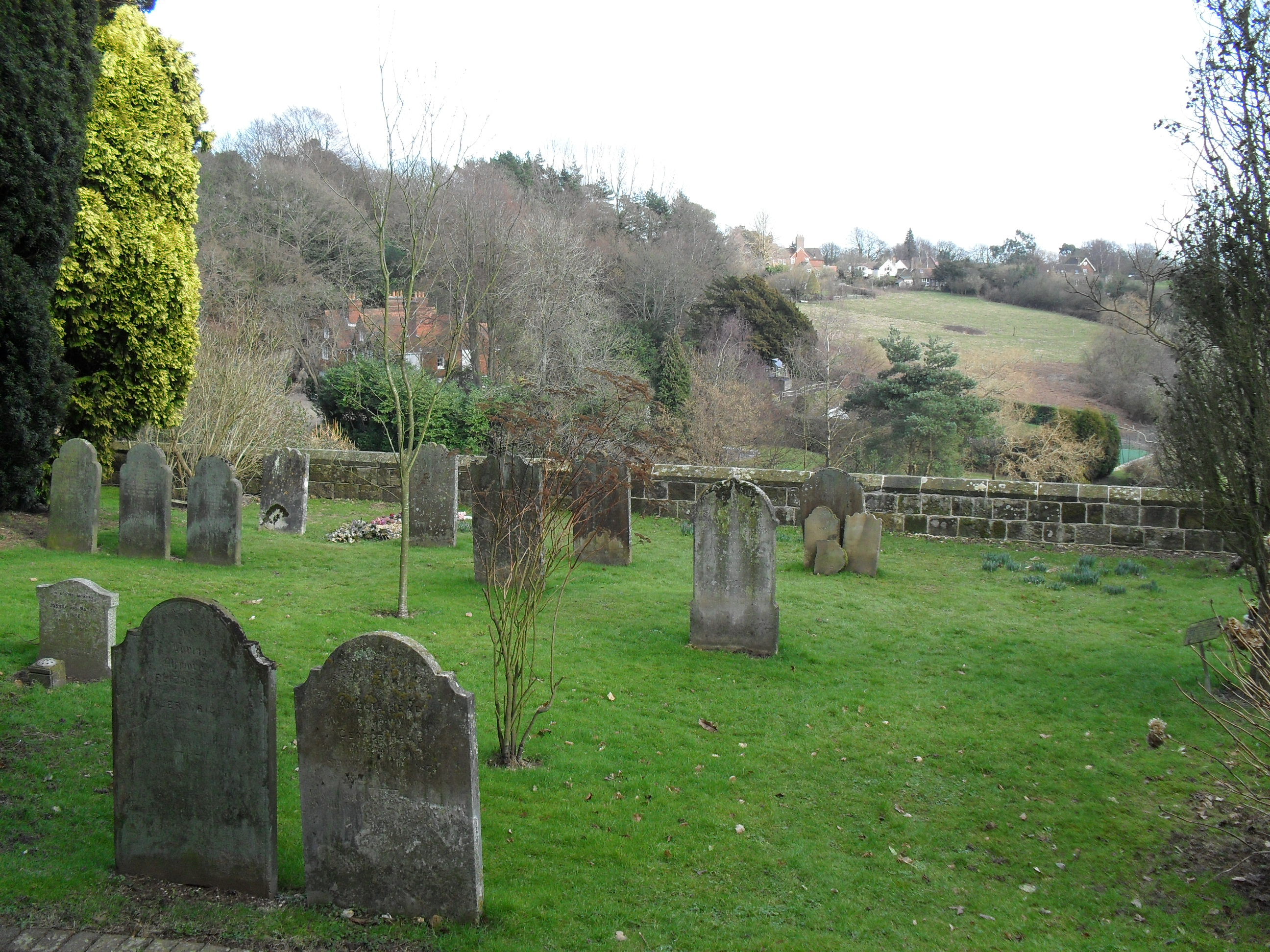
Historically, the walls were maintained by the landowners of the parish.

St Margaret's Church has an extensive terraced churchyard with far-reaching southward views across the Weald to the South Downs. Set across six levels, it is heavily planted with trees and flowers—more than 100 species have been documented—and has several seats and a signposted viewing area. It has been extended several times. One extension, described in 1935 as "recent", brought an artificial cave, possibly of medieval origin, into its boundaries. It is hewn out of the rock near the floor of the valley above which the churchyard sits.

An ancient Sussex custom, also encountered at a few other churches nearby (such as those at Lindfield and Ardingly), applied for many years at West Hoathly: every landowner in the parish was responsible for the upkeep of a specific section of the churchyard wall. Each person was listed and the piece of wall they had to maintain was marked. A list dated 1752 survives, showing 60 landowners' names. Some parts of the wall still have initials and dates inscribed upon them.

As well as serving the church, the churchyard is licensed as a public burial ground. The Diocese of Chichester does not directly manage it: instead it is looked after by the Parochial Church Council, who (along with the Friends of the Churchyard Trust, an independent body) pay for maintenance and improvements. The Heritage Lottery Fund awarded the church a grant in 1996 to restore many of the ancient tombs.

== Bells ==
The church has a peal of six bells. One bell is from 1510; one from 1581 (both of these are listed as being of historical significance);); two are from 1712; one 1887; and the newest, the treble, from 1937. Details of the bells are as follows:

1. Cast by Mears & Stainbank (Whitechapel Bell Foundry), 1937
2. W. Griffeth, Vicar, Brinklow & T. Paine, Churchwardens. / R. Phelp made me 1712 (Note: Richard Phelps [sic] was master of the Whitechapel Bell Foundry in London from 1701 until 1738. He also cast bell 3.)
3. Sancta Maria Ora Pro Nobis
4. Mr. William Griffeth, Vicar. John Brinklow & Thomas Paine, Churchwardens. 1712.
5. joseph carter made me Better / 1581. (Note: This bell recast in 1887 by John Taylor & Co of Loughborough, presumably retaining a previous inscription.)
6. Blessed Be the name of the Lorde. / 1581 joseph carter

The wording "Joseph Carter made me better" suggests that bell 5 was restored in 1581 rather than being newly cast in that year (and it was recast again in 1887). A reference to a bell in a will of 1554, when John Bryan wrote "Also I bequeth unto the church of Westhothleygh to the casting of a bell vj s viij d", (Note: i.e. six shillings and eightpence, or 80 old pence.) may refer to bell 3, which was cast in the early 16th century by Thomas Bullisdon, another London-based bell-founder. An additional treble to bring the old ring of five to six, was added in the 20th century.

== The church today ==
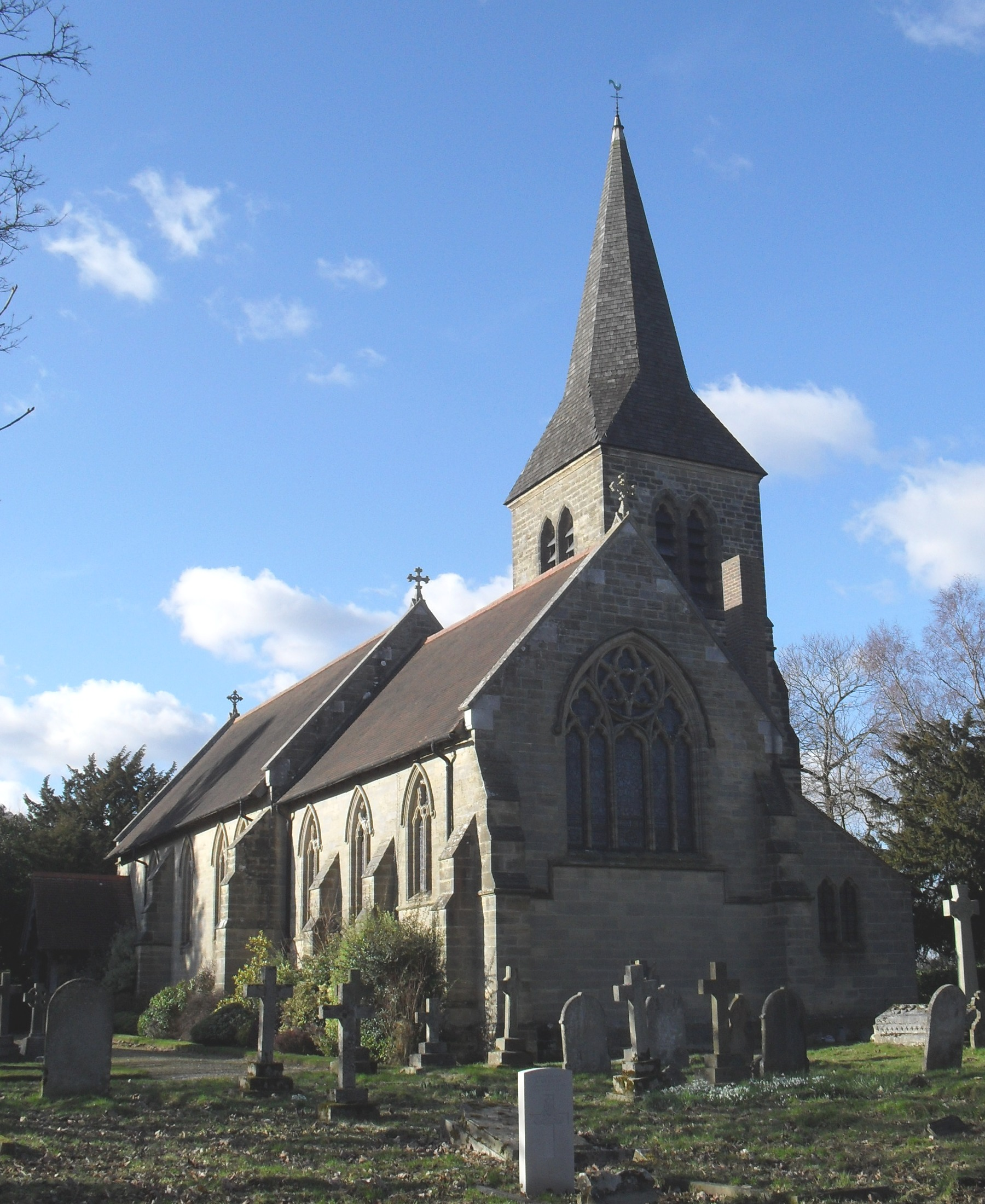
All Saints Church, Highbrook was built in 1882. Its parish used to be part of West Hoathly's, and the two parishes are now part of a united benefice.

St Margaret's Church was listed at Grade I by English Heritage on 28 October 1957. Such buildings are defined as being of "exceptional interest" and greater than national importance. As of February 2001, it was one of 16 Grade I listed buildings, and 1,028 listed buildings of all grades, in the district of Mid Sussex.

The ecclesiastical parish of West Hoathly covers a large rural area of West Sussex near the towns of East Grinstead (to the north), Haywards Heath (to the south) and Crawley (to the west). Ashdown Forest lies to the east. The parish boundaries are not coterminous with those of the civil parish of the same name; they take in the villages of West Hoathly and Sharpthorne and the fields and farms surrounding them. Although the ecclesiastical parish of Highbrook has been separate ever since All Saints Church was built in 1882 on the initiative of two wealthy sisters who lived in the hamlet, the parishes are informally "twinned" and are part of a united benefice with the official title The Benefice of Highbrook and West Hoathly. This was formed in September 1975.

The advowson (the right to appoint clergy) was first recorded the last decade of the 11th century, when it was held by Ralph de Cheyney of St Pancras Priory at Lewes on behalf of William de Warenne, 2nd Earl of Surrey. The Bishop of Chichester was authorised to hold the advowson from 1346, but in the late 14th century (in 1391 according to one source) the church was appropriated again by Lewes Priory. This relationship ceased after the Dissolution of the Monasteries in 1538; the advowson then passed in turn to Thomas Cromwell, Anne of Cleves and then The Crown.

== See also ==
- All Saints Church, Highbrook
- Grade I listed buildings in West Sussex
- List of places of worship in Mid Sussex

== Bibliography ==
- Beevers, David; Marks, Richard; Roles, John (1989). Sussex Churches and Chapels. Brighton: The Royal Pavilion, Art Gallery and Museums. ISBN 0-948723-11-4.
- Black, Adam; Black, Charles (2000) [1861]. Black's 1861 Guide to Sussex (Facsimile of original publication). Black's Guides: South-Eastern Counties of England. Bakewell: Country Books. ISBN 1-898941-21-1.
- Coppin, Paul (2006). 101 Medieval Churches of West Sussex. Seaford: S.B. Publications. ISBN 1-85770-306-5.
- Fisher, E. A. (1970). The Saxon Churches of Sussex. Newton Abbot: David & Charles. ISBN 0-7153-4946-5.
- Hannah, Ian C. (1935). "West Hoathly Church". Sussex Archaeological Collections. 35. Oxford: Sussex Archaeological Society/Oxford University Press: 201–211. doi:10.5284/1086642.
- Hannah, Ian C. (February 1936). "Addenda to the Account of West Hoathly Church in S.A.C., 1935". Sussex Notes and Queries. 6 (1). Lewes: Sussex Archaeological Society: 23.
- Hooper, Wilfrid (November 1938). "Sussex Church Marks". Sussex Notes and Queries. 7 (4). Lewes: Sussex Archaeological Society: 125.
- Nairn, Ian; Pevsner, Nikolaus (1965). The Buildings of England: Sussex. Harmondsworth: Penguin Books. ISBN 0-14-071028-0.
- Pé, Diana (2006). Mid Sussex Church Walks. PP (Pé Publishing). ISBN 0-9543690-2-5.
- Salter, Mike (2000). The Old Parish Churches of Sussex. Malvern: Folly Publications. ISBN 1-871731-40-2.
- Swinfen, Warden; Arscott, David (1984). Hidden Sussex. Brighton: BBC Radio Sussex. ISBN 0-9509510-0-5.
- Vigar, John (1986). Exploring Sussex Churches. Rainham: Meresborough Books. ISBN 0-948193-09-3.
- Wales, Tony (1999). The West Sussex Village Book. Newbury: Countryside Books. ISBN 1-85306-581-1.
- Whiteman, Ken; Whiteman, Joyce (1998). Ancient Churches of Sussex. Seaford: S.B. Publications. ISBN 1-85770-154-2.
