= Richard Phelps (bellfounder) =

English bellfounder (c. 1670 – 1738)

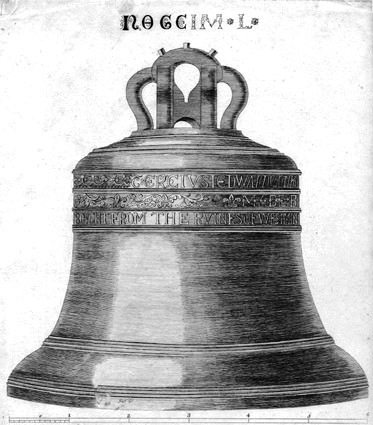
A print depicting Great Tom, circa 1776

Richard Phelps (c.1670 – 1738) was born in Avebury, Wiltshire, England. Phelps was a bellfounder, or a maker of bells, primarily for churches. He was master of the Whitechapel Bell Foundry in London from 1701 to 1738, and is best known for his large bell, Great Tom, in the steeple of St Paul's Cathedral in London, England. The foundry, in operation since at least 1570, was listed by the Guinness Book of Records as the oldest manufacturing company in Great Britain.

== Whitechapel foundry owner ==
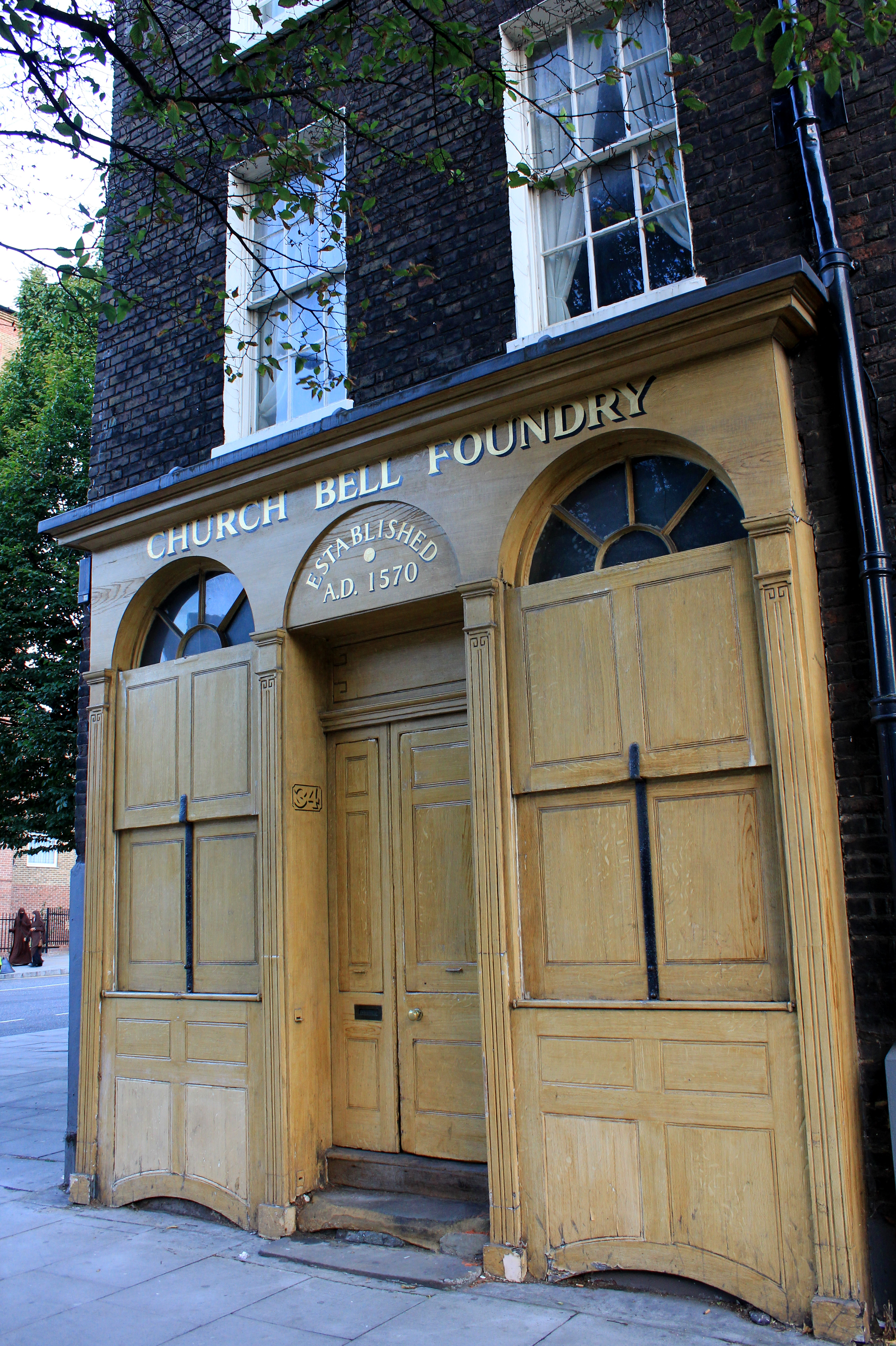
The Entrance to the Whitechapel Bell Foundry on Whitechapel Rd.

Little is known of Phelps before he became owner of Whitechapel. He took over the foundry on the death of the former foundry owner James Bartlett in January, 1701. Phelps remained as the head of the foundry for thirty-seven years, during which time the business grew to be the most successful in the kingdom. The bells that the foundry made were installed in many locations across England. Among his most well-known bells used to be hung in the steeples of St Michael-upon-Cornhill; St Magnus the Martyr; All Hallows, Lombard Street; St Andrew, Holborn; and Cambridge (Great St Mary's), and there is still a bell at St Paul's Cathedral. It was customary for bellfounders to add an inscription to their bells. Phelps’ inscriptions were typically much longer than his predecessors. For example, the following inscription used to appear on the tenth bell of St Michael-upon-Cornhill until it was recast in 2011:

TO PRAYERS WE DO CALL ST MICHAEL’S PEOPLE ALL WE HONOUR TO THE KIND AND JOY TO BRIDES DO SING / TRIUMPHS WE LOUDLY TELL AND RING THE DEAD MANS KNELL

The Whitechapel foundry was very prosperous under the ownership of Richard Phelps. Lukis cites the inscription on the tenor bell at Avebury, Wilts, Richard Phelps, London, Nat. par. hujus 1719 as indicating Phelps was born there.

== Bells for St Paul's Cathedral ==
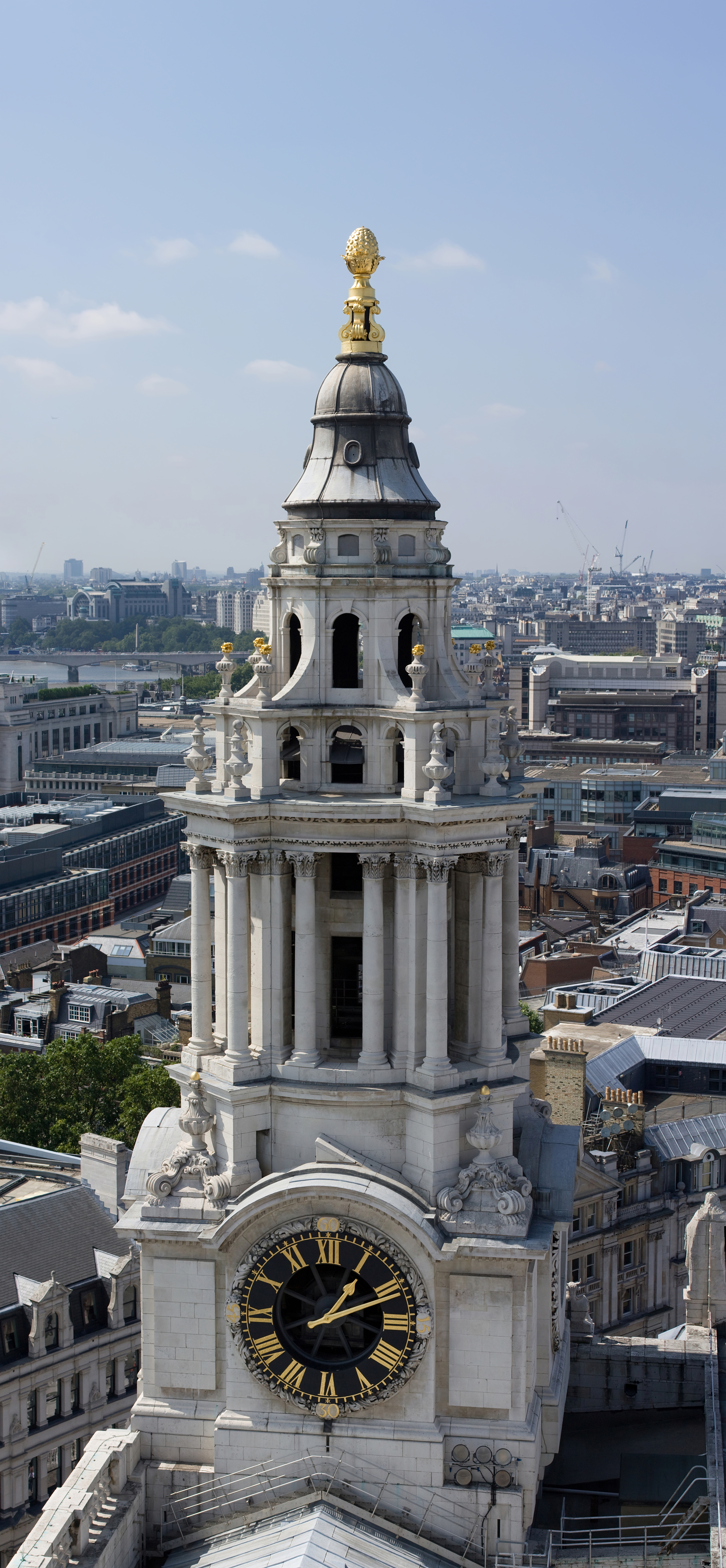
The South West Tower of St Paul's Cathedral, London, containing Great Paul (Bourdon), Great Tom (hour bell), and two quarter jacks

Phelps’ most famous bell is Great Tom at St Paul's Cathedral in London, England. The history of this bell began long before Phelps’ involvement with it. In 1698, King William III gave the bells from St Stephen's Chapel to the newly rebuilt St Paul’s. The largest of these bells was originally called Edward I or Edward of Westminster, and was later known as Great Tom of Westminster. The name "Great Tom" is thought to be a corruption of grand ton, referencing its deep, sonorous tone. It then weighed 82 long hundredweight (9,200 lb; 4,200 kg).

In 1699, while the bell was being moved to St Paul’s, it fell off its carriage and was cracked. Bell Yard at Temple Bar received its name from this event. The bell remained in a shed in the yard of St Paul's Cathedral until 1708 when it was recast by Philip Wightman at a weight of approximately 73 long hundredweight (8,200 lb; 3,700 kg) and hung in the south west tower. The recasting was a failure.

In 1709, Richard Phelps cast a new bell, which was delivered to the Cathedral before the old one was taken away, but the new bell also failed. Nine years later Phelps was given the job of recasting it once again. The present bell is described by Phelps’ successors Charles and George Mears as being 6 feet 9 inches (2.06 m) in diameter, 6 feet 4.5 inches (1.943 m), and with thickness at sound bow 5.25 inches (133 mm), and weighing 76 long hundredweight (8,500 lb; 3,900 kg). The larger part of the metal of which it is made came from Great Tom of Westminster. It bears the inscription:

RICHARD PHELPS MADE ME. 1716.

The bell, which hangs in the South West Tower of the cathedral is “only used for tolling the hour, and for tolling at the death and funeral of a member of the royal family, the Bishop of London, the Dean of the Cathedral, or the Lord Mayor”. An exception was made for the death of American President James Garfield. In 1717, Richard Phelps cast two more bells that were added as quarter jacks. Still in use today, the first weighs 13 long hundredweight (1,500 lb; 660 kg), is 41 inches (1,000 mm) in diameter and is tuned to A flat; the second weighs 35 long hundredweight (3,900 lb; 1,800 kg) and is 58 inches (1,500 mm) in diameter and is tuned to E flat.

== Other churches ==
He cast a large number of bells for London churches, including the tenor bell at St Margaret's Church in West Hoathly, West Sussex, which is inscribed:

W. Griffeth, Vicar, Brinklow & T. Paine, Churchwardens. / R. Phelp made me 1712 [sic].

On 5 September 1726, Richard Phelps and church wardens James Smith and Charles Ball of St Dionis Backchurch reached an agreement for a set of eight new bells and frames. Included in the deal was the exchange of the old bells. The agreement was later amended to include two more bells and frames.

The bells at St Magnus the Martyr, London Bridge were formed a ring of ten with a tenor of 21 long hundredweight (2,400 lb; 1,100 kg). Succeeding a ring of five, the back eight were cast in 1714 by Richard Phelps, ten years after the spire was built, and the trebles very soon after. These bells were scrapped in 1976.

== Last bell cast ==
The last bell bearing Phelps’ name was the priests’ bell at St George's Cathedral, Southwark in Southwark, inscribed:

R. Phelps 1738 T. Lester Fecit

Phelps died in 1738, and the order for this bell was completed by his foreman Thomas Lester, to whom he bequeathed his business and the lease of the foundry.

== See also ==
- Whitechapel Bell Foundry
