= Ardingly =

Village and parish in West Sussex, England

Coordinates: 51.048°N 0.078°W

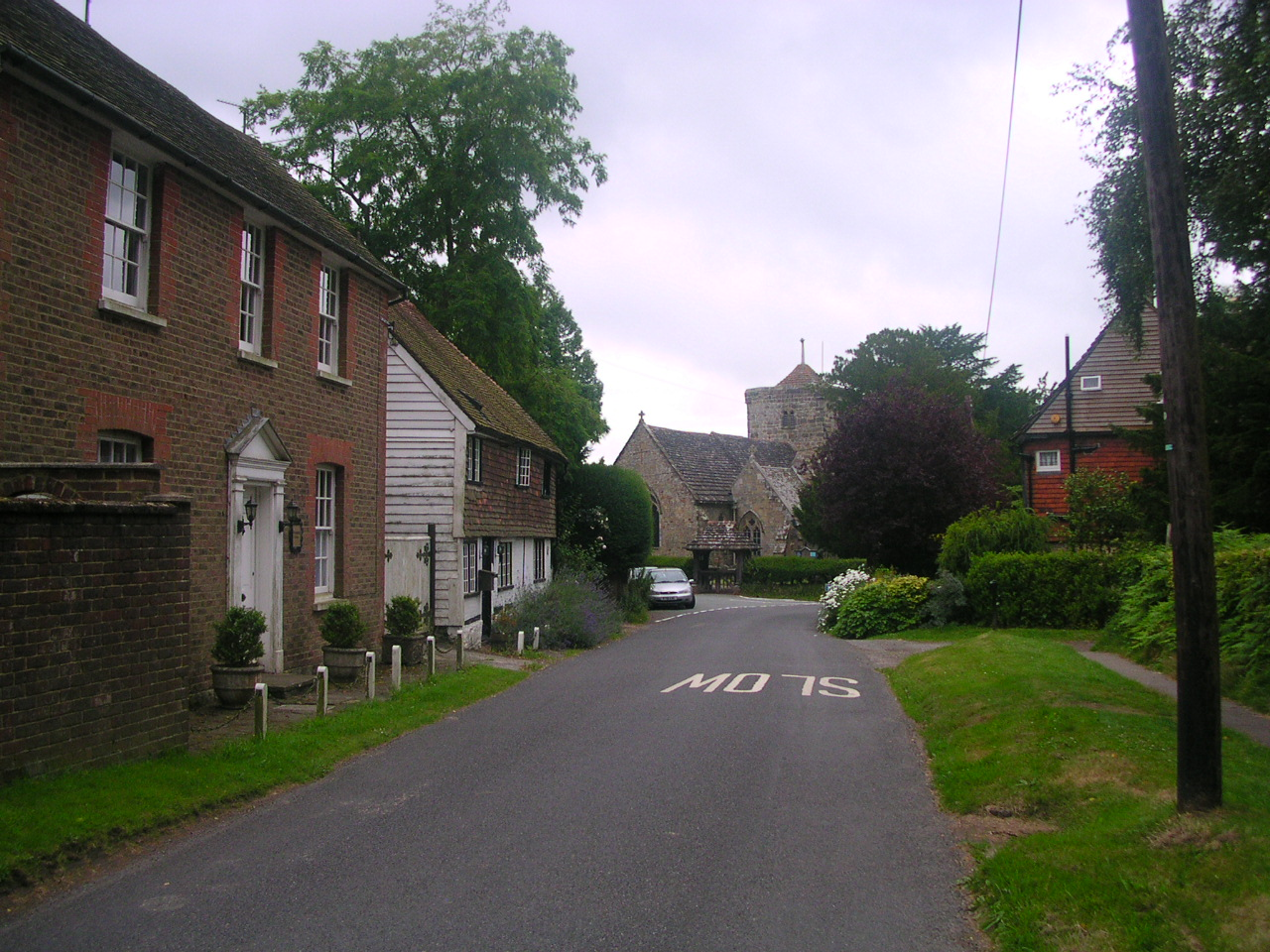
- St. Peter's Parish Church

- Location within West Sussex
- Area: 16.09 km^{2} (6.21 sq mi)
- Population: 1,900
  - Density: 118/km^{2} (310/sq mi)
- OS grid reference: TQ3429
  - London: 31 miles (50 km) N
- Civil parish: Ardingly
- District: Mid Sussex
- Shire county: West Sussex
- Region: South East
- Country: England
- Sovereign state: United Kingdom
- Post town: Haywards Heath
- Postcode district: RH17
- Dialling code: 01444
- Police: Sussex
- Fire: West Sussex
- Ambulance: South East Coast
- UK Parliament: Mid Sussex
- Website: www.ardingly.org

Ardingly (/ˈɑːrdɪŋlaɪ/ AR-ding-lye) is an English village and civil parish in the Mid Sussex district of West Sussex, England. The village is in the High Weald Area of Outstanding Natural Beauty about 33 miles (53 km) south of London and 33 miles (53 km) east-north-east of the county town of Chichester. The parish covers an area of 3,974 acres (1,608 ha). The Office for National Statistics estimated the population in 2022 to be 1,900.

== Heritage ==
There is mention of a place Ertlyngeleghe, in 1396, which may refer to Ardingly.

St Peter's parish church, towards the western end of the village, dates from the 14th century.

Kew's wild botanic garden, Wakehurst (previously known as Wakehurst Place) is about 1.5 miles (2.4 km) north of the village. Ardingly Reservoir is about 1 mile (1.6 km) west of the village. The Big-Upon-Little rock formation is close to a footpath between Ardingly and West Hoathly.

== Events ==
In June the South of England Show early in the month and the London to Brighton cycle event (usually held on Father's Day) attract visitors from a wide area. The South of England Showground hosts regular antiques fairs, some of which have featured on the BBC Television game show Bargain Hunt.

Every four years an international Scout camp is held on the showground, attended by about 3,000 Scouts and Girl Guides from West Sussex and other areas at home and abroad.

== Schools ==
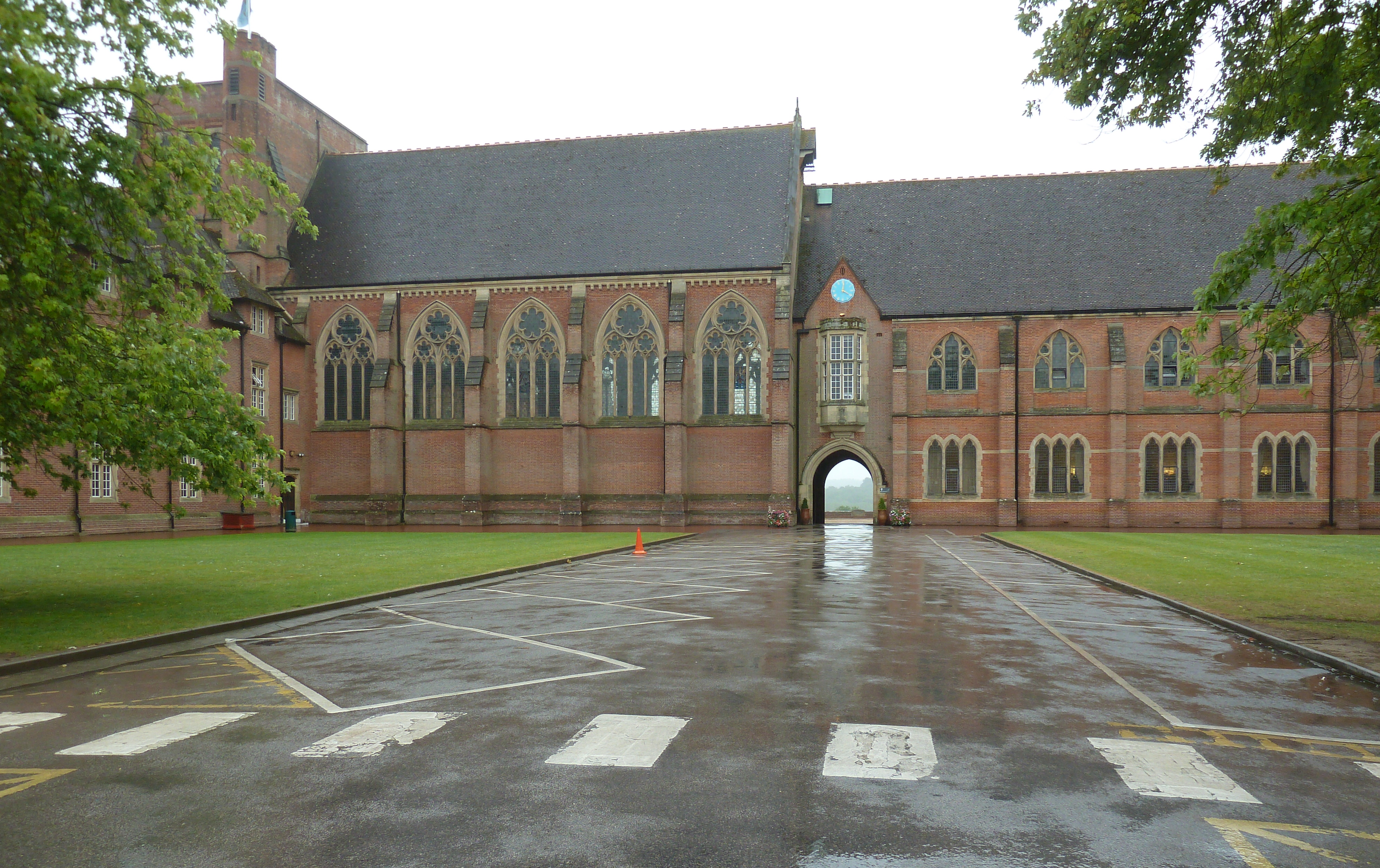
Ardingly College

At the southern edge of the village is Ardingly College, an independent school. The village also has a Church of England primary school, St. Peters CE Primary, with about 120 pupils. Most of the children of secondary-school age attend Oathall Community College in Haywards Heath.

== Public transport ==
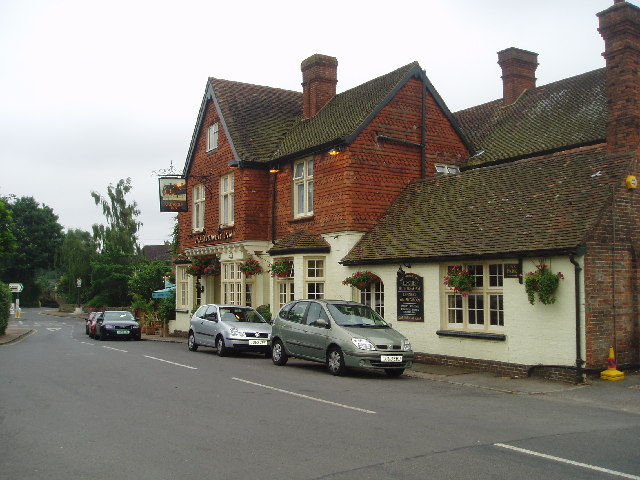
Ardingly Inn

Ardingly has a low-frequency bus service to the nearby towns of Haywards Heath and Crawley.

Ardingly railway station was opened 1 October 1864 by the London, Brighton and South Coast Railway. The Southern Railway electrified the line in the 1930s but British Railways closed the line and station to passenger trains in 1963. The goods yard and connection to the main line remain open as an ARC Aggregates terminal. The nearby Bluebell Railway owns the former trackbed between Ardingly and Horsted Keynes and has a long-term aspiration to re-open the line.

== Notable people ==
- Frances Garnet Wolseley, 2nd Viscountess Wolseley, a celebrated horticulturist and gardening author, moved to Culpepers, Ardingly, in 1920 and died there in 1936.
- Jon Snow, journalist and television presenter, was born in Ardingly in 1947.
