= Great Upon Little =

Rock formation in West Sussex

- Rock formation
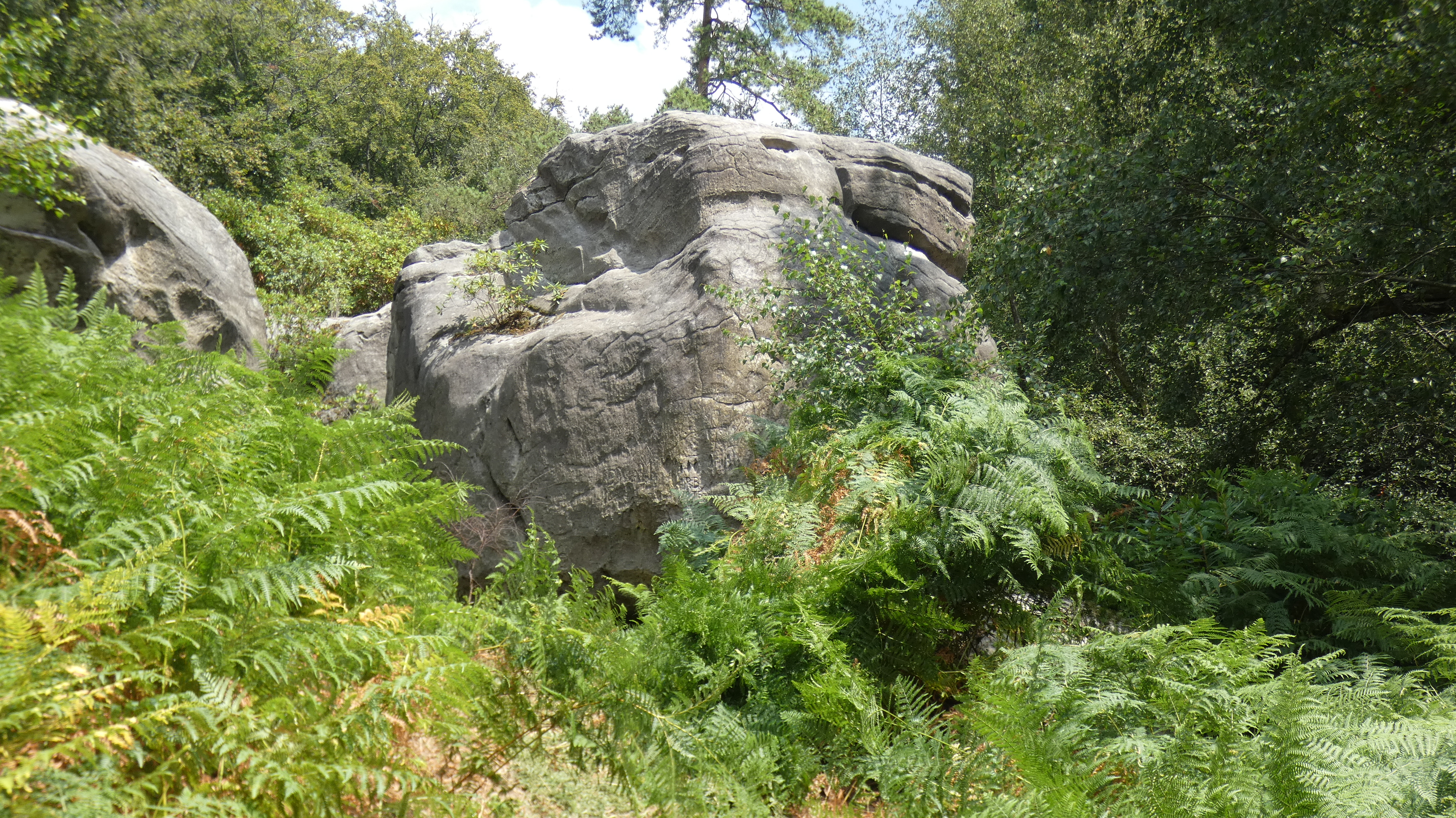
- Great Upon Little

- Location within West Sussex
- Coordinates: 51°04′19″N 0°04′35″W
- Location: West Hoathly, West Sussex, England
- Age: Cretaceous
- Geology: Ardingly Sandstone Member, Tunbridge Wells Sand Formation
- Highest elevation: 125 m (410 ft)

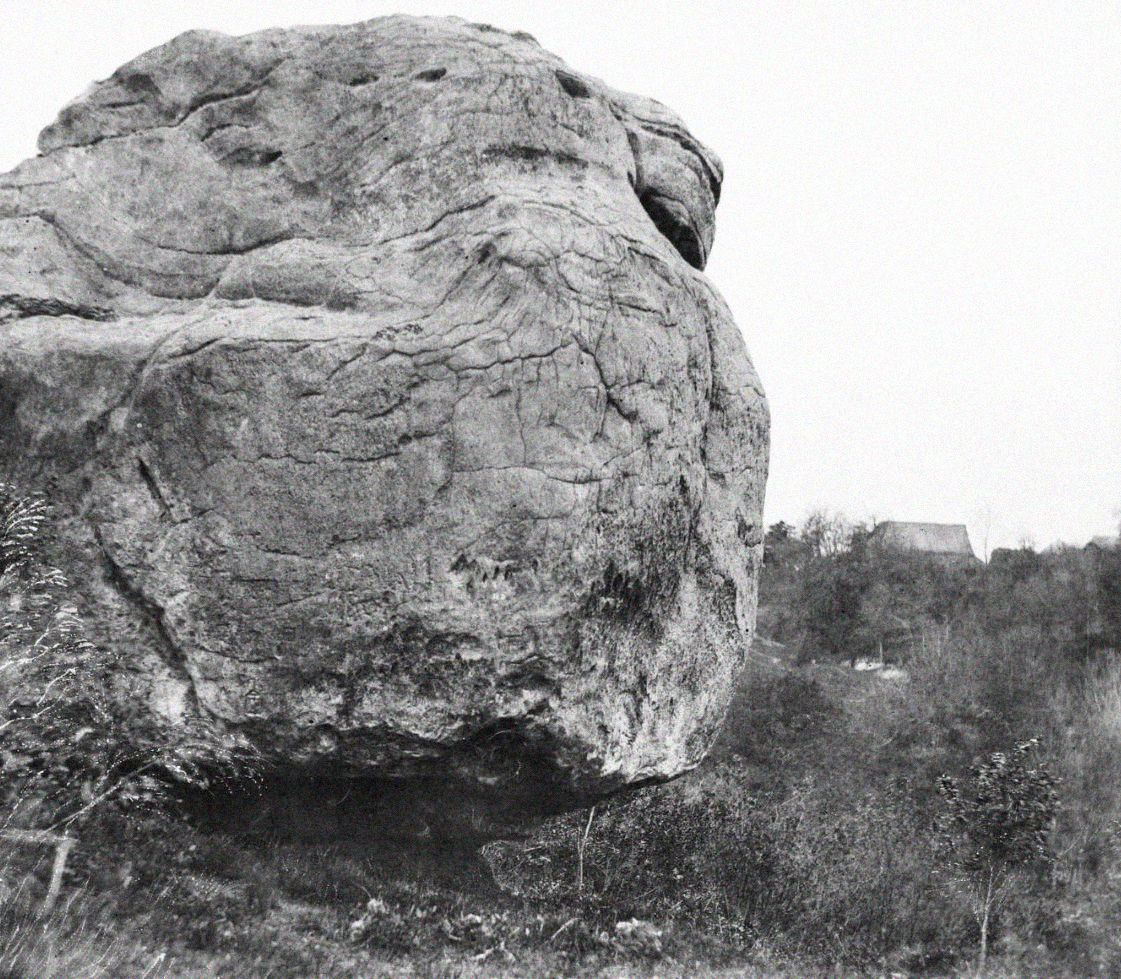
A detail from Henry Taylor's photograph of 1858, looking east, showing a much clearer environment, with Philpots Manor visible in the distance

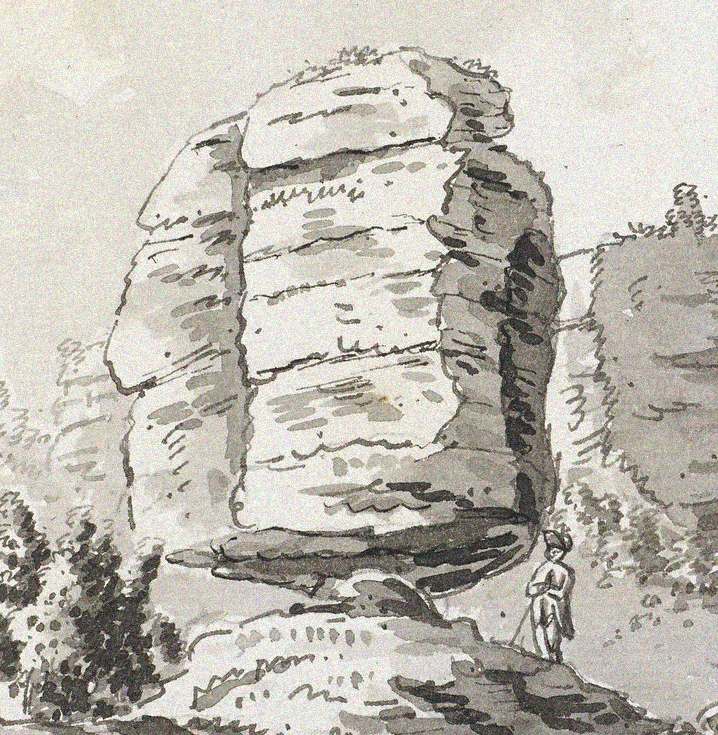
Francis Grose's 18th-century sketch (detail) of Great Upon Little

Great Upon Little (also Great On Little or Big On Little) is a precariously-supported rock, part of the sandstone escarpment within Chiddingly Wood in West Sussex, England. It became a famous historical attraction because of its hundreds of tonnes of rock balanced on an undercut base. It forms part of a Site of Special Scientific Interest (SSSI).

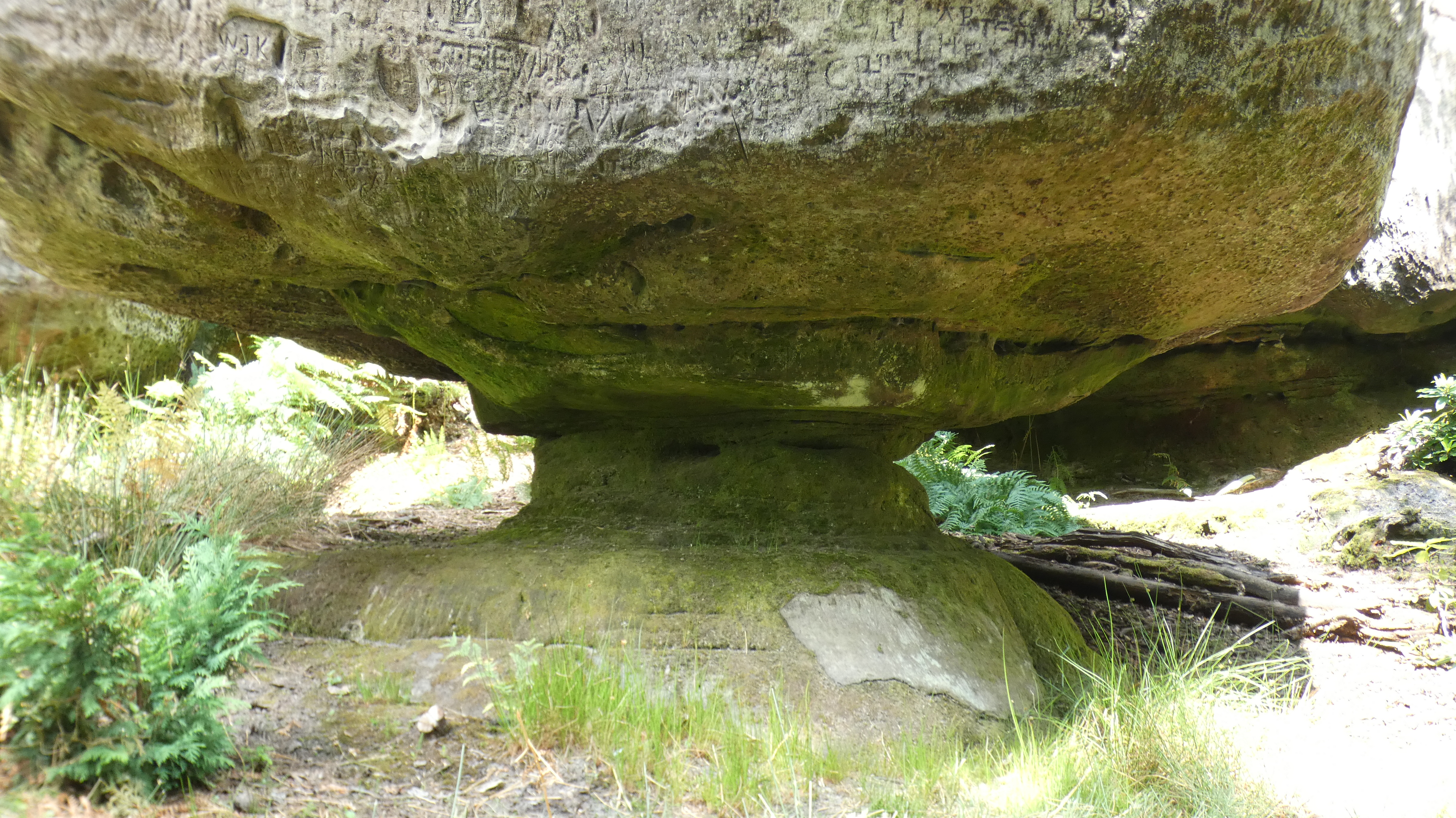
The undercut base supporting Great Upon Little. The centuries-old graffiti is clear.

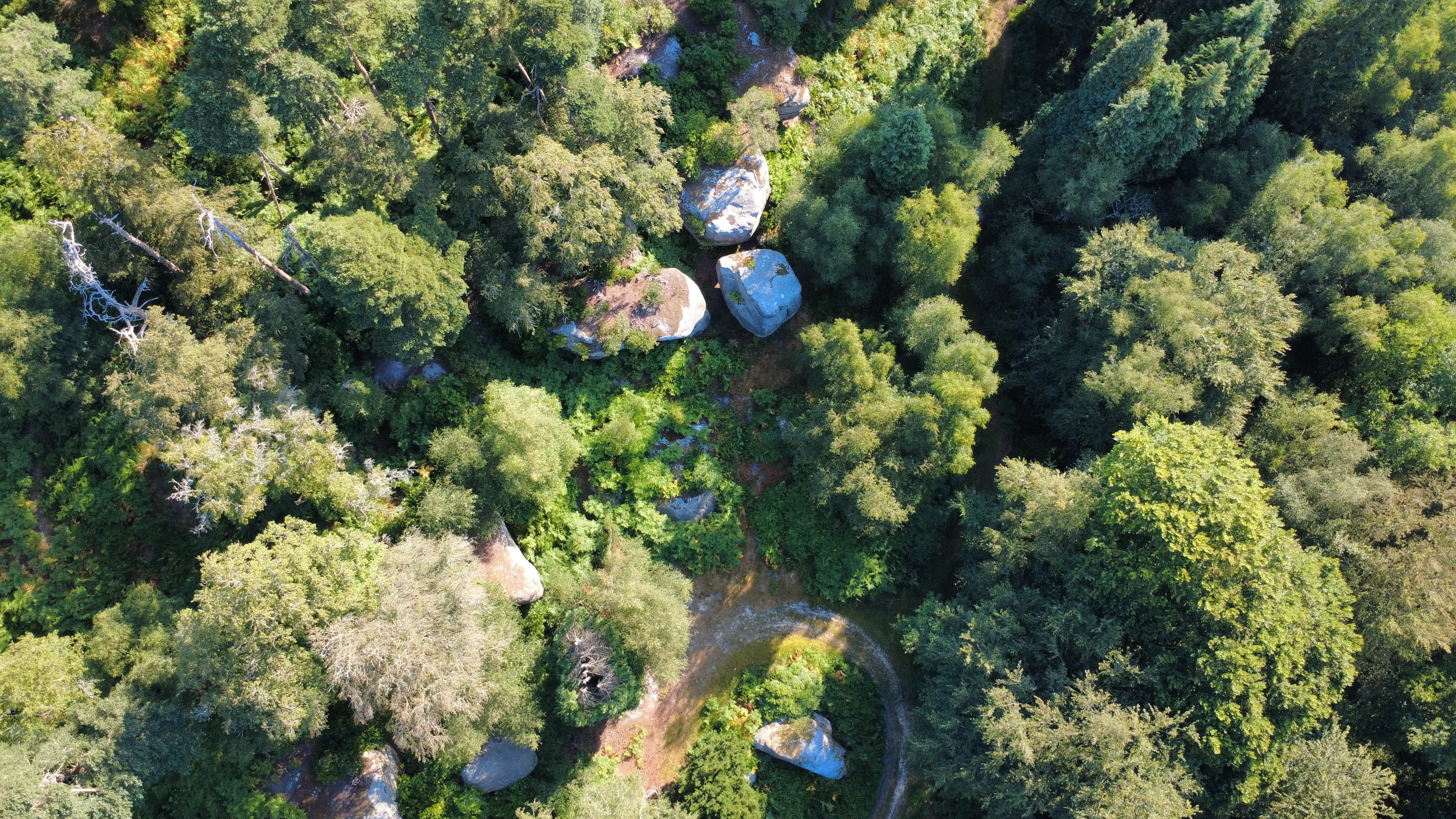
Aerial view of Great Upon Little amongst other rocks of the escarpment in Chiddingly Wood

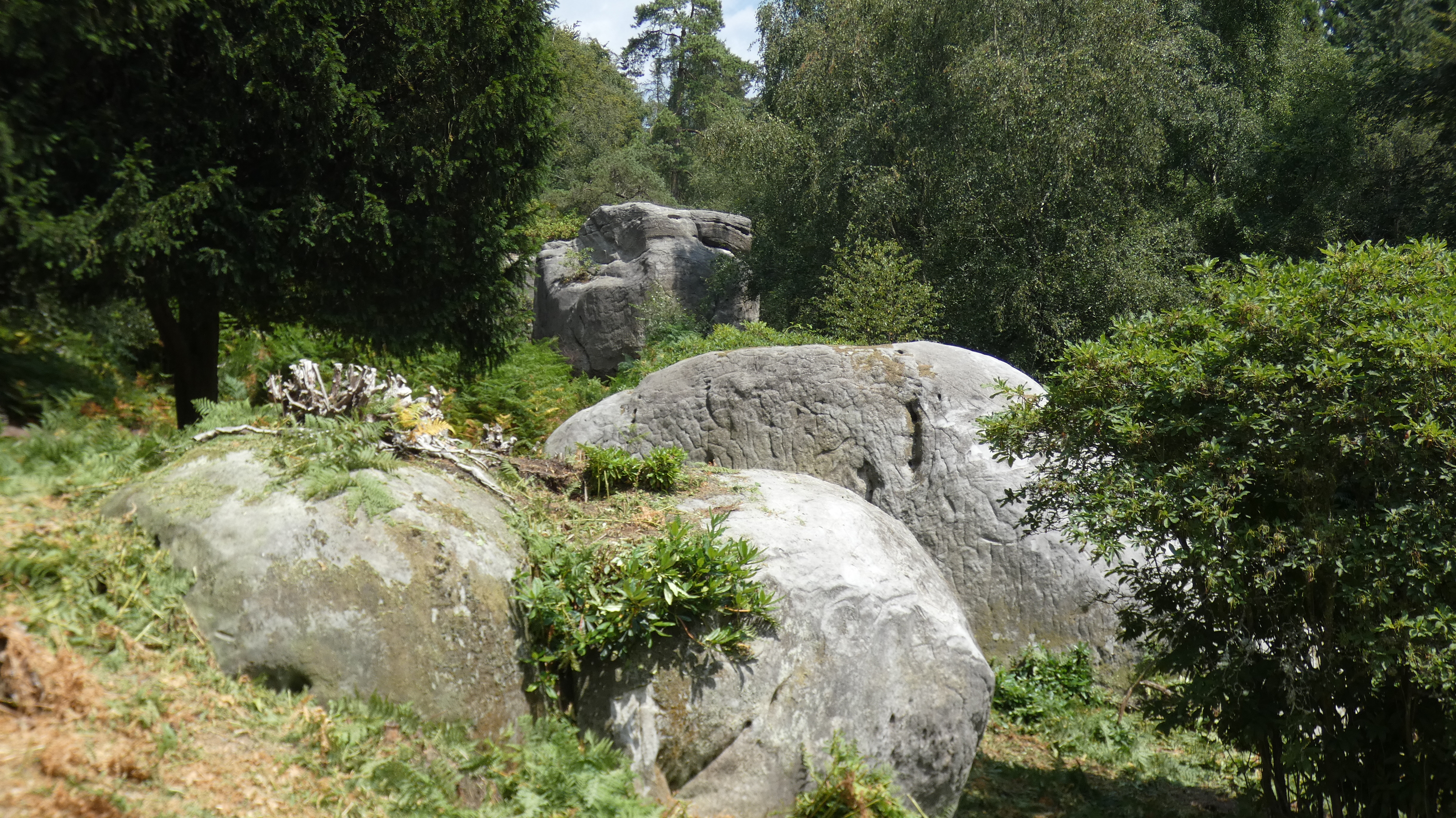
Looking east-northeast, showing invasive species, also growing on the rock itself

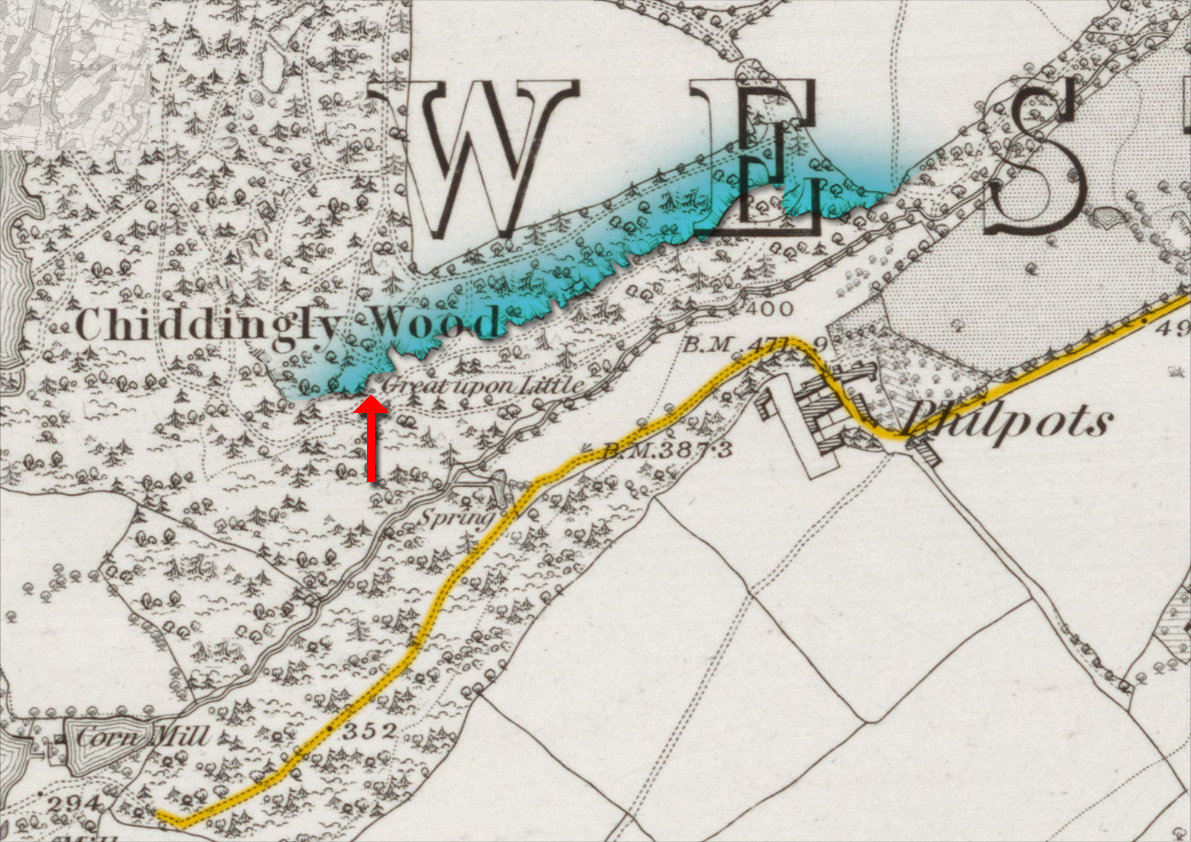
A detail from the Ordnance Survey Sussex Sheet XV (1879) indicating Great Upon Little (arrow) by the escarpment (blue) immediately north of the public bridleway (yellow)

== History ==
The area around Great Upon Little is associated with mesolithic peoples and the history of the Celtic Britons. Philpots Camp or Promontory Fort is immediately above the escarpment, and the rock itself is part of that scheduled monument. Flints have been discovered all around the rock.

A number of illustrations were made of the rock from the 18th century, in the dramatic style of the time. George III owned a copy of Francis Grose's pen-and-ink sketch titled "A National Rock call'd Great upon Little near Wakehurst Sussex," now in the British Library, drawn between 1760 and 1790. Job Bulman did a drawing of the rock in 1767. The Swiss landscape artist Samuel Hieronymous Grimm painted watercolour sketches of Great Upon Little in 1780. The chemist and photographer Henry Taylor made an image in 1858 which shows the centuries-old carved graffiti, still recognisable amongst more recent additions.

The woods have been described as the fabled residence of a dragon whose excesses interrupted an anchorite who dispatched the beast and laid its head - Great Upon Little - on a pillow of stone. The rock has been called "traditionally a Celtic sacrificial deity" with others reporting that its appearance induced visitors to try to overbalance it. The Kent and Sussex Courier of 1937 dismissed attempts by some to prove the rock was used by "primitive men in the rites of their pagan religion." Great Upon Little is indicated on Ordnance Survey maps surveyed from 1874.

== Landscape and geology ==
The area around the rock today appears different to the historical view, with larger trees, including conifers, denser growth, thick high ferns and little grass. Taylor's 1858 photograph (see image) shows it had been visible for 200 metres.The site was notified for its geological and biological importance in 1954 and is a Nature Conservation Review site. Natural England reported pressures of invasive species — particularly rhododendron — on surrounding native flora, with the invasive plants and brambles still to be cleared; rhododendron is growing on the rock itself.

The escarpment of which Great Upon Little is a part runs west-southwest to east-northeast on the southern-facing slope of a spur of the Tunbridge Wells Sand Formation (TWS), between West Hoathly and Wakehurst Place. Great Upon Little lies towards the western end of the crag, which is formed of Ardingly Sandstone — a sub-unit of TWS — thickly-bedded massive stones made of greyish-white soft quartzose sandstone, also known as 'sandrock' which, along with those at Wakehurst Place, make up the richest site of such rock in the UK. The rock is between 133.9 and 139.4 million years old. The rocks and their weathering features are important geomorphologically, and the associated microclimate, flora and fauna led to Wakehurst and Chiddingly Woods being listed together as an SSSI, inclusion in A Nature Conservation Review, and Chiddingly Wood in the Geological Conservation Review. The Ardingly stone overlies the Lower Tunbridge Wells Sand formation, which is more easily eroded. Great Upon Little has an elevation of 125 metres and stands on the boundary between these two types of sandstone; the bulk of it is Ardingly stone and the very-eroded, undercut narrow base of it, approximately 1 metre by 2 metres, is formed of the less durable sandstone.

== Access ==
The rock is on private land. From the junction of North Lane and Hook Lane in West Hoathly, a frequently-used public byway and bridleway, part of the High Weald Landscape Trail, runs southwest along the unsurfaced Philpots Lane (Philpots Cottages), turning right through the site of Philpots Manor School into Chiddingly Wood, at which point, turning left, the bridleway continues southwest, passing just south of the rock, eventually coming round to rejoin Hook Lane opposite Ludwell House. Turning right at the woods instead of left follows a footpath which leads round to the top of the escarpment. There were formerly 30 climbing routes developed from the 1950s on the outcrop but climbing was banned by the owner, with the support of Natural England, because of its status as an SSSI.

== See also ==
- Wakehurst and Chiddingly Woods
