= South of England Show =

Annual county show held in Ardingly, Sussex

Coordinates: 51°3′16″N 0°5′19″W

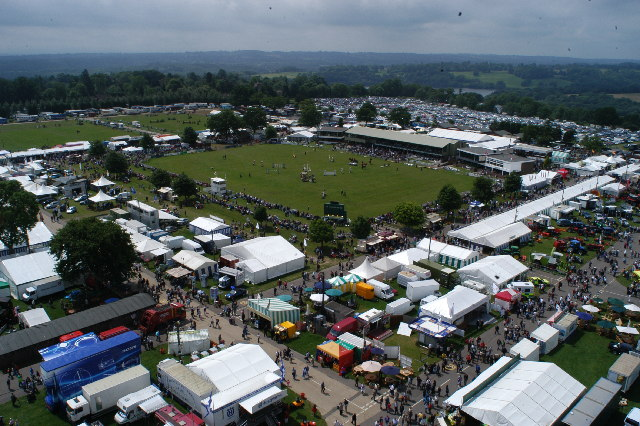
- Aerial view over the showground in 2003
- Genre: County show
- Dates: First Thursday in June for three days
- Locations: Ardingly, Sussex
- Years active: 1967–present
- Attendance: 84,000 (2009)
- Website: The South of England Show

The South of England Show is a county show held annually at its own showground in Ardingly, Sussex, during June. The show was founded in 1967 and is organised by the South of England Agricultural Society. The show attracts up to about 80,000 visitors every year.

== History ==
The South of England Show is held annually at its own showground in Ardingly, Sussex during June. The show was founded in 1967 after the merging of the Tunbridge Wells and South-Eastern Counties, the Sussex County and the Royal Counties Agricultural Societies into the South of England Agricultural Society. The Society organises the South of England Show, which has been patronised by Queen Elizabeth II and Sophie, Duchess of Edinburgh, respectively. The show covers the areas of Berkshire, East Sussex, Hampshire, the Isle of Wight, Kent, Surrey and West Sussex. The show, which celebrated its fiftieth anniversary in 2017, attracts up to about 80,000 visitors every year.

== Features ==
The show still contains its central agricultural theme, with livestock including dairy and beef cattle, sheep and pigs, with thousands of animals on display. The show has grown from its agricultural roots to include a large equestrian contingent, including showjumping, showing and heavy horse displays.

The show also includes a large number of trade stands as well as a food hall, flower marquee and crafts. The main arena at the showground hosts a variety of displays from all the disciplines on show, including equestrian, livestock and musical, as well as special display items such as motorcycle displays and a parade of foxhounds from the local fox hunts.
