= All Saints Church, Highbrook =

All Saints Church
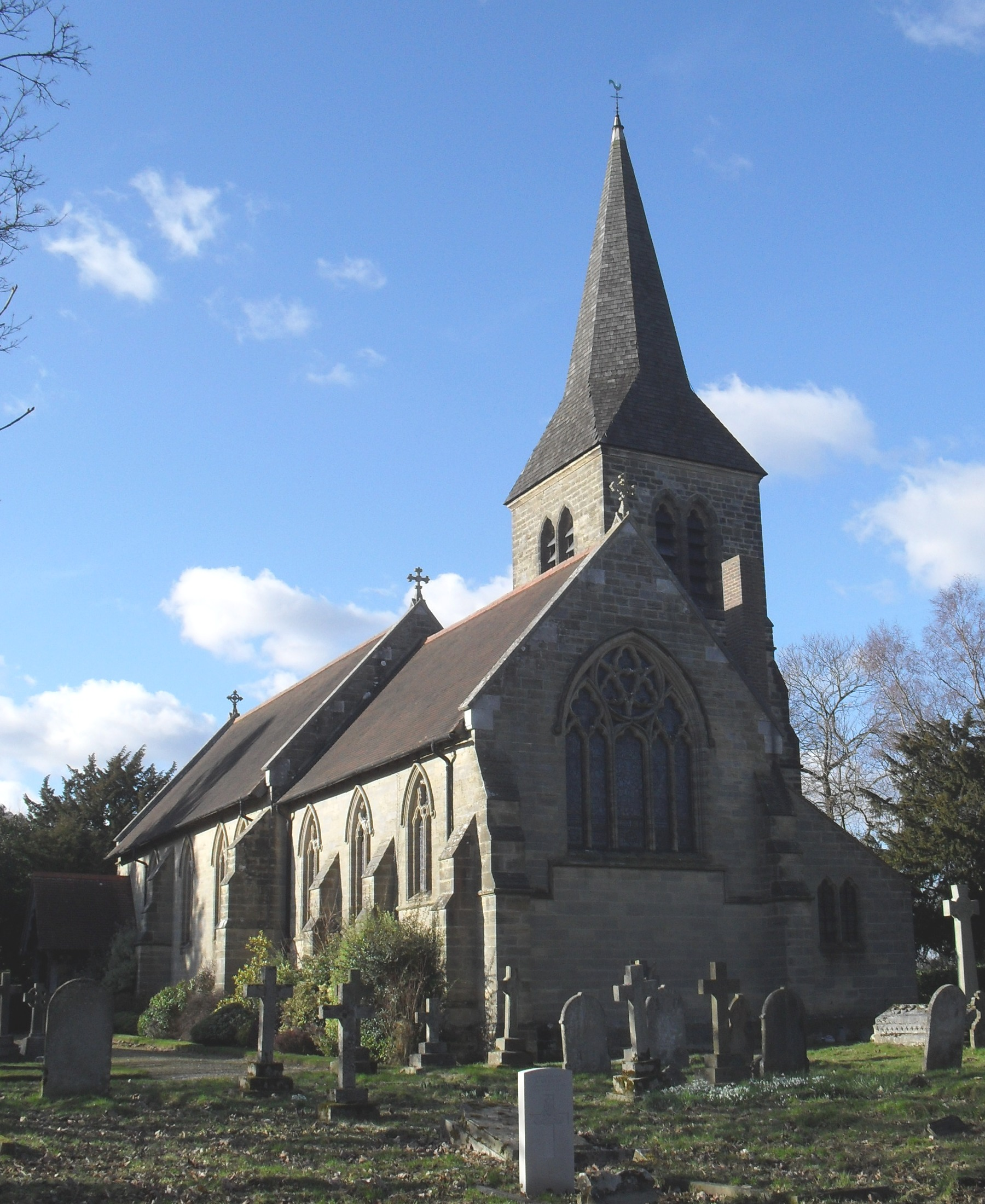
- The church from the southeast
- All Saints Church
- 51.0549°N 0.0574°W
- Location: Hammingden Lane, Highbrook, West Hoathly, West Sussex RH17 6SS
- Country: England
- Denomination: Church of England https://www.allsaints-highbrook.org.uk

History
- Status: Parish church
- Founded: 1882
- Founder(s): Francis Kirby and Caroline Weguelin
- Dedication: All Saints

Architecture
- Functional status: Active
- Heritage designation: Grade II
- Designated: 11 May 1983
- Architect(s): Richard H. Carpenter and Benjamin Ingelow
- Style: Gothic Revival
- Groundbreaking: 1882
- Completed: 1884
- Construction cost: £4,000

Administration
- Province: Canterbury
- Diocese: Chichester
- Archdeaconry: Horsham
- Deanery: Rural Deanery of Cuckfield
- Parish: Highbrook: All Saints

All Saints Church is an Anglican church in the hamlet of Highbrook in Mid Sussex, one of seven local government districts in the English county of West Sussex. The tiny settlement, in the parish of West Hoathly, was distant from the parish church in that village; two wealthy sisters accordingly funded the construction of a new church to serve the local population. Richard H. Carpenter and Benjamin Ingelow's stone building, with a prominent spire, opened in 1884 and was allocated its own parish. The "handsome" church, designed in the 14th/15th-century style of the Gothic Revival, has been listed at Grade II by English Heritage for its architectural and historical importance.

== History ==
The ancient parish of West Hoathly covered a large area of the High Weald in central Sussex, characterised by clay soil with sandstone ridges. The hamlet of Highbrook developed on an isolated area of lower ground (still 400 feet (120 m) above sea level) in the south of the parish, about 1.5 miles (2.4 km) south of West Hoathly village. The road connecting them, Hammingden Lane, runs along one of the narrow sandstone outcrops.

By the Victorian era, Highbrook had many long-established houses and farms—some of which dated from the 16th and 17th centuries— but it had not expanded much beyond this old core: its population was recorded as 186. Nevertheless, in 1882, two wealthy local sisters, Frances Kirby and Caroline Weguelin, decided to pay for a church to be built in the hamlet. They felt that the inhabitants were put off from travelling the long distance to St Margaret's Church at West Hoathly (the parish church): its situation at the north end of West Hoathly village meant the walk was about 2 miles (3.2 km). At that time, Sussex was in the middle of an unprecedented period of church-building, prompted originally by the Church of England's disquiet over the low level of church attendance revealed for the first time by questions in the United Kingdom Census 1851. Between 1860 and 1890, 269 churches of all Christian denominations (mostly Anglican) were built in Sussex, and the early 1880s was the peak period for new establishments. Although many were funded by the Church of England (through the Diocese of Chichester, the administrative and pastoral district covering Sussex), the late 19th century was also the principal era in which wealthy benefactors founded new churches, especially in rural areas or on country estates, and often as a memorial to a deceased relative or friend. Many examples survive in Sussex, including Highbrook's new and expensively endowed All Saints Church: the sisters paid £4,000 (£416,000 as of 2025) towards its construction.

Architects Richard H. Carpenter and Benjamin Ingelow were commissioned to design the church. Carpenter worked extensively in Sussex—his buildings included the chapel at Lancing College—and the pair had formed a partnership in 1872. They had first worked together in 1862 on St Andrew's Cathedral in Honolulu. Their Gothic Revival design for All Saints—the most popular style for Sussex churches in the Victorian era— used locally quarried stone and was completed in 1884. The church was large, especially in relation to the sparse local population; it was also parished from the beginning: in 1882 part of the former West Hoathly parish was allocated to it.

No internal fittings were paid for out of the original endowment. A set of stained glass windows were installed by the firm of Clayton and Bell between 1885 and 1892, including the main east window which was a memorial to the founding sisters' parents. In 1933, the chancel floor was relaid with a checkerboard pattern of black and white marble by Walter Tower, nephew and working partner of stained glass designer Charles Eamer Kempe.

== Architecture ==
All Saints Church, characterised by architectural historian Nikolaus Pevsner as "a serious job, outside and inside", is a Gothic Revival-style building, variously described as in the Decorated style of around 1300, "Early Geometrical" (i.e. a 19th-century interpretation of the transition between Early English and Decorated Gothic) and "15th-century Gothic". It has a chancel and nave with a chancel arch between them, an aisle on the north side of the nave, a porch on the south side and a northeast tower topped with a broach spire laid with oak shingles. The whole church is built of local stone.

All windows are lancets with tracery of the Decorated Gothic style, and all have stained glass. The east window of the chancel is the largest, with five lights. The chancel arch and aisles have moulded capitals and responds which appear more elaborate than in a typical rural church of the era. Other internal fixtures include a reredos of marble and memorials to the founding sisters.

== The church today ==
All Saints Church was listed at Grade II by English Heritage on 11 May 1983; this defines it as a "nationally important" building of "special interest". As of February 2001, it was one of 958 Grade II listed buildings, and 1,028 listed buildings of all grades, in the district of Mid Sussex.

The parish covers the hamlet of Highbrook and the surrounding rural area between the B2028 Edenbridge–Haywards Heath road and the preserved Bluebell Railway line. It is part of the united benefice of Highbrook and West Hoathly, which was created in September 1975. The advowson is held by the Bishop of Chichester.

== See also ==
- List of places of worship in Mid Sussex
- St Margaret's Church, West Hoathly

== Bibliography ==
- Elleray, D. Robert (1981). The Victorian Churches of Sussex. Chichester: Phillimore & Co. Ltd. ISBN 0-85033-378-4.
- Elleray, D. Robert (2004). Sussex Places of Worship. Worthing: Optimus Books. ISBN 0-9533132-7-1.
- Nairn, Ian; Pevsner, Nikolaus (1965). The Buildings of England: Sussex. Harmondsworth: Penguin Books. ISBN 0-14-071028-0.
