= St Peter's Church, Ardingly =

St Peter's Church
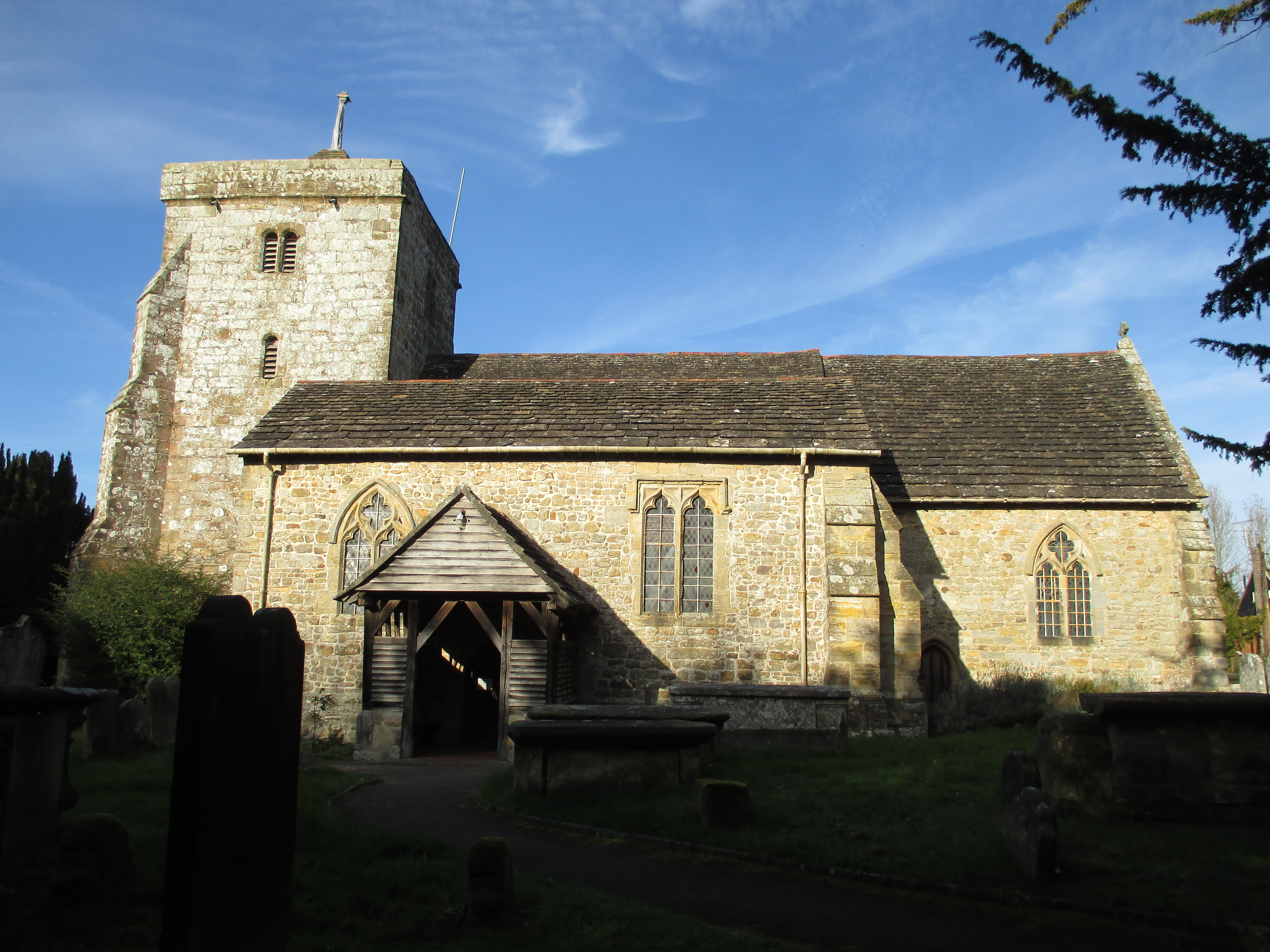
- The church viewed from the south
- St Peter's Church
- 51.0521°N 0.0899°W
- Location: Street Lane, Ardingly, West Sussex RH17 6UN
- Country: England
- Denomination: Church of England
- Churchmanship: Open Evangelical
- Website: www.ardinglychurch.org.uk

History
- Status: Parish church
- Founded: 11th century
- Founder: Possibly William de Warenne
- Dedication: Saint Peter

Architecture
- Functional status: Active
- Heritage designation: Grade I listed
- Designated: 28 October 1957
- Style: Decorated Gothic

Administration
- Province: Canterbury
- Diocese: Chichester
- Archdeaconry: Horsham
- Deanery: Rural Deanery of Cuckfield
- Parish: Ardingly, St Peter

Clergy
- Rector: Reverend John Crutchley

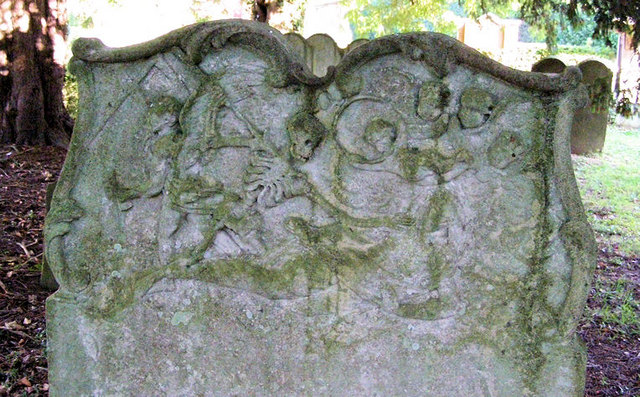
This unusual tombstone depicts a skeleton stabbing a woman with a lance

St Peter's Church is the Church of England parish church of the parish of Ardingly in Mid Sussex, one of seven local government districts in the English county of West Sussex. The present building dates from the 14th century and was restored during the Victorian era, but Christian worship on the site has a much longer history. The stone-built, Decorated Gothic-style church, west of the village centre, has been designated a Grade I Listed building.

== History ==
Ardingly developed as a settlement during the Saxon era, when a forest clearing (leah in Old English) was created on a piece of high ground near a tributary of the River Ouse, which runs across this part of the Weald. The area cleared for settlement included a hill 398 feet (121 m) high, and the Normans founded a church on this site in the 11th century. (It is possible, although not confirmed, that this replaced an earlier church on the same site, which would have been founded by Saxon or pre-Saxon pig-farmers or ironworkers who travelled through the area. More than 150 such churches, usually of wood with thatched roofs, were built between the 7th century, when Sussex was converted to Christianity, and the Norman era.) William de Warenne, 1st Earl of Surrey has been identified as the likely founder of the 11th-century church. His son, William de Warenne, 2nd Earl of Surrey, granted the advowson of the church to Lewes Priory in about 1100.

Little is known about the history of the Norman church. By the middle of the 14th century, the village had developed a successful wool trade, and the new wealth available led to the construction of a new church on the same site. This had a nave with one aisle on the south side and a chancel. It was built between about 1330 and 1350, in the popular Decorated Gothic style, and almost all traces of its 11th-century predecessor were removed. The lower section of the tower also dates from the mid-14th century, as does a tomb in the chancel which bears the (now damaged) effigy of a priest. The priest has a lion couchant at his feet, representing the triumph of good over evil.

The substantial stone tower was built early in the 15th century. Unusually for the area, it lacks a spire; this may be because it was used as a defensive structure against possible French invaders, or because its top was used as a fire-beacon to warn locals of invasion. It is 50 feet (15 m) tall, square (12 by 12 feet (3.7 m × 3.7 m)) and has walls 4 feet (1.2 m) thick. Inside the tower, and contemporary with it, an oak staircase carved from large blocks of wood rises from the north wall.

The English Reformation of the 1530s led to Henry VIII assuming control of all property held by England's monasteries and priories. The advowson of St Peter's Church, and all others held by Lewes Priory, was transferred to the King in 1535. He in turn granted the patronage to his chief minister, Thomas Cromwell, who held it until he was beheaded in 1540. It finally passed out of the Crown's possession in 1550, and passed through a series of private patrons (many of whom were associated with the nearby Manor of Wakehurst) until the Church Pastoral Aid Society assumed the patronage in 1925.

By 1724, when the Bishop of Chichester Thomas Bowers commissioned a survey of all churches in his diocese, St Peter's Church was in poor structural condition, but repairs were carried out soon afterwards. A new bell, cast in 1719 in nearby Horsham, was installed in the tower at the same time. Another, cast in London and paid for by the congregation, was added in 1766. Around this time, the Lydell family—owners of the Wakehurst Place estate and patrons of the church—built a burial vault in the church and turned the south aisle into their private chapel.

Restoration and refitting of medieval churches was commonplace in the Victorian era, and two rounds of changes were made to the structure and internal fittings: first in 1853, with some advice from Sir George Gilbert Scott, and again in 1887. The ancient rood screen was moved into the tower in 1853, the pews were replaced, and the pulpit and the gallery were removed. These changes reduced the capacity of the church slightly, to just over 200. The rood screen was later moved again to cover the arch inside the tower, and the rector bought the church its first proper organ, built by a Brighton-based firm for £133 (£13,000 in 2025). This was in turn replaced with a new organ, which cost £1,100 (£125,000 in 2025), in 1887, during the main period of restoration ; the church was closed for about a year while Benjamin Ingelow and Richard Herbert Carpenter added a vestry, north aisle with 50 seats, pulpit and lectern, and carried out structural repairs. The capacity of the church rose to about 280 as a result of the improvements.

Ingelow and Carpenter's work uncovered a stone capital which dated from the 12th century. It was retained and put on display in the north aisle, and is the only fragment that definitely survives from the Norman church—although some stone blocks incorporated into the wall of the south aisle may also have come from it.

Additions in the 20th century started with the liturgical East window, a memorial to a local man who was prominent in the Wealden iron industry. This dates from 1900 and may have been designed by Charles Eamer Kempe. Other stained glass was provided by the local firm Clayton & Bell. A new lychgate, reredos and altar were installed in 1913; all were donated to the church as memorials. Another new organ replaced its predecessor in 1939; this was in turn removed in 1972 in favour of a better model, which cost about £6,000 (£71,000 in 2025).

A large churchyard surrounds the church, but when this became full it was extended on to land on the opposite side of Church Lane, which was donated by the owner of Wakehurst Place. This extension, made in 1944, prevented the ancient gravestones in the original churchyard being removed to make way for new burials. As a result, many old and unusual gravestones survive, including one which depicts a woman being stabbed with a lance by a skeleton, as angels watch.

== Architecture ==
The church was built of stone in the Decorated Gothic style. The main body of the church consists of, from liturgical West to East, a square tower, nave, chancel and altar. A north aisle runs the length of the nave, and a vestry adjoins the chancel and the north aisle. On the opposite side of the nave is the south aisle and a 15th-century wooden entrance porch. The roof is tiled with locally quarried Horsham stone.

The chancel has hood-moulded trefoiled windows in its liturgical North and South walls. Also in the south wall is an ornate priest's door with a pointed-arched head. A hood-moulded piscina and aumbry, both dating from when the church was built, are also visible on the chancel walls. An archway separates the chancel from the vestry, but there is no arch leading into the nave. The roof has king posts inside. The outside walls are buttressed. Medieval stained glass is still visible in some of the chancel windows.

The nave has two unequal bays. Its roof, built higher than that of the chancel and dating from the 15th century, has tie beams and king posts. The aisles incorporate reworkings of some 14th-century work (in particular, capitals and responds on the pillars) and may even include some older material.

The porch, dating from about 1500, forms the entrance to the church. It is timber-framed, but most of this is hidden under weatherboarding. The gabled roof, tiled with Horsham stone slabs in common with the rest of the church roof, has king posts inside. Next to the porch, on the wall of the south aisle, a 16th-century scratch dial, a primitive sundial, is still visible.

== The church today ==
St Peter's Church was designated a Grade I Listed building on 28 October 1957.

The church holds two services every Sunday: a Holy Communion service, using the 1662 Book of Common Prayer, and a Morning Worship service. A youth group and Sunday school are also run.

The parish, 3,811 acres (1,542 ha) in size and with the church at its centre, covers a mostly rural area: Ardingly is the only significant centre of population. The B2028 Edenbridge–Haywards Heath road runs through the parish from north to south.

== See also ==
- List of places of worship in Mid Sussex
