= West Hoathly =

Village and parish in West Sussex, England

Coordinates: 51.07999°N 0.05293°W

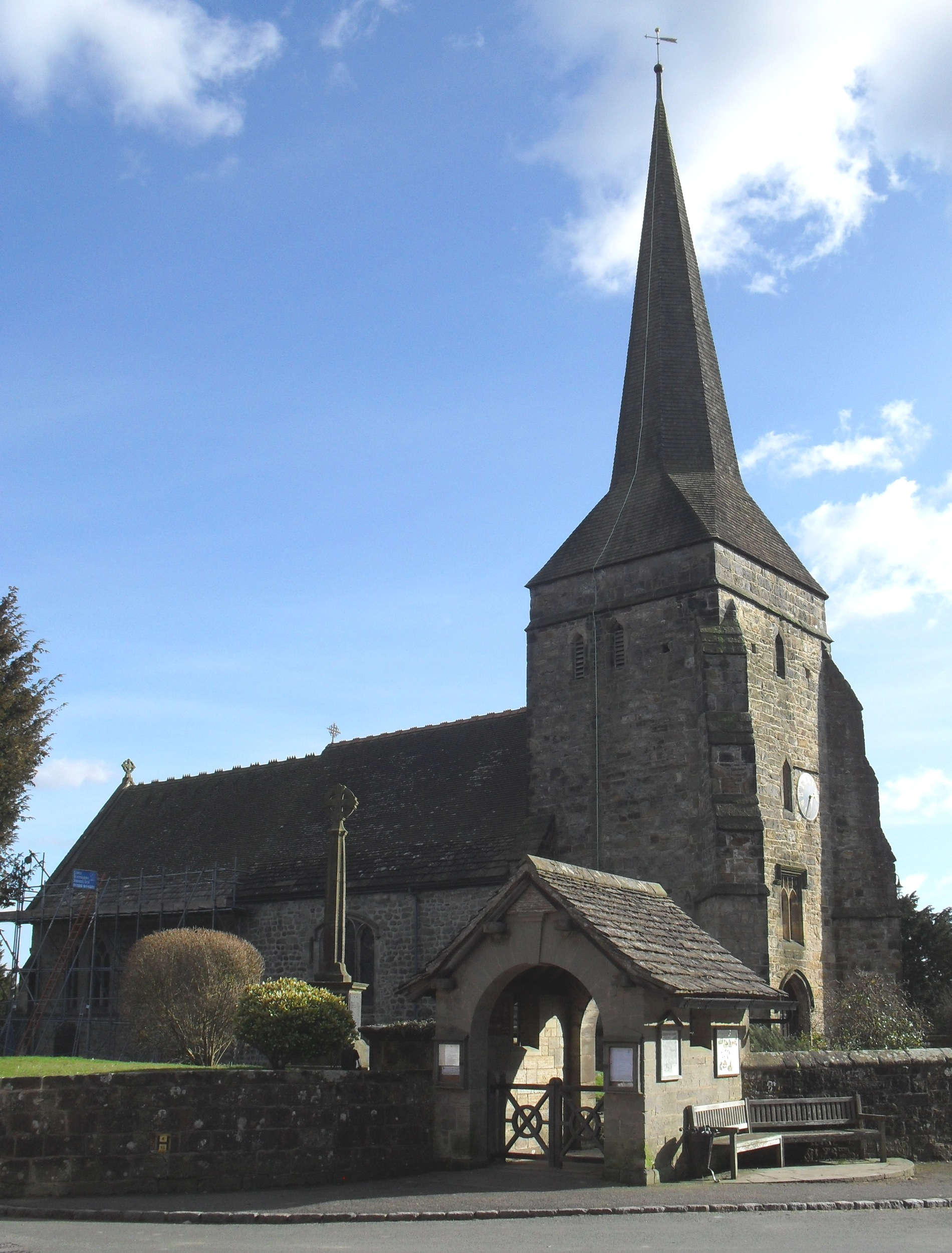
- St Margaret of Antioch Church

- Location within West Sussex
- Area: 21.39 km^{2} (8.26 sq mi)
- Population: 2,121 2001 Census; 2,181 (2011 Census)
  - Density: 99/km^{2} (260/sq mi)
- OS grid reference: TQ364329
  - London: 29 miles (47 km) N
- Civil parish: West Hoathly
- District: Mid Sussex
- Shire county: West Sussex
- Region: South East
- Country: England
- Sovereign state: United Kingdom
- Post town: EAST GRINSTEAD
- Postcode district: RH19
- Dialling code: 01342
- Police: Sussex
- Fire: West Sussex
- Ambulance: South East Coast
- UK Parliament: East Grinstead and Uckfield
- Website: Parish Council

West Hoathly is a village and civil parish in the Mid Sussex District of West Sussex, England, located 3.5 miles (5.6 km) south west of East Grinstead. In the 2001 census 2,121 people, of whom 1,150 were economically active, lived in 813 households. At the 2011 Census the population increased to 2,181. The parish, which has a land area of 2,139 hectares (5,290 acres), includes the hamlets of Highbrook, Selsfield Common and Sharpthorne. The mostly rural parish is centred on West Hoathly village, an ancient hilltop settlement in the High Weald between the North and South Downs.

== History ==
The area was already settled by the 11th century, when St Margaret's Church was founded. Names recorded at that time include Hadlega and Hodlega—later standardised to Hodlegh and Hothelegh, then (West) Hoathly. This Anglo-Saxon word signifies a heath-covered clearing. The parish lay on the edge of the dense woodland of the Ashdown Forest.

At the time of the Domesday survey in 1086, the land covered by the present parish was held by the manors of Ditchling and Plumpton to the southeast. The rectory of the church was associated with Lewes Priory. By the 16th century, the manor of Gravetye was in existence. Gravetye Manor house, built in 1598, still stands in extensive grounds 1 mile (1.6 km) north of the village.

In 1556, West Hoathly resident Ann Tree was burnt at the stake in East Grinstead for refusing to renounce Protestantism; she was one of 17 "Sussex Martyrs" who suffered this fate. A brass memorial in the church commemorates her.

In 1624, a cricket team from West Hoathly was involved in what is believed to be the earliest known organised match in Sussex, which took place at Horsted Keynes.

=== Railway connection ===
West Hoathly was connected to the British railway network when the Lewes and East Grinstead Railway was built in 1882. A station was provided east of the village, between the village itself and Sharpthorne.

The line passed under a sandstone ridge by means of a 731yd long tunnel. The line and station closed on 16 March 1958, and the station stood derelict for many years, with the footbridge and down-platform buildings removed in 1964 and the station house demolished in 1967. The preserved Bluebell Railway, (now 11 miles in length) runs along part of the route of the former Lewes and East Grinstead Railway. The West Hoathly station site was purchased by the Bluebell Railway on 30 November 1975, and the line re-opened through the site in 1992, but the station itself otherwise remains disused.

== "Big-upon-Little" ==
Also known as "Great-upon-Little", this natural landscape formation is in a wooded area southwest of the village, near the road to Ardingly. It is an exposed outcrop of sandstone with a harder band overlying a soft stratum at ground level. The lower stratum has weathered significantly, making the upper section overhang like the cap of a mushroom.

== Places of worship ==
There are two Anglican churches in the civil parish. St Margaret's Church, dedicated to Margaret of Antioch, stands on North Lane in West Hoathly. It has Norman origins, although much of the fabric of the building is 13th-century. The church has a tower with a Perpendicular Gothic broach spire, a single-aisled nave, a chancel and a side chapel. The terraced churchyard is a well-known viewpoint, with far-reaching views across the Weald. All Saints Church at Highbrook was paid for by two wealthy local sisters who thought that church attendance among the hamlet's residence was being hampered by the long distance they had to travel to St Margaret's Church. Architects Richard H. Carpenter and Benjamin Ingelow designed the large, stone-built church in 1884. The churches have separate ecclesiastical parishes but are part of a united benefice, served by the same vicar.

St Dunstan's Roman Catholic church is in West Hoathly. English Heritage describe the building as "a curiosity": it was a cottage with an attached butcher's shop until its conversion into a church in 1957. In Sharpthorne, the Countess of Huntingdon's Connexion—a small Nonconformist denomination with links to Methodism—has a place of worship, the Sharpthorne Community Church. It was founded by members of an older church in nearby Turners Hill. There was also a Countess of Huntingdon's Connexion chapel at the north end of West Hoathly from 1826 until the early 21st century. The timber-framed building survives, but is disused.

== Buildings ==
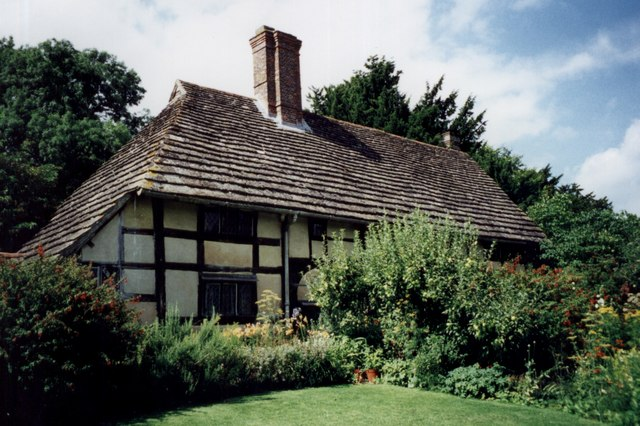
Priest House

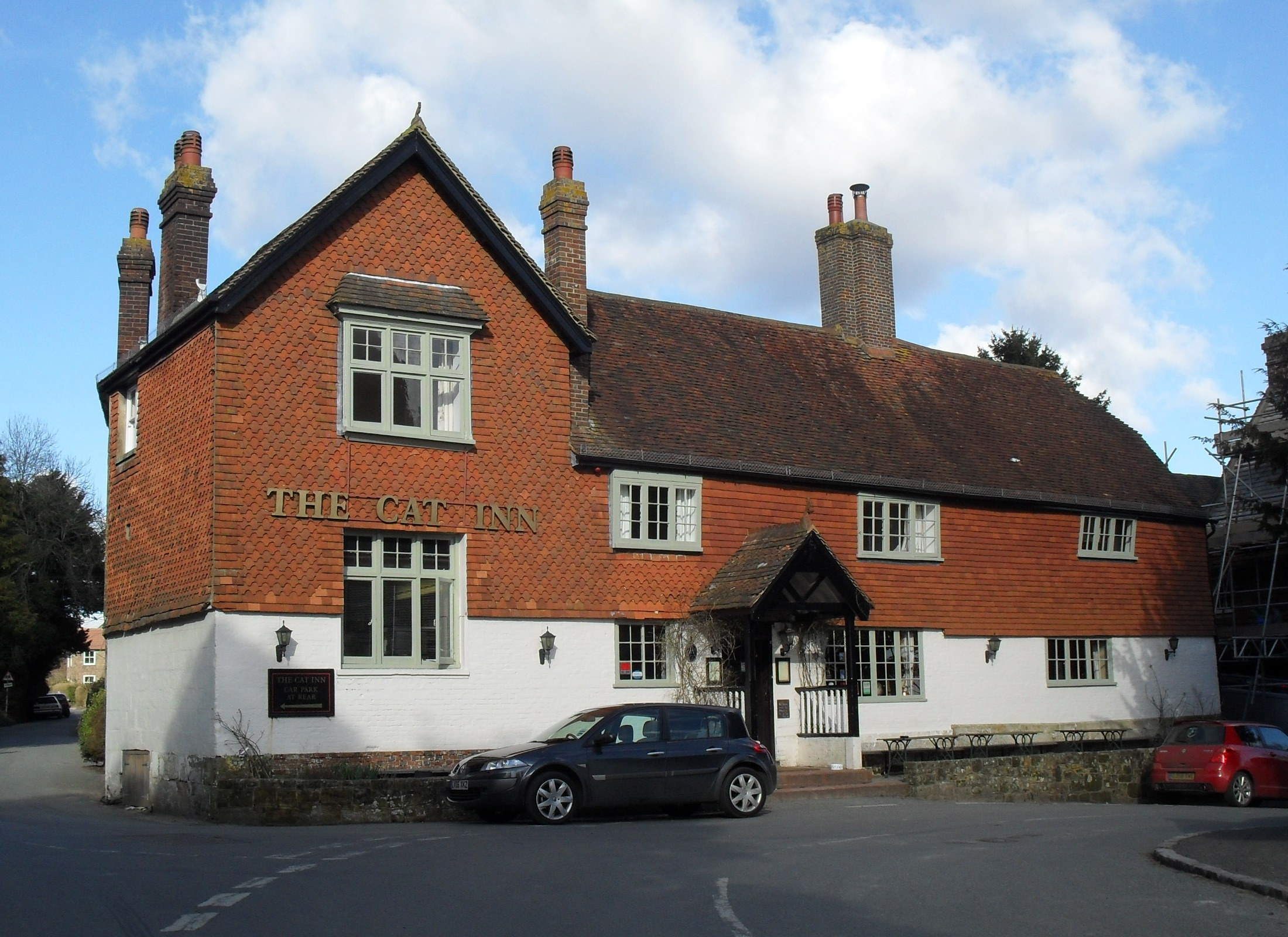
The Cat Inn

The parish has many medieval houses and farms. The oldest is Tickeridge, near Selsfield Common and the preserved Kingscote railway station. Its modernised exterior hides a 14th-century timber-framed Wealden hall house of "high antiquarian interest". The gabled solar wing dates from the 16th century. Gravetye Manor, built in 1598, has an Elizabethan façade and was built for a local ironmaster: northern Sussex was an important ironmaking area for several centuries. Later abandoned to smugglers, the building and its grounds were rejuvenated in 1884 when "the greatest English gardener" William Robinson bought it. He also designed the 30-acre (12 ha) gardens. Upon his death in 1935 the manor, set in a large area of woodland, passed to the Forestry Commission for use as a base for their work. It was converted into a high-class restaurant (now with a Michelin star) in 1958. Chiddinglye, which may have been a separate manor at one time, is a Gothic house of 1866. Next to it is Chiddinglye Farm, an open hall house with 15th- and 16th-century parts. Selsfield House has a Georgian façade.

The Priest House West Hoathly in the centre of the village opposite St Margaret's Church, was turned into a museum by the Sussex Archaeological Society in 1935. The 15th-century open hall-house, with a five-bay façade and a solar wing, retains some original windows and its king post and trussed roof. Items relating to local and domestic history are on display, and there are formal gardens. Also near the church is Manor House—not named in relation to any historic manor, but built in 1627 as a dower house and associated with the owners of Gravetye Manor. A note in the museum says that it was built for Katherine Infield, widow of Richard Infield of Gravetye Manor. The building materials, the composition and the ornaments of the main facade are identical to the ones of Gavetye Manor. It is approximately H-shaped, built of ashlar, and has prominent mullioned windows and a gabled roof laid with Horsham stone slabs. Old panelling remains in some rooms.

The village pub is the Cat Inn, housed in an early 16th-century timber-framed building with a tile and brick exterior. Original beams are still visible inside on both storeys.

West Hoathly Church of England School, which maintains links with St Margaret's Church, is the primary school in the parish. There is also an independent special day School, Philpots Manor which is situated around half a mile from the village.

== Sports ==
Jasper Vinall from West Hoathly was the first cricketer known to have been killed while playing the game. This happened on 28 August 1624 against Horsted Keynes, East Sussex.

West Hoathly Football Club were founded in 1902 and currently play their games at The Recreation Ground. The best days of the club's history came in the 1980s where the team won the county league in five consecutive seasons a feat yet to be reproduced since. The kit for both teams is Home – Black and White stripes, Black shorts, Black socks Away – White with Red bar down the centre of the shirt, Red shorts, Red Socks Third - Yellow and blue shirt, yellow shorts with yellow socks

The team plays its home game at West Hoathly's Recreation Ground, The Pavilion which the team uses as its home area and changing rooms was given to the team in 1925 and since then has undergone many refurbishments the last one being in the 1980s, and now the rooms are in a very bad state with the current set up not passing The FA standard regulations. In April 2012 the local parish council agreed to let the team redevelop the pavilion adding in two new rooms on either side creating wet and dry rooms and a spacious area with patio area to help house local clubs/sports and scout groups. Unfortunately due to holds ups within the final agreements within the council and local residents. The work was never undertaken and as of 2026 the clubhouse is still in the same poor condition and maintained by members of the Football Club with the club in danger of folding.

== Landmarks ==
Near the village of Sharpthorne there is a Site of Special Scientific Interest known as West Hoathly Pit. It is a working clay pit of geological interest with 9 metres (30 ft) of visible sedimentary layers.
