= Wakehurst and Chiddingly Woods =

Nature preserve in West Sussex, England

Coordinates: 51.073°N 0.094°W

- Site of Special Scientific Interest
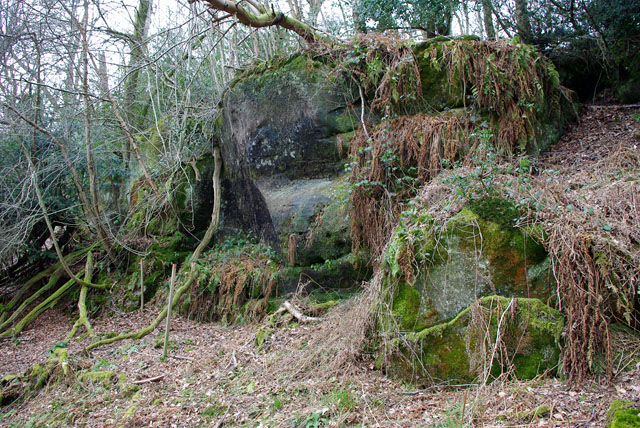
- Sandstone crag in Tilgate Wood
- Location of Wakehurst and Chiddingly Woods.
- Area of search: West Sussex
- Grid reference: TQ 336 321
- Interest: Biological; Geological
- Area: 155.9 hectares (385 acres)
- Notification date: 1987
- Location map: Magic Map

Wakehurst and Chiddingly Woods is a 155.9-hectare (385-acre) biological and geological Site of Special Scientific Interest south-east of Crawley in West Sussex, England. It is a Nature Conservation Review site, Grade I, and part of it is a Geological Conservation Review site.

These woods have steep sided valleys formed by streams cutting through Wadhurst Clay and Tunbridge Wells sands, exposing outcrops of sandstone. The valleys have a warm, moist micro-climate, with a rich variety of ferns, mosses, liverworts and lichens. There is a diverse breeding bird community. Chiddingly Wood is geologically important because weathering of its sandstone has produced sculptured blocks and a comprehensive set of micro-weathering features.
