= Isfield =

Village and parish in East Sussex, England

Coordinates: 50.93°N 0.06°E

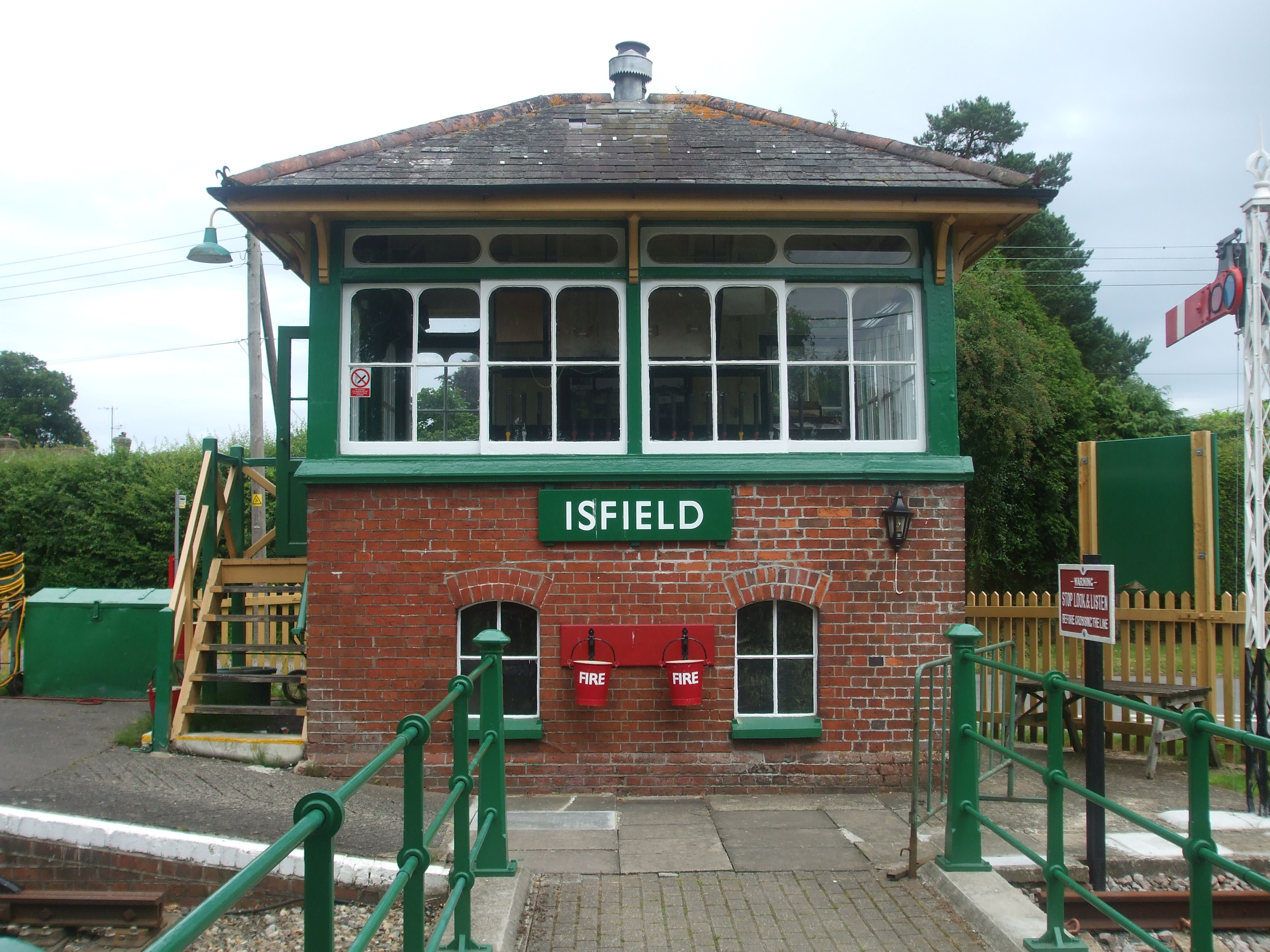
- Railway Station

- Location within East Sussex
- Area: 7.7 km^{2} (3.0 sq mi)
- Population: 574 (2011)
  - Density: 190/sq mi (73/km^{2})
- OS grid reference: TQ451170
  - London: 40 miles (64 km) NNW
- Civil parish: Isfield
- District: Wealden
- Shire county: East Sussex
- Region: South East
- Country: England
- Sovereign state: United Kingdom
- Post town: UCKFIELD
- Postcode district: TN22
- Dialling code: 01825
- Police: Sussex
- Fire: East Sussex
- Ambulance: South East Coast
- UK Parliament: Wealden

Isfield is a small village and civil parish in the Wealden District of East Sussex in England, located north-east of Lewes.

== History ==
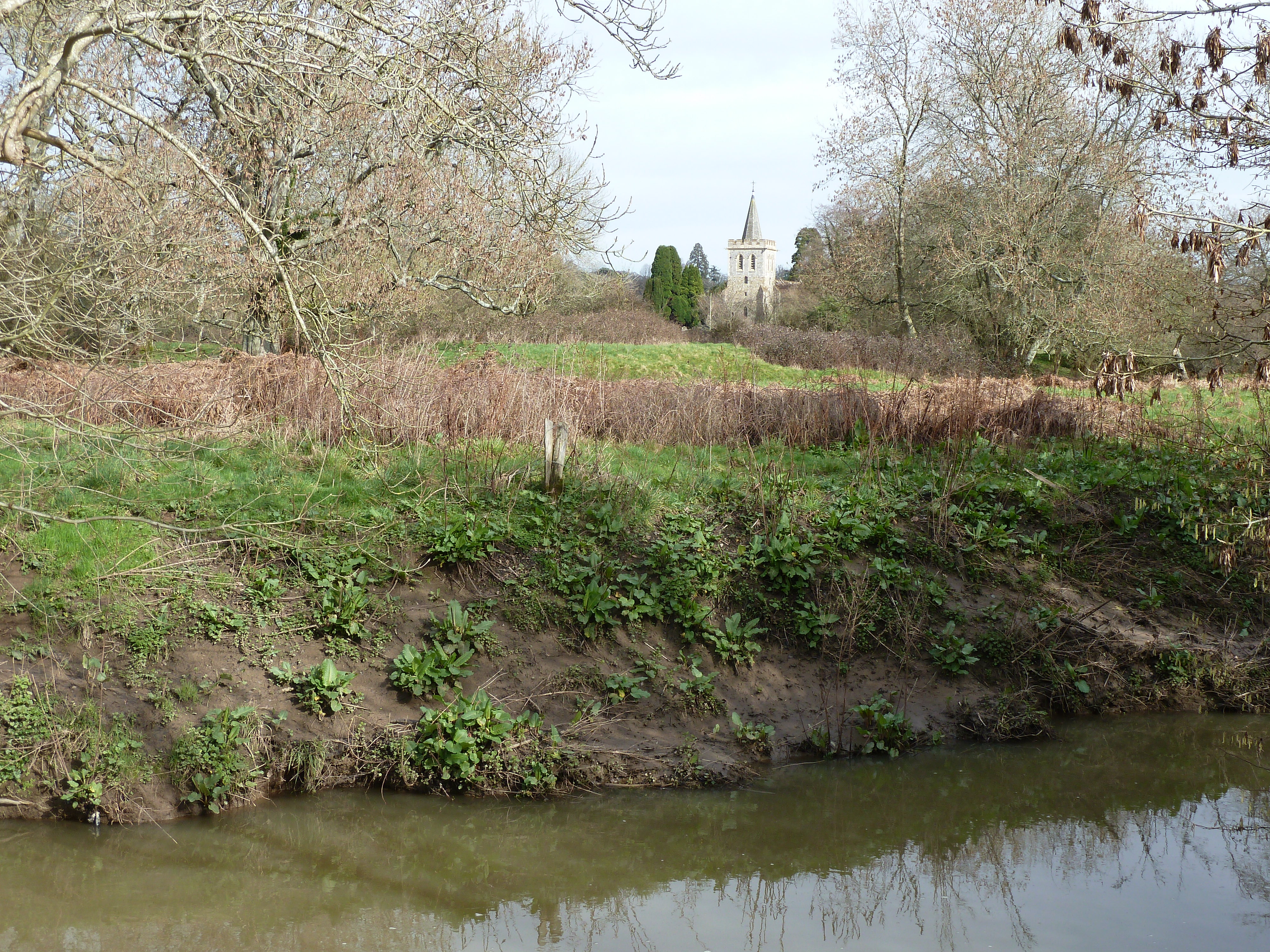
Isfield motte and bailey

The village of Isfield originally grew adjacent to the ford where the London to Lewes Way Roman road crossed the river River Ouse. The village had an active history through the Saxon, Norman eras, when a Norman castle motte was built on the river bank near the church to guard the crossing. Local legend, as recalled by William Wratten (born 1888), had it that King Harold spent the night before the Battle of Hastings in the village, at his demesne located where Isfield Place now stands.

Isfield became the home of John Shurley (died 1527), who was Cofferer of the Household to King Henry VIII. Isfield Place is a 17th-century manor house, incorporating part of the original 16th-century mansion of the Shurley family. Its design was influenced by Laughton Place nearby, following the marriage of Thomas Shurley, John's grandson, with Anne Pelham, daughter of Sir Nicholas Pelham of Laughton.

The herbalist Nicholas Culpeper spent his childhood in the village at the home of his grandfather, Rev. William Attersole, who was vicar at St Margaret's.

The area was heavily involved in the Wealden iron industry from the 15th century onwards.

Isfield again became a busy place in the 19th century. Much of its traffic was river-borne: coal and building materials, together with other products, used the Ouse as its transport. A paper-mill and a large flour-mill both made use of the river.

== Governance ==
Isfield Parish Council is the lowest level of government, above which are Wealden District Council and East Sussex County Council. It is in the Wealden parliamentary constituency in the House of Commons.

== Geography ==
The parish of Isfield stands on the flood-plain of the River Ouse, at its confluence with the River Uck and a convenient crossing point, a ford, which the Romans used; the road through the village crosses the Uck by bridge, and the erstwhile Wealden Line did likewise. The main A26 road, while crossing the parish, runs to the East of the village. The land hereabouts is a floodplain of the rivers and streams. The area can grow fine crops as a result of its rich soils with superficial deposits of Alluvium, River Terrace Deposits and Chalk Head, over Lower Chalk, Gault and Lower Greensand.

The ancient ecclesiastical parish, which is very similar to the modern civil parish, was 1,822 acres (736 ha) in size. Today's population is relatively small. The village centre lies adjacent to the river crossing; a more modern part is further south.

The two miles of Ouse brooks from Oaktree Wood, (grid reference TQ 441 180) opposite Isfield church, north to Sharpsbridge, (grid reference TQ 439 207) are important brook meadows botanically. The University of Sussex had a project to restore some of the brook meadows east of Vuggles and Bunce's Farms.

Like many places in Sussex, increased pressure for farm productivity has come at the expense of much of its natural beauty. North of Isfield was a densely wooded area, but much of the ancient woodland has been cut down, including large parts of Park Wood, Owlsbury Wood, Grove Wood, Stroodland Woods, and Foxearth Wood (a bit further west). Equally this area of the River Ouse and its tributaries have seen many losses. Just thirty years ago countless silvery Elvers (young Eels) rose up the Ouse weirs at Isfield, but they have long since gone due to pollution (nitrates, phosphates and trace chemicals) from farming and sewage with low flows from extraction and summer droughts.

=== Isfield lock and weir ===
The old Isfield Lock and weir (grid reference TQ 440 186) has recently been restored by Sussex Ouse Restoration Trust. It is much loved, "The waters thunder down the weir to a sheltered pool, whilst above, the embayed river is still enough for water lilies". On the banks of the Isfield Weir to Rocky Wood there is archaic vegetation, such as dame's violet and hemlock.

== Transport ==
The village proper is located at the intersection of three roads. Two of these – Horsted Lane and Lewes Road – both connect directly to the A26 road, which runs along the eastern edge of the parish (through the hamlet of Rose Hill), and links the parish with Uckfield and Lewes. The third road – Station Road – runs north and eventually reaches the A272 road near Piltdown.

The parish is served by two bus routes, both part of Brighton & Hove's Regency Route brand. Route 29 runs along the A26, serving Rose Hill and linking it every 30 minutes with Lewes and Brighton to the southwest and Uckfield, Crowborough and Tunbridge Wells to the northeast. Route 29A, meanwhile, runs directly through the village and operates every hour in each direction, southwest to Lewes and Brighton and northeast to Uckfield and Heathfield.

The village was once served by a railway – Isfield station, on the Wealden Line, was open from 1858 to 1969, and linked the village with Brighton, Lewes, Uckfield, Eridge and Tunbridge Wells (and on to London). Only the Brighton–Lewes and Uckfield–Eridge sections remain open today; there have been several campaigns to reopen the line between Lewes and Uckfield, although not all proposals have envisaged the reopening of Isfield station itself. A short section of the old railway, centred around the former Isfield station, has been preserved as the Lavender Line Steam Railway.

== Religion ==
The parish church is dedicated to St Margaret of Antioch. Within the church are tombs of the Shurley/Shirley family.

== Leisure, culture and sport ==
The Laughing Fish is a small public house with a garden.
