= Eastleigh Depot =

Railway maintenance depot in Eastleigh, Hampshire

- Interactive map of Eastleigh Depot

Location
- Location: Eastleigh, Hampshire
- Coordinates: 50.9591°N 1.3491°W
- OS grid: SU457180

Characteristics
- Owner: Network Rail
- Operator: Arriva TrainCare
- Depot code: EH (1973 -)
- Type: DMU

History
- Opened: 1903
- Former depot code: 70D (1963-1973); 71A (1948-1963); ELH; EGLH

Eastleigh Depot is a railway depot location in Eastleigh, Hampshire, England. The depot is situated on the South West Main Line and is near Eastleigh station. The depot code is EH.

== History ==
In 1903, the London & South Western Railway opened a 15-road locomotive shed, which closed in 1967. A two road diesel shed was opened by British Railways opened in 1958. The main shed being a four-track dead-ended shed which was extended south in 1965, and also with a four-track through-road extension on the western side. The second building is a one-track through road shed, for fuelling, which was opened in 1998.

Around 1987, the depot's allocation consisted of Classes 08, 09 and 33 locomotives and Classes 204 and 205 DEMUs. Classes 47 and 73 could also be seen stabled at the depot.

== Allocation ==
As of 2018, the depot is operated by Arriva TrainCare servicing CrossCountry Class 220 and 221 Voyagers.

== Bibliography ==
- Marsden, Colin J. (1987). BR Depots. Motive power recognition. Vol. 6. Ian Allan Ltd. ISBN 9780711017191. OCLC 18685680.
- Smith, Paul; Stuart, Philip (2010). Railway Depots. Ian Allan Ltd. ISBN 9780711034822. OCLC 528397749.
- Webster, Neil; Greengrass, Robert; Greaves, Simon (1987). British Rail Depot Directory. Metro Enterprises Ltd. ISBN 9780947773076. OCLC 20420397.
