= Isfield railway station =

Former railway station in England

Isfield
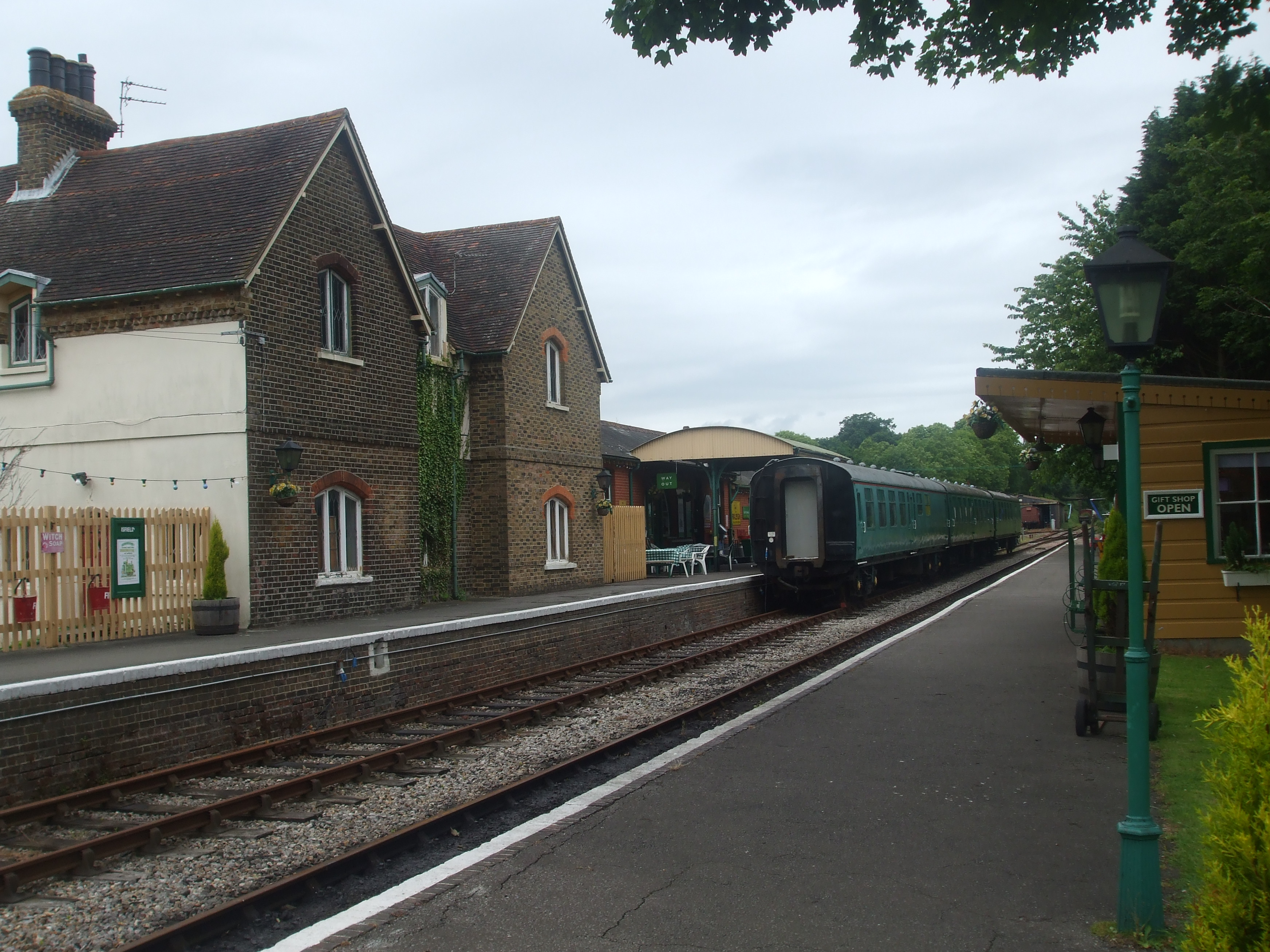

General information
- Location: Isfield, Wealden, East Sussex; England
- Coordinates: 50.93597°N 0.06509°E
- Grid reference: TQ452172
- System: Station on heritage railway
- Platforms: 2

History
- Original company: Lewes and Uckfield Railway
- Pre-grouping: London, Brighton and South Coast Railway
- Post-grouping: Southern Railway; Southern Region of British Railways

Key dates
- 18 October 1858: Opened
- 23 Feb 1969: last train ran
- 6 May 1969: Officially closed
- 16 June 1983: Sold by British Rail
Location

Isfield is a preserved railway station on the closed section of the Wealden Line which served the East Sussex village of Isfield near Uckfield. Originally opened in 1858, the station closed in 1969 and was sold into private hands in 1983 to subsequently become the current centrepiece of the Lavender Line, a heritage railway.

== History ==
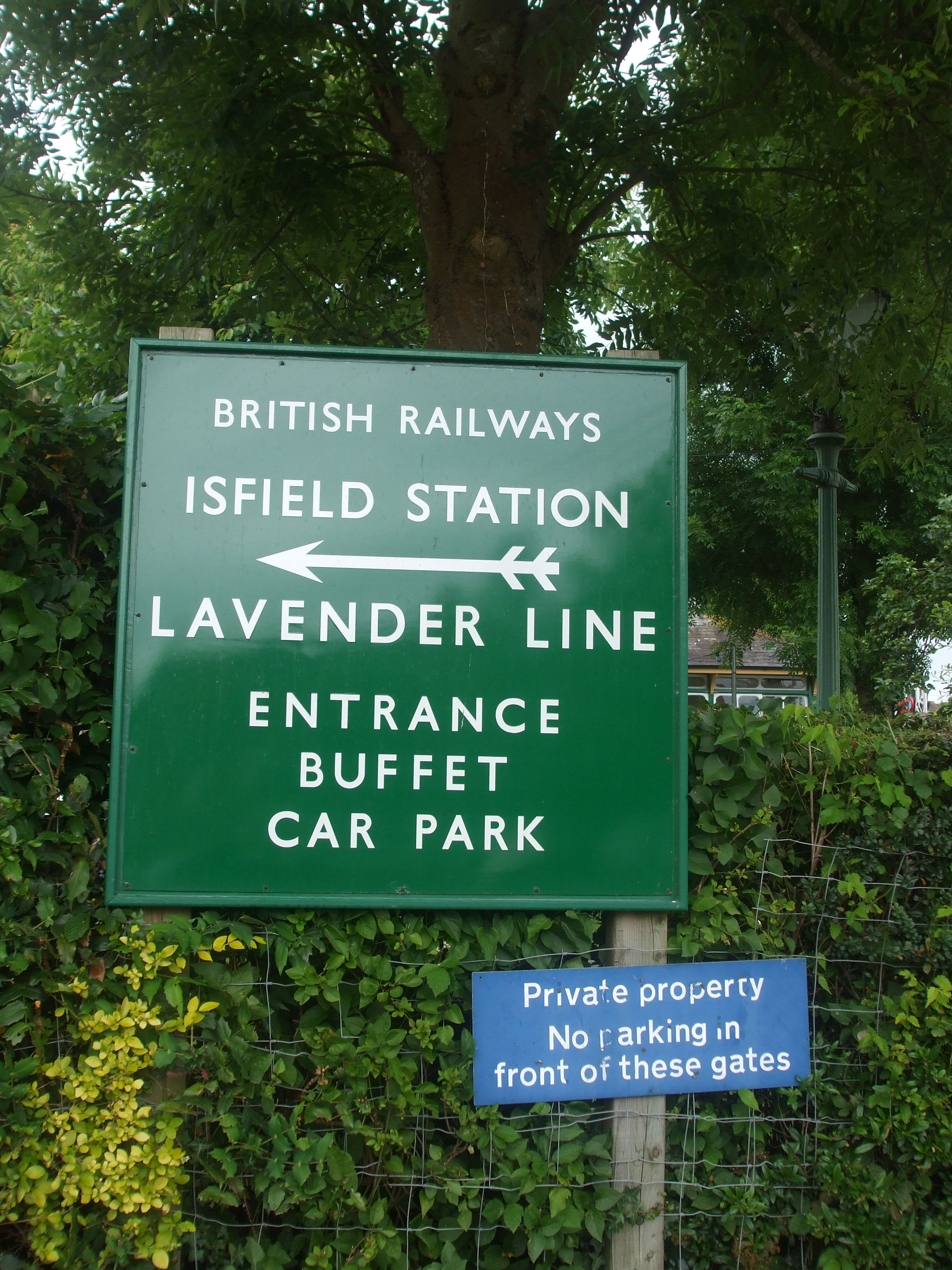
Signage

Serving the village of Isfield, it was a quiet station on the busy through-route from Brighton and Tunbridge Wells. Architecturally, it was a mirror image of Barcombe Mills station; equipped with two platforms, the main station buildings were on the Up side, whilst a small wooden waiting shelter was provided for the Down platform. There was no footbridge between the platforms, but passengers could easily cross by the level crossing just to the west of the station.

During the First World War milk churns were brought by rail to the station, a handbell being rung from the signalbox to warn of the approach of a train. The trains also carried German Prisoners of War to the village for forestry work in the area around Plashett Wood; at the end of the day, the prisoners were marched back to the station where a train would take them back to their camp.

Although the last train ran on 23 February 1969, the station remained open to issue bus tickets until the buses themselves were withdrawn on 6 May.

Preceding station	Disused railways	Following station
Uckfield; Line closed, station open	British Rail; Southern Region; Wealden Line	Barcombe Mills; Line and station closed

== Restoration ==
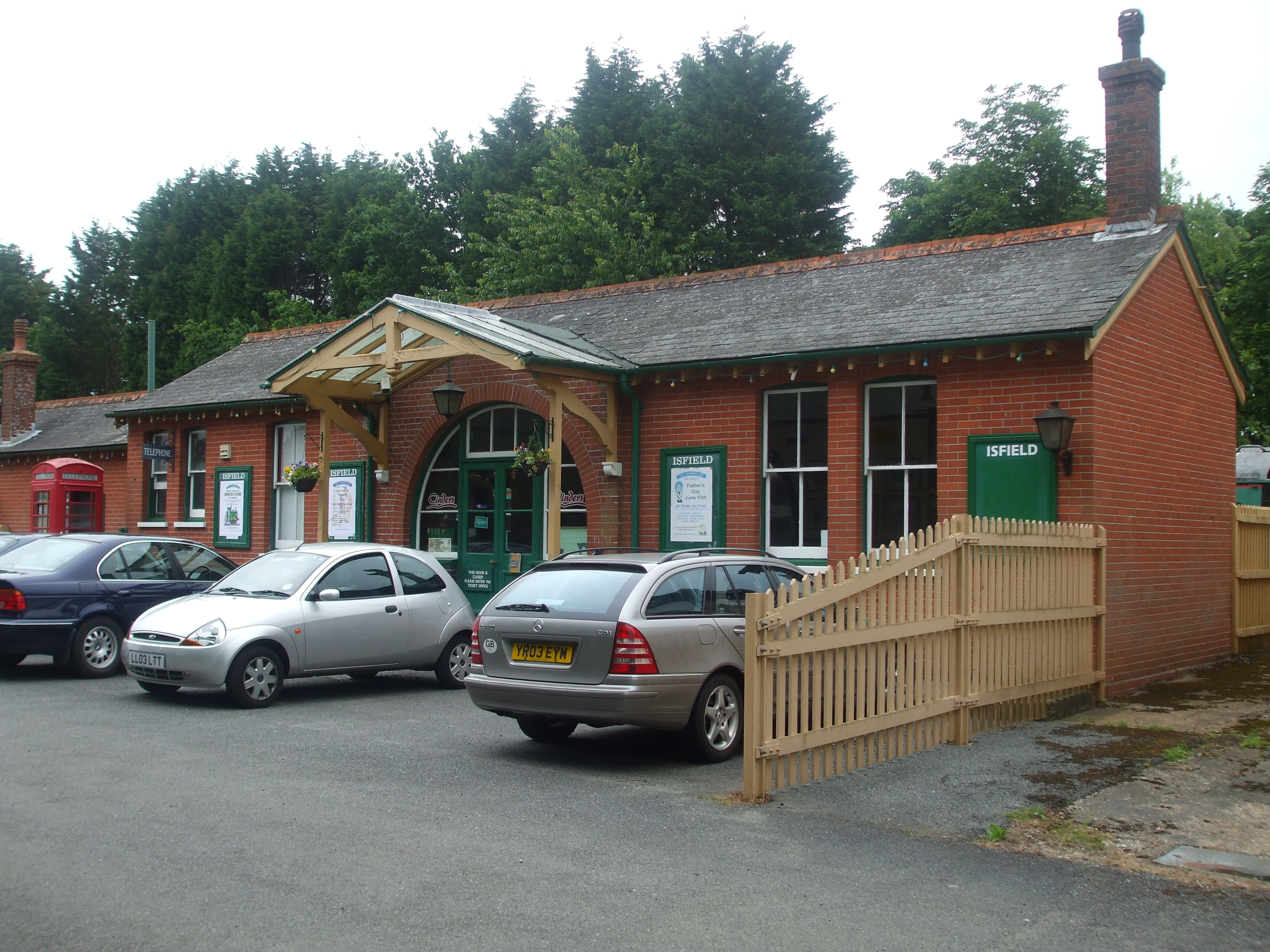
Station frontage

Following its closure in 1969 the track was removed in 1970 and the station remained neglected and overgrown gradually being covered by a shroud of trees and grass. After fourteen years of disuse, it was auctioned on 14 June 1983 by British Rail and sold for £60,500 to Dave and Gwen Milham who operated a landscaping business in the area and had attended the auction merely out of curiosity. A first inspection of the station site revealed a 3-foot (0.91 m) high carpet of grass on the platforms and trees up to 20-foot (6.1 m) high flourishing on the down line. The Saxby & Farmer signalbox was structurally sound, as was the main booking hall area which nevertheless needed new ceilings and windows, and part of the slate roof had to be relaid. However, in less than 18 months the station had been transformed back into a period working station bearing the green and yellow colours of the Southern Railway which had taken over the Wealden Line in 1923.

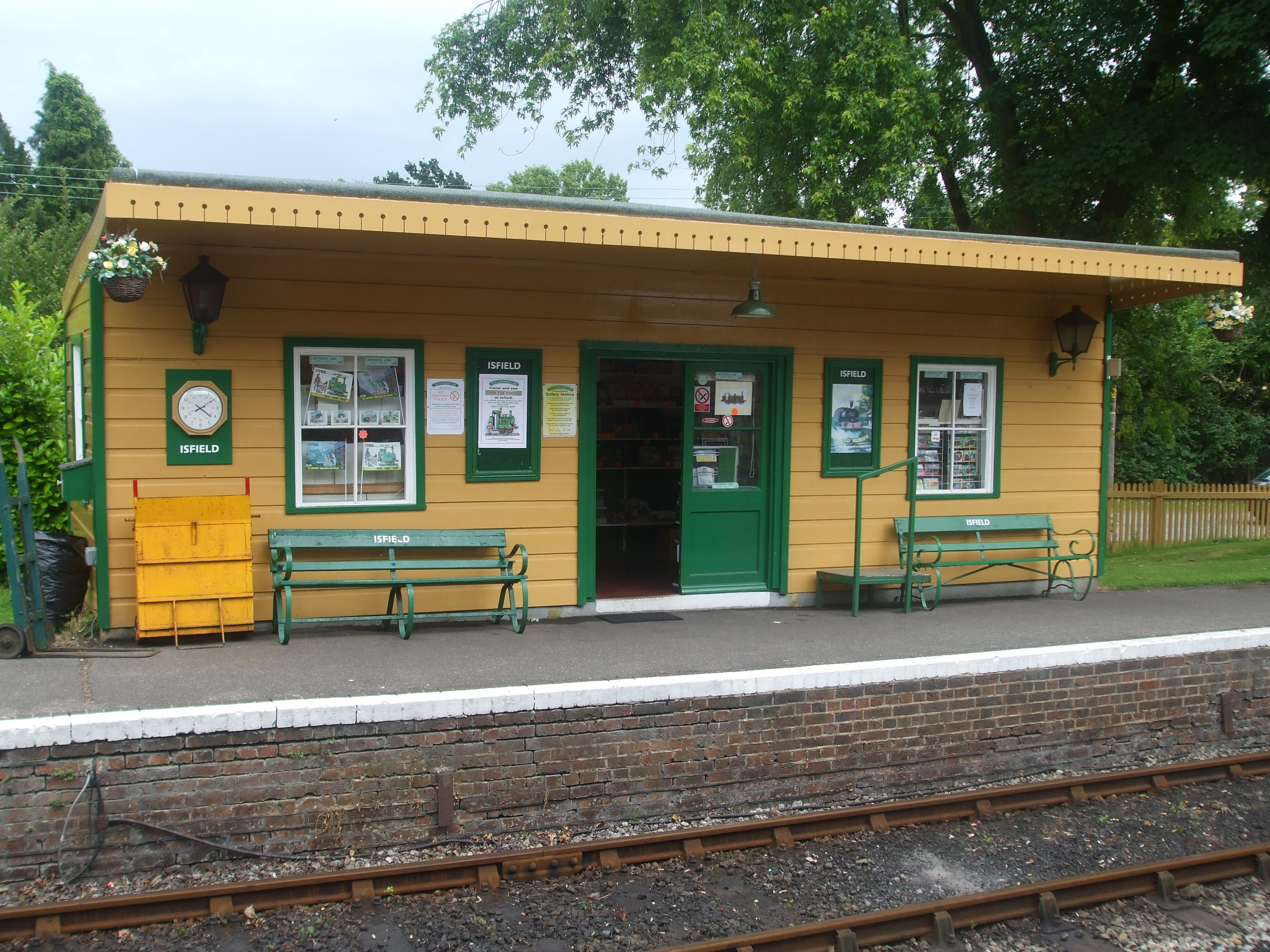
Replica waiting shelter

The wooden down waiting platform had been sold to the Bluebell Railway in 1978 and so Dave Milham had to commission a replica from local craftsman. Graffiti was sandblasted from the walls. Hanging baskets, milk churns and original gas lamps were brought in to adorn the platforms. Track materials came from a British Rail surplus at Croydon and three sidings were subsequently laid out with a small headshunt together with a special connection to facilitate the easy unloading of stock delivered by road. The Milhams converted the stationmaster's house into a family residence and made it into their home, converting the first class passengers' waiting room into a lounge area.

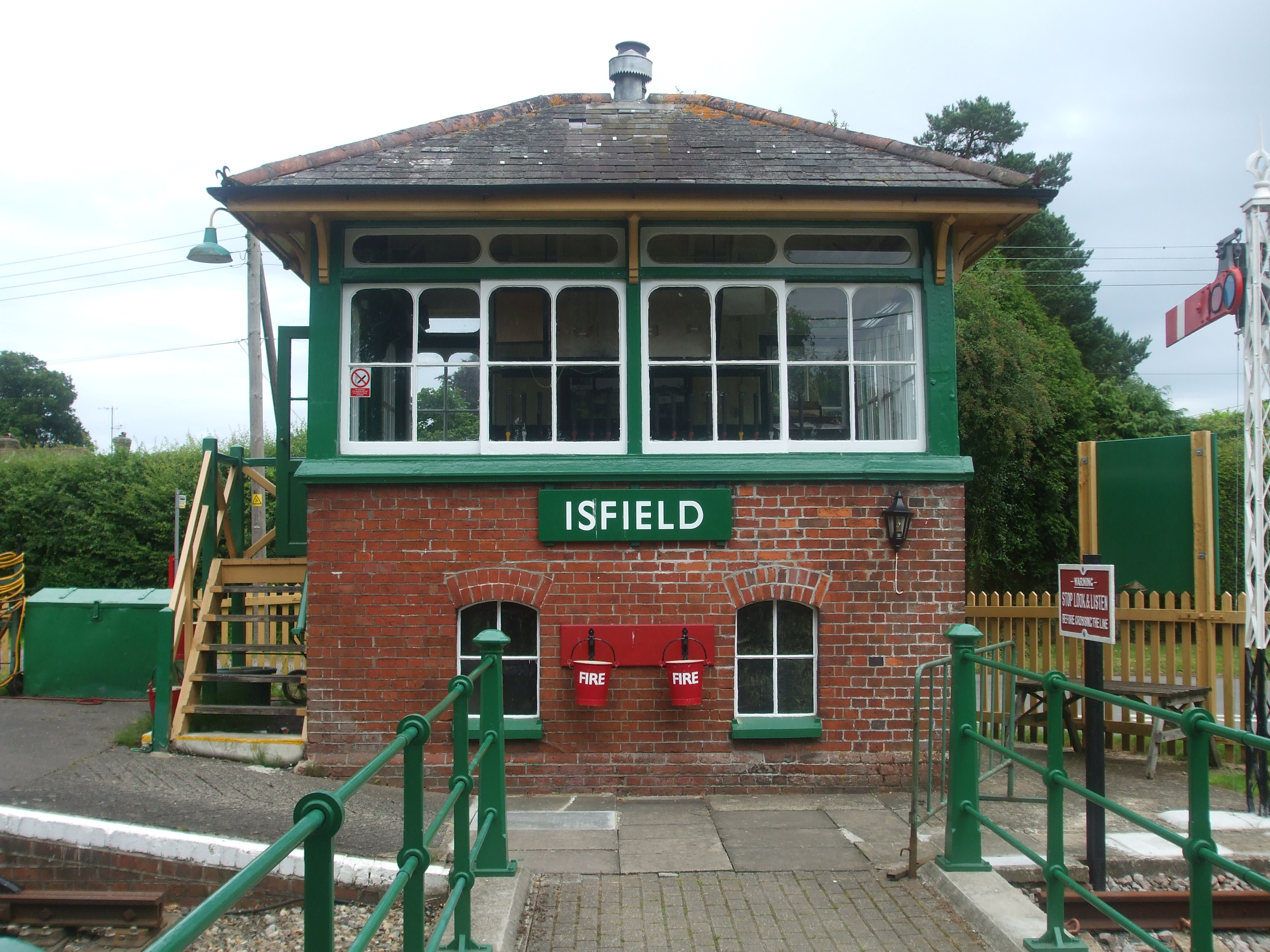
Restored signal box

It was decided to operate the station as a small heritage operation called the Lavender Line after A.E. Lavender & Sons who were the original coal merchants who operated from the station yard; lavender was also grown in the area. Rolling stock was purchased and the first engine, a Barclay 0-4-0 saddle tank locomotive (945/1904) known as "Annie", arrived on 23 February 1984, the 15th anniversary of the station's closure. The second engine, a WD Austerity 2-10-0, came to Isfield shortly afterwards and, following a year-long restoration, was the object of a visit by Dame Vera Lynn on 6 August 1985 who gave the locomotive her name. It was sold the following year to a wealthy American who gave it as a wedding anniversary present to his wife. The Dame Vera Lynn nevertheless returned to railway use, first at the Watercress Line, and now with the North Yorkshire Moors Railway.

Having invested around £750,000 into the site, Dave Milham sold his interest in the Lavender Line in 1992, leaving the operation to be taken over by the Lavender Line Preservation Society, a group of enthusiasts whose membership rose from 15 to around 300 in little under 15 months.

Preceding station	Heritage railways	Following station
Terminus	Lavender Line	Worth Halt Terminus

== Future and Possible Extensions ==
Despite attempts by the Wealden Line Campaign to have the line from Uckfield through Isfield to Lewes reopened to passenger traffic, a July 2008 study concluded that although technically feasible, the line would be "economically unviable".

The Lavender Line Preservation Society has expressed an interest in reopening the line between Uckfield and Lewes in the long-term future and has submitted proposals to East Sussex County Council, Wealden District Council and Uckfield Town Council. In December 2008, a petition was presented to East Sussex County Council requesting that it acquire the trackbed from the Lavender Line's northern boundary to the former site of Uckfield station, to lease back the section and to allow heritage services to be run over it.

In April 2009, the Council's Director of Transport and Environment recommended that the petition be refused on the basis that a heritage operation would prejudice the reopening of the line and the costs entailed would divert funding away from core Council services.
