= Barcombe Mills railway station =

Former station in Sussex, England

Coordinates: 50.91588°N 0.03148°E

Barcombe Mills
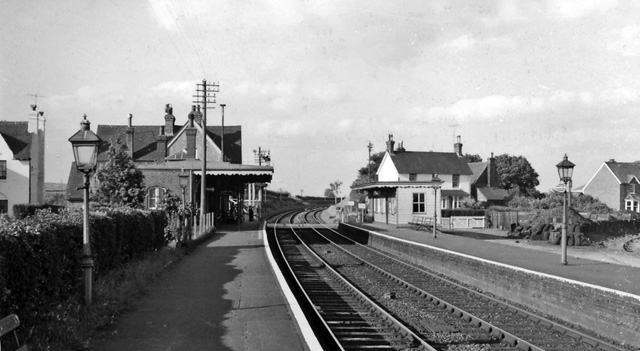
- Barcombe Mills railway station in 1961

General information
- Location: Barcombe, Lewes, East Sussex; England
- Grid reference: TQ429149
- Platforms: 2

Other information
- Status: Disused

History
- Original company: Lewes and Uckfield Railway
- Pre-grouping: London, Brighton and South Coast Railway
- Post-grouping: Southern Railway; Southern Region of British Railways

Key dates
- 18 October 1858: Opened as "Barcombe"
- 1 January 1885: Renamed (Barcombe Mills)
- 23 February 1969: last train ran
- 4 May 1969: Officially Closed
Location

Barcombe Mills is a disused railway station in the hamlet of Barcombe Mills, on the closed section of the Wealden Line. The station was opened in 1858 and closed in 1969.

== History ==
The station opened as "Barcombe" but was renamed "Barcombe Mills" in 1885 so as to avoid confusion with Barcombe station on the Lewes to East Grinstead line. Despite its name, the station is actually situated almost a mile to the south-east of Barcombe village.

It was always a popular station for anglers who were able to fish for trout in the nearby River Ouse. On pre-World War II bank holidays as many as 1000 tickets were sold in one day. The station was listed for closure under the Beeching report but closure was delayed pending the outcome of an enquiry. The last train ran on 23 February 1969 due to the condition of a bridge near Lewes but a bus service served the stations until the official closure date. The track was removed in 1970 and the station was subsequently sold.

Preceding station	Disused railways	Following station
Isfield; Line and station closed	British Rail Southern Region; Wealden Line	Lewes; Line closed, station open

== Present day ==
It was not until 1985, the year in which the station was purchased by Allan Slater, that preservation and conversion work on the virtually intact structure began in earnest. Many original Victorian features have been retained, including the scalloped woodwork along the rooftops and arched brickwork around the windows. The station was used as a tea-room/restaurant called Wheeltappers. The former ticket office and ladies' waiting room serving as a restaurant and the gentlemen's washrooms as kitchen facilities. The adjoining stationmaster's small one-bedroom house has been converted into a four-bedroom family home, and the trackbed has been filled-in and landscaped. In April 2003 two chalet-style holiday cottages were opened, resulting in the demolition of the wooden down platform waiting room. The chalets were built in a rebuilt down waiting room in the original style.

The Wealden Line Campaign has lobbied strongly for the reinstatement of the line between Lewes and Uckfield, including the section through Barcombe Mills and a feasibility study is being carried out to determine the merits of this scheme. Addressing the possibility of the return of his land to railway use, Allan Slater, still the owner of the station, has said that, "If there is genuinely a need for the railway to come through here I don't think I am in a position to stand in their way."

== Gallery ==
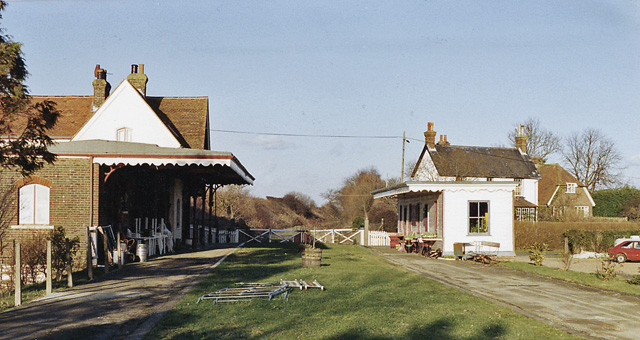
Barcombe Mills railway station in 1990

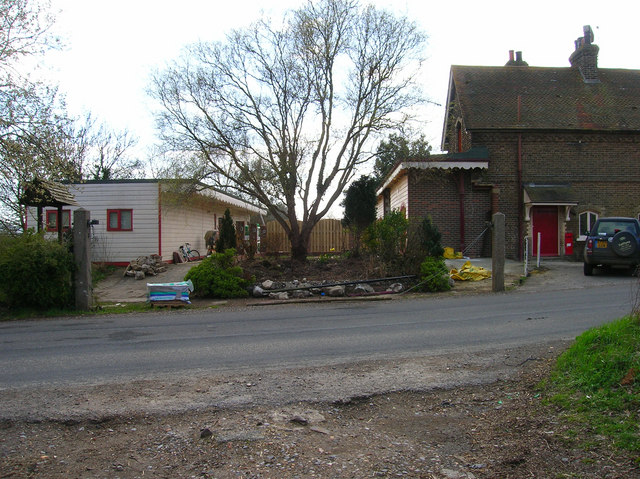
Barcombe Mills railway station in 2006

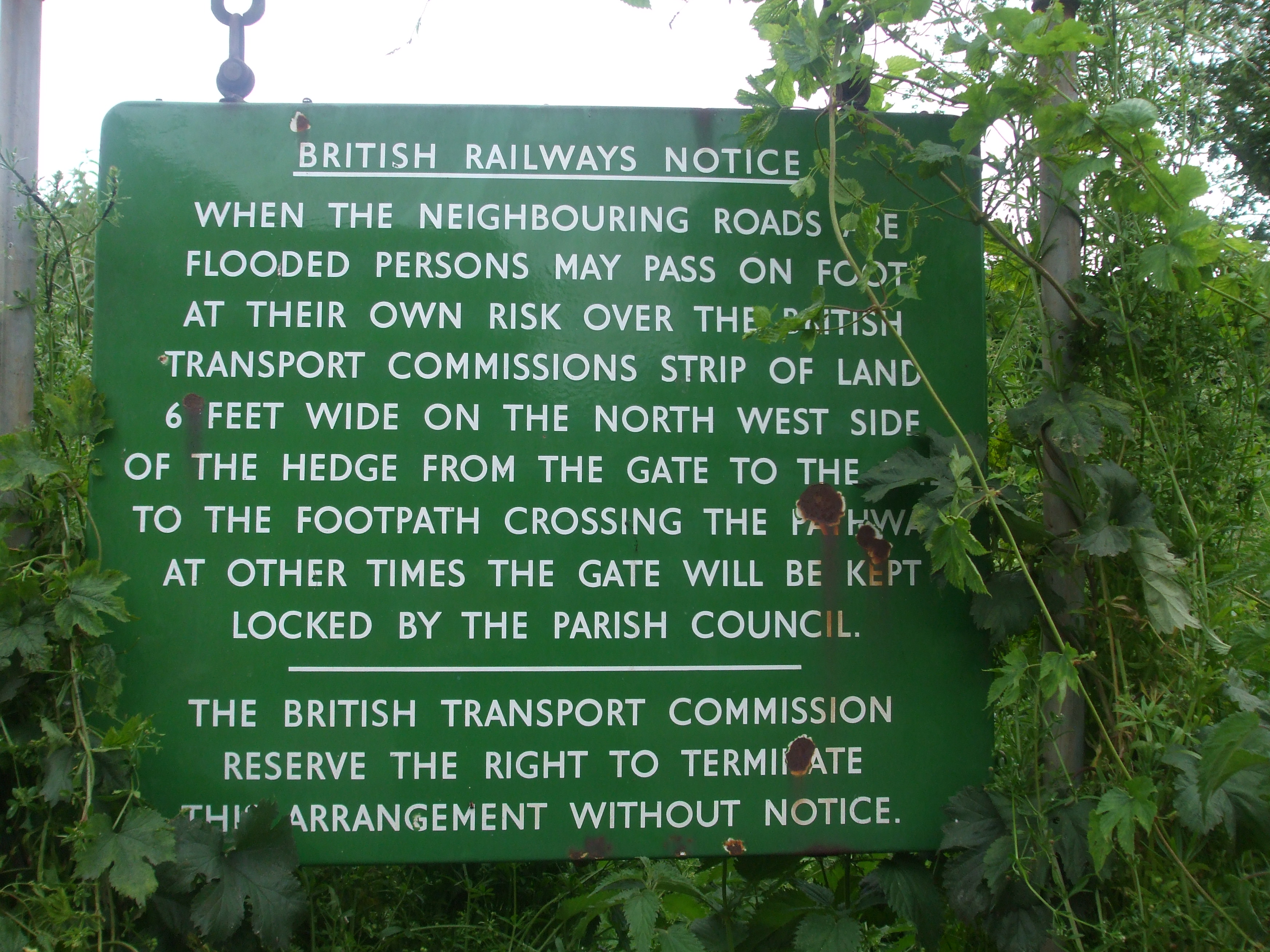
Old British Rail signage near the station
