= Mobile Maintenance Train =

British Departmental Engineering Train

Mobile Maintenance Train (MMT); DR975 / DR976 / DR978
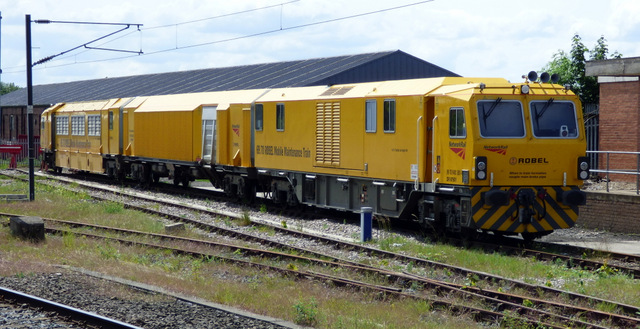
- 6U81 in Darlington Down Sidings
- Stock type: on-track plant diesel multiple unit
- In service: 2015 - Present
- Manufacturer: Robel
- Built at: Freilassing
- Family name: ROMIS SYSTEM
- Entered service: 2015-present
- Number built: 8
- Number in service: 8
- Formation: 3 cars (DM+T+DT)
- Fleet numbers: DR97501—DR97508 (motor cars); DR97601—DR97608 (trailer intermediate cars); DR97801—DR97808 (trailer cab cars)
- Operator: Network Rail
- Depot: Darlington Paddock Wood Derby Woking Retford Romford Peterborough Horsham

Specifications
- Entry: step
- Articulated sections: 3
- Maximum speed: 60 miles per hour (97 km/h)
- Prime mover: 2 × Deutz engines
- Power output: 500kw
- Track gauge: 1,435 mm (4 ft 8 1/2 in) standard gauge

The Mobile Maintenance Train (MMT) is a series of on-track plant diesel multiple units constructed for Network Rail by Robel.

== Formation ==
Each Mobile Maintenance Train consists of three cars permanently coupled together to form a singular unit.

Unit	Description	Comments
DR97501-DR97508	Traction Supply Unit	staff mess, toilet, workshop, traction power, driver's cab
DR97601-DR97608	Intermediate Car	storage and loading area
DR97801-DR97808	Mobile Maintenance Unit	enclosed working space with walls providing separation from passing trains, driver's cab

Each Unit also has a unique headcode that remains assigned to it at all times, to identify the unit as a whole, 6U81 to 6U88. Traction and onboard power is provided by a pair of 500kw Deutz engines and the working area within the MMU is 16m x 3m, with extending side walls providing upwards of 1.2m of space when needed.

== Purpose ==
The MMT was introduced in order to introduce a "Workshop on Wheels" for track workers as they conduct maintenance activities across infrastructure controlled by Network Rail. Maintenance activity can be conducted from within the train itself, with the Mobile Maintenance Unit providing separation via the use of containing walls, providing a physical barrier between workers and potentially open lines beside them. The Intermediate Car provides a storage space for Workers to bring tools and materials required for tasks directly to site, with a pair of 2 ton gantry cranes that run the length of the IC and MMU allowing for the moving of heavier equipment such as lengths of Rail. Side Walls on the IC can be lowered allowing the train to be loaded by Forklift. And a welfare facility housed in the Traction Supply Unit provides staff a place to both complete paperwork and take breaks. The MMT was estimated to create savings of over GBP 1 Million per year in maintenance costs.

== History ==
The project commenced in February 2013, and the first examples were unveiled in 2015, with the first unit, 6U81, entering service based out of Darlington Depot, followed by the second and third examples based at Paddock Wood in Kent and at Derby, with later examples being based out of Woking, Retford, Romford, Peterborough and Horsham. In April 2020, Harsco Rail was awarded a 3 year contract to maintain and operate the fleet with a two year extension option, a contract valued as being worth USD 25 Million. In 2026, the contract to operate and maintain the fleet was awarded to Colas Rail.
