= British Rail Class 204 =

Class of diesel-electric multiple unit

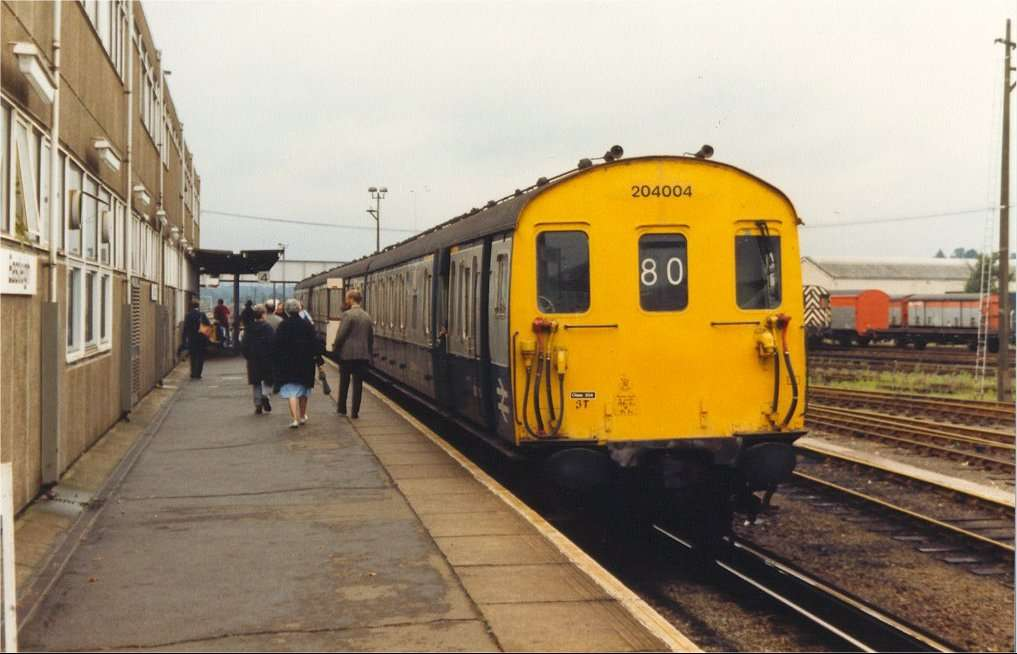
- 204004 at Eastleigh in 1986
- In service: 1957–1987
- Replaced: Steam locomotives and carriages
- Scrapped: 1987
- Number built: 8 units (3 rebuilt from Class 205)
- Number preserved: 1 driving trailer
- Number scrapped: 7 complete units
- Fleet numbers: 1401-1404; 204001-004
- Operators: British Railways
- Lines served: Southern Region

Specifications
- Prime mover(s): English Electric 4SRKT Mark II
- Power output: 600 shp (450 kW) at 850 rpm
- Track gauge: 4 ft 8 1/2 in (1,435 mm)

The British Rail Class 204 designation has been used twice for two similar types of diesel-electric multiple units.

== History ==
The original units, numbered in the range 1119-1122, were two-car versions of the Class 205 '3H' units, and were classified as 2H under the old system.

In 1979, BR decided to augment the two-car units to three-car formation. Three of the four units were reformed with the addition of centre trailers taken from 3H (Class 205) units, and thus were themselves reclassified as Class 205.

The fourth 2H unit, and the three former 3H units which had given up their trailers, were augmented by reusing the ex-2EPB driving trailers from redundant Class 206 units. The Class 204 designation was re-applied to these four newly formed units (which were also given the classification 3T under the old system). They were renumbered into the range 1401-1404. In 1986, the units were renumbered to 204001-004 to conform with the TOPS numbering system.

== Technical details ==
Power car (one per set)

- Introduced: 1957
- Weight: 56 long tons (57 t; 63 short tons)
- Engine: English Electric 4-cylinder type 4SRKT Mark II of 600 bhp (450 kW) at 850 rpm
- Transmission: Diesel-electric, two English Electric type EE507 traction motors rated at 186 kW (249 hp) (250 hp or 190 kW) each.
- Maximum tractive effort: 12,500 lbf (56,000 N)
- Driving wheel diameter: 3 ft 6 in (1,067 mm)
- Coupling code: Standard 'Buckeye' compatible with contemporary class 20x and 4xx units.
- Train heating: Electric

== Fleet details ==
Key:	Reclassified	Reformed	Scrapped

Original Class 204 (2H) Units

Unit Number	DMBSO	DTCsoL	Disbanded	Status
1119	60118	60818	3/1980	Reclassified as 3H (unit 1119) with addition of TSO 60653
1120	60119	60819	3/1980	Reclassified as 3H (unit 1120) with addition of TSO 60652
1121	60120	60820	5/1974	Reclassified as 3H (unit 1108) with addition of TSO 60657
1122	60121	60821	2/1980	Converted to 3T unit 1402 with addition of DTSso 77508

Reformed Class 204 (3T) Units

Unit Number			DMBSO	DTSso	DTCsoL	Withdrawn	Status
New	Old	Original	DMBSO	DTSso	DTCsoL	Withdrawn	Status
204001	1401	1108 *	60107	77500	60807	8/1987	Scrapped
204002	1402	1122	60121	77508	60821	11/1987	Scrapped
204003	1403	1103 *	60102	77507	60802	9/1987	Scrapped
204004	1404	1104 *	60103	77503	60803	8/1987	Scrapped

* ex-Class 205

== Preservation ==
Of the original 2H units, a single driving trailer has been preserved.

- 205008 (ex-1121) - DTCsoL 60820 - Hastings Diesels, currently at the Lavender Line.

None of the reformed 3T units are preserved.
