= Ouse Valley Railway =

Never-completed railway in England

Coordinates: 51.033°N 0.114°W

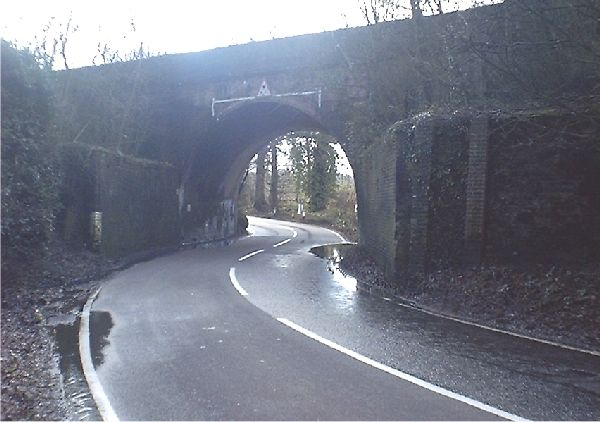
Skew bridge near the Ouse Valley Viaduct on the London to Brighton Main Line was to be one end of the line – the abutments in the foreground were built for the Ouse Valley line.

The Ouse Valley Railway was to have been part of the London Brighton and South Coast Railway (LBSCR). It was authorised by an act of Parliament in 1864 and construction of the 20-mile (32 km) long line was begun, but not completed. It never opened to traffic.

== Background ==
In the 1860s, the South Eastern Railway and the London, Chatham and Dover Railway were proposing to build railways to Brighton and Eastbourne. To counter this threat, the LBSCR proposed to build a 20-mile (32 km) long railway linking Haywards Heath, Uckfield, and Hailsham. It accepted that the line would not be profitable but it wanted to keep other companies out of its territory. Authorisation was given to extend the line to St Leonards. One tactic to be employed by the LBSCR was to build the line as slowly as possible, delaying its opening to force other companies to look elsewhere to build their lines.

== Authorisation ==
London, Brighton and South Coast Railway (Ouse Valley Line) Act 1864
- Act of Parliament
- Parliament of the United Kingdom
- Long title: An Act to enable the London, Brighton, and South Coast Railway Company to make new Railways from the Ouse Viaduct on their Main Line to Uckfield and Hailsham; and for other Purposes.
- Citation: 27 & 28 Vict. c. cxxiii

Dates
- Royal assent: 23 June 1864

Text of statute as originally enacted

An act of Parliament was needed to construct the line. This was sought in 1863 and granted as the London, Brighton and South Coast Railway (Ouse Valley Line) Act 1864 (27 & 28 Vict. c. cxxiii). In 1864, authorisation was received to extend the line to St Leonards.

== Route ==
The line was to leave the Brighton Main Line just south of Balcombe Viaduct and pass through Lindfield. From there it would follow the Ouse Valley to Sheffield Park and then pass north of Newick to Shortbridge and connect with the railway south of Uckfield, which was then the terminus of the line from Lewes.

The line would then pass through Framfield, East Hoathly, Chiddingly and Lower Horsebridge before joining the railway at Hailsham, which was then the terminus of the line from Polegate. The line would have then continued across country to Bexhill on Sea and St Leonards.

== Construction and abandonment ==
Construction of the line between Haywards Heath and Uckfield began in May 1866 – the month of the collapse of Overend & Gurney's Bank, which was a major financier of railway construction projects at the time. Work stopped in February 1867 and was not resumed.

== Remains ==
Ouse Valley Railway (West Sussex)

There is still much to be seen of the line between Haywards Heath and Uckfield. Skew Bridge across Borde Hill Lane between Haywards Heath and Balcombe (TQ 325 273) has extended abutments where the railway would have passed over the road. Each side of the road at Borde Hill (TQ 325 273) embankments survive, with a remnant of the bridge abutment on the southern side, visible from Copyhold Lane. A cutting leads to what would have been a tunnel at Kenwards Farm (TQ 325 273). In Lindfield an embankment at TQ 348 264 survives. Lindfield station would have been at TQ 351 261 with recently found remains of a brick-making kiln in what would have been the station yard. Near Sharp's Bridge there are the beginnings of cuttings either side of Buckham Hill where there would have been a short tunnel and south of Uckfield, an embankment and the only other completed bridge (TQ 456 205). Although reported as destroyed during the construction of the Uckfield Bypass in the 1990s, the bridge is still in position although in decrepit state, visited but not photographed September 2009. In April 2009, about a mile south-west of Uckfield there were two sections of embankments and cuttings, at (TQ 456 205 - TQ 452 207) and (TQ 451 208 - TQ 447 209). The remains of one bridge abutment were visible adjacent to a footpath at TQ 456 205.

== See also ==
- List of never used railways
