= British Rail Class 205 =

Class of diesel-electric multiple unit

British Rail Class 205 (3H)
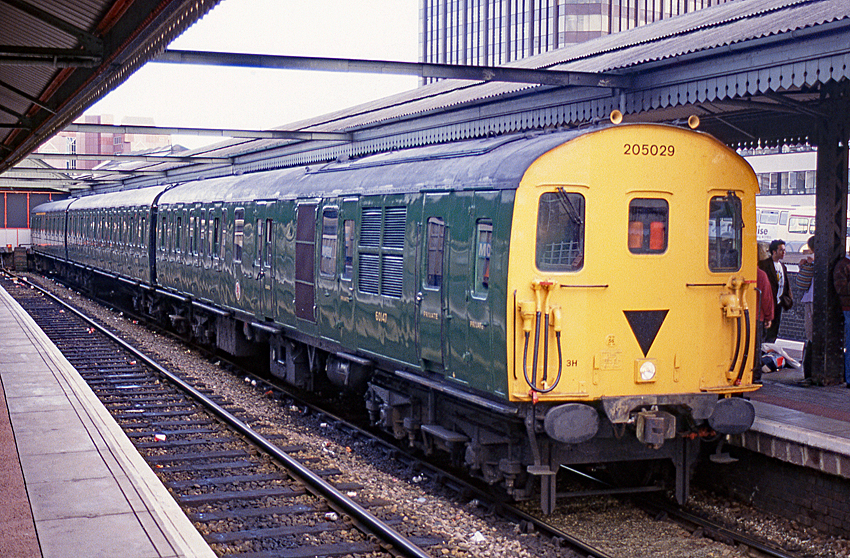
- 205029 in BR green livery at Reading in 1992
- In service: September 1957 – December 2004
- Manufacturer: BR Eastleigh
- Number built: 34 trainsets
- Formation: 2/3 cars per trainset
- Capacity: 114 2nd class, 13 1st class
- Operators: Southern Region of British Railways; Network South East; Connex South Central; Southern

Specifications
- Car length: 19.51 m (64 ft 0.1 in); 19.34 m (63 ft 5.4 in); 19.51 m (64 ft 0.1 in)
- Width: 2.8 m (9 ft 2.24 in)
- Maximum speed: 75 mph (121 km/h)
- Weight: 56 t (55.1 long tons; 61.7 short tons); 30 t (29.5 long tons; 33.1 short tons); 32 t (31.5 long tons; 35.3 short tons)
- Prime mover: English Electric 4SRKT Mark II (4-cylinder diesel)
- Power output: 600 shp (450 kW) at 850 rpm
- Coupling system: Drophead buckeye
- Track gauge: 1,435 mm (4 ft 8 1/2 in) standard gauge

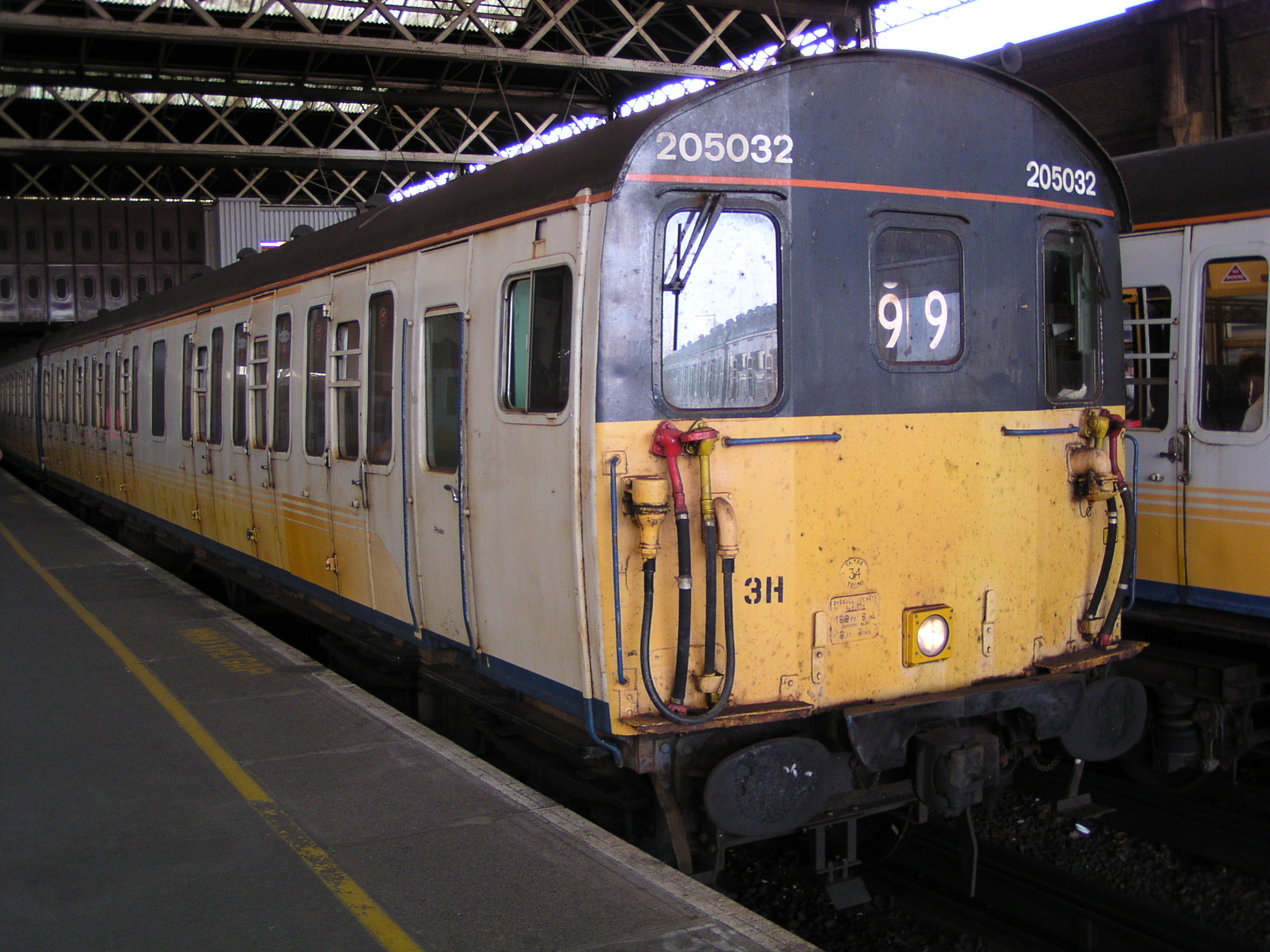
Class 205, no. 205032 at London Bridge in 2003, with a service to Uckfield. This unit is now preserved on the Caledonian Railway.

The British Rail Class 205 (3H) diesel-electric multiple units were built by BR at Eastleigh from 1957 to 1962, and in service for 47 years from BR Southern Region to Connex South Central and finally to the Southern franchise. They were eventually replaced by Class 171 Turbostar units.

== Description ==
This class of unit was built in four different batches for use on different lines.

The Southern Region class 201 to 207 DEMUs are nicknamed 'Thumpers' owing to the noise they made while in motion.

The first batch of units, numbered 1101–1118, was built in 1957 as two-car units and classified as 2H. They were built for services in Hampshire on the non-electrified routes between Portsmouth Harbour, Salisbury and Andover and between Alton, Winchester and Southampton Terminus. The first units entered service in September 1957. However, owing to increasing passenger numbers, all eighteen units were strengthened to three cars in 1958 and 1969, with the addition of a centre trailer, and therefore were reclassified as 3H units. Upon the introduction of TOPS they were reclassified as Class 205. Some of these were later converted back to 2 car sets, but they retained their Class 205 designation.

The second batch of 2H units, numbered 1119–1122, was built as 2-car units in 1958. These units were built for services on the Marshlink Line from Hastings to Ashford, and associated branch lines. These units remained as two-car sets until 1979, and were reclassified as Class 204 upon the introduction of TOPS. In May 1979, following the disbandment of the four Class 206 units, they were strengthened to three cars and redesignated as Class 205s.

The third batch of units was built as three-car sets in 1959, and numbered 1123–1126. These units were built to supplement the first batch on services in Hampshire. Collectively, the first and third batches are often called Hampshire sets. The final batch of units, numbered 1127–1133, was built in 1962 as three car sets. These units have some detail differences from the earlier batches, such as a different internal layout, and smaller route indicators. They were built for services from Reading to Salisbury, and other services in Berkshire. The final batch of units is sometimes referred to as Berkshire sets.

== Technical details ==
Power car (one per set)

- Introduced: 1957
- Weight: 56 t (55.1 long tons; 61.7 short tons)
- Engine: English Electric 4-cylinder type 4SRKT Mark II of 600 bhp (450 kW) at 850 rpm
- Transmission: Electric, two English Electric type EE507 traction motors rated at 250 hp (190 kW) each.
- Maximum tractive effort: 12,500 lbf (56 kN)
- Driving wheel diameter: 42 in (1,067 mm)
- Coupling code: Standard "Buckeye" compatible with contemporary Class 20x and 4xx units.
- Train heating: Electric

Number 1129 was experimentally fitted with a Dorman 12QTCW V-12 diesel engine of 725 shp (541 kW)

== Operations ==
The first examples of the class entered service in September 1957 after a month of testing. They were initially used on services linking Portsmouth and Southampton to Salisbury, as well as those between Southampton and Portsmouth Harbour and from Southampton to Alton/Andover. Journey times were around two-thirds of those required by the steam locomotives which the units replaced. The new services proved so popular that the class was temporarily taken off the route to Alton and Andover to provide extra capacity on the other lines prior to the fitting of a third carriage to the first 18 units.

The delivery of the second batch of four units saw the class introduced to the Marshlink Line between Ashford and Hastings. These units also ran on the Bexhill West Branch Line and the short line to New Romney and Littlestone-on-Sea, and a Sunday-only service on the Fawley Branch Line. All of these routes except for the Marshlink Line had been closed by 1967, by which time the route between Reading and Salisbury was also operated by the class. The units also operated on the Wareham to Swanage route from 1966 until its closure in 1972. Other routes served included the Steyning Line between Brighton and Horsham, which closed in 1967; the Cuckoo Line, which closed in 1968; the Lymington Branch Line, which was served by the units for two months in 1967 prior to its electrification; and some journeys on the Oxted Line, which was also served by the newer Class 207 units. In 1973 some services from Portsmouth to Bristol Temple Meads and Weston-super-Mare were converted to Class 205 operation.

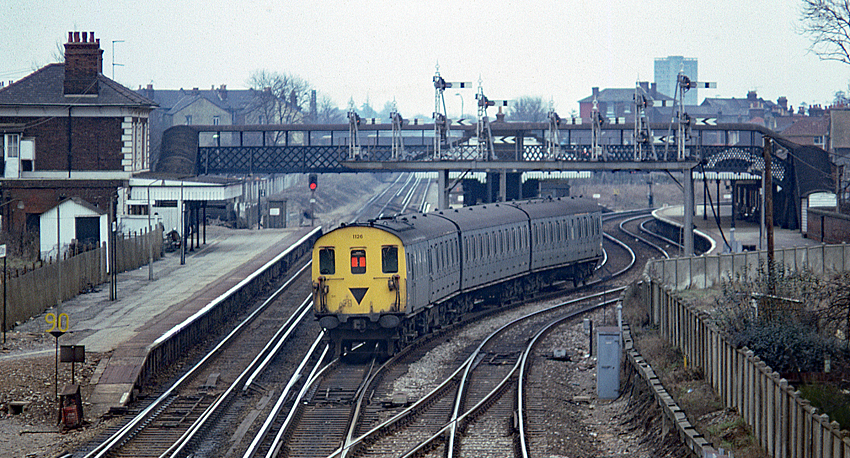
1126 (205026) in BR blue at St Denys, 1979

Soon after introduction, an orange "V" shape was painted on the motor-coach in order to provide an early visual indication to station staff that there was no brake van at the other end of the unit. With the introduction of yellow warning panels the orange V was replaced by an inverted black triangle; this being extended at this time to all Southern Region two- and three-car multiple units.

The electrification of the line to East Grinstead in 1987 saw the majority of the class withdrawn. Those which survived largely operated on services from Ashford to Hastings and from London to Uckfield. The privatisation of British Rail in 1995/6 saw the surviving Class 205s, most of which now carried Network SouthEast livery, pass to the new Connex South Central franchise.

In 1966, unit number 1102 was used in the film "The Great St. Trinian's Train Robbery".

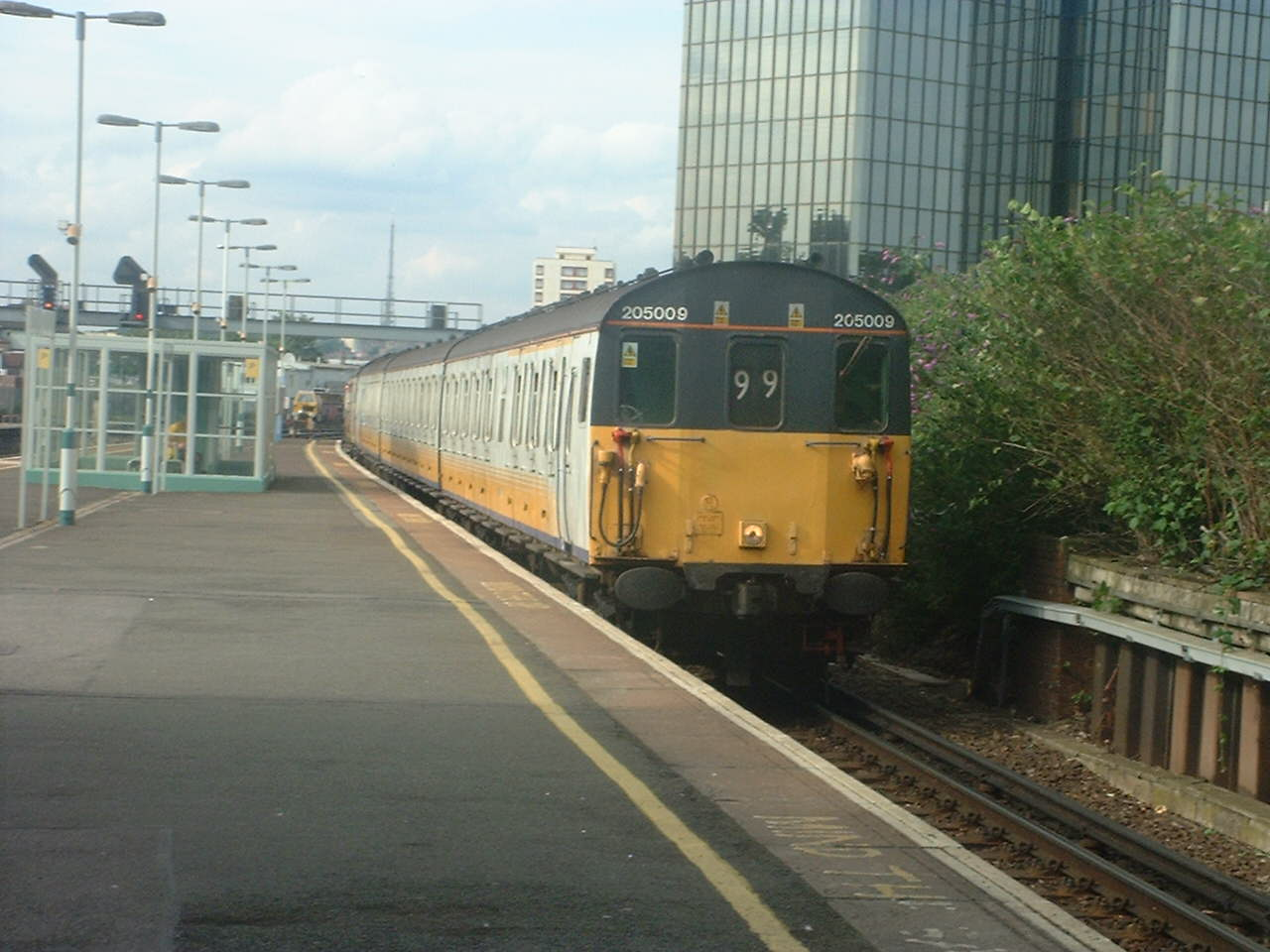
205009 in Connex South Central colours in 2004 at East Croydon prior to preservation.

When Govia won the South Central franchise in 2001, a franchise commitment was to replace all Mark 1 rolling stock by 2005, as it did not meet modern health and safety requirements. Southern ordered Turbostar trains of Class 171 and Class 170 (later converted to Class 171) from 2003 onwards to replace the Class 205s. The final units, numbers 205001/009/033 were withdrawn in mid-December 2004.

== Accidents and incidents ==
- On 31 July 1989, unit 205101 collided with a van on the level crossing at Appledore.
- At 08:27 on 15 October 1994, the Cowden rail crash occurred, involving a head-on collision between two trains in heavy fog. The branch line is from Hurst Green junction near Oxted, south to Uckfield and at this point is single track. The northbound train failed to wait at the Ashurst loop and entered the single line section at Blackham junction against the red signal at OD58. The southbound train driver, unaware of the train coming towards him on the same track, pulled away from Cowden and the two units collided around 269 m (294 yd) south of the station. Units involved were 205029 with 205032 and 205018 with 205001.

== Fleet details ==
Key:	In service	Withdrawn	Preserved	Rebuilt	Reformed	Departmental use	Scrapped

Unrefurbished Class 205/0

Unit No.		Batch	Year built	Final livery	DMBSO	TSO	DTCsoL	Withdrawn	Status
New	Old	Batch	Year built	Final livery	DMBSO	TSO	DTCsoL	Withdrawn	Status
205001	1101	Batch 1	1957	BR Blue	60154	-	60800	12/2004	Preserved, at The East Kent Railway
205002	1102	Batch 1	1957	NSE	60155	60651	60801	1991	Scrapped
-	1103	Batch 1	1957	Blue/Grey	60102	60652	60802	1979	Converted to Class 204 no. 1403
-	1104	Batch 1	1957	Blue/Grey	60103	60653	60803	1979	Converted to Class 204 no. 1404
205005	1105	Batch 1	1957	Blue/Grey	60104	60654	60804	08/1987	Scrapped
205006	1106	Batch 1	1957	Blue/Grey	60105	60655	60805	09/1987	Scrapped
205007	1107	Batch 1	1957	Blue/Grey	60106	60656	60806	09/1987	Scrapped
-	1108	Batch 1	1957	Blue/Grey	60107	60657	60807	1979	Converted to Class 204 no. 1401
205009	1109	Batch 1	1957	Chocolate & Cream	60108	60658	60808	12/2004	Preserved at the Eden Valley Railway
205010	1110	Batch 1	1957	Blue/Grey	60198	60659	60809	09/1987	Scrapped
-	1111	Batch 1	1957	Blue/Grey	60110	60660	60810	1980	Rebuilt to become 205101
205012	1112	Batch 1	1957	Connex	60111	60661	60811	02/2004	Scrapped 2005
-	1113	Batch 1	1957	Blue/Grey	60112	60662	60812	04/1986	Scrapped
205014	1114	Batch 1	1957	Blue/Grey	60113	60663	60813	10/1989	Scrapped
205015	1115	Batch 1	1957	NSE	60114	60664	60814	10/1993	Scrapped
205016	1116	Batch 1	1957	NSE	60115	60665	60815	08/1994	Scrapped
205017	1117	Batch 1	1957	Blue/Grey	60116	60666	60816	09/1987	Scrapped
205018	1118	Batch 1	1957	BR Blue	60117	-	60828	08/2004	Preserved at Lavender Line.
205019	1119	Batch 2	1958	Blue/Grey	60118	60653	60818	08/1987	Scrapped
205020	1120	Batch 2	1958	Blue/Grey	60119	60652	60819	09/1987	Scrapped
205008	1121	Batch 2	1958	NSE	60120	60657	60820	10/1993	Preserved at Lavender Line
-	1122	Batch 2	1958	Blue/Grey	60121	-	60821	See Class 204 (never officially classified as a 205)	
205023	1123	Batch 3	1959	BR Green	60122	60669	60822	01/1999	Preserved, unit split up. 60822 under restoration.
205024	1124	Batch 3	1959	NSE	60123	60668	60823	07/2000	Scrapped.
205025	1125	Batch 3	1959	BR Green	60124	-	60824	05/2004	Preserved at the Watercress Line.
205026	1126	Batch 3	1959	Blue/Grey	60125	60671	60825	11/1990	Scrapped
205027	1127	Batch 4	1962	-	60145	-	-	08/1994	Sandite unit 930301. 60145 at St Leonards.
205028	1128	Batch 4	1962	Faded Connex	60146	60673	60827	11/2004	Formerly preserved at Dartmoor Railway, sold to the Caledonian Railway in 2021.
205029	1129	Batch 4	1962	BR Green	60147	60667	60817	1994	Scrapped after Cowden rail crash
205030	1130	Batch 4	1962	NSE	60148	60675	60829	11/1992	Scrapped
205031	1131	Batch 4	1962	Blue/Grey	60149	-	-	07/1993	Sandite unit 930301. 60149 at St Leonards.
205032	1132	Batch 4	1962	BR Green	60150	60677	60831	10/2004	Formerly preserved at Dartmoor Railway, sold to the Caledonian Railway in 2021. Operational
205033	1133	Batch 4	1962	BR Green	60151	-	60832	12/2004	Preserved, at The Lavender Line

Refurbished Class 205/1

Unit No.		Batch	Year converted	Final livery	DMBSO	TSO	DTSOL	Withdrawn	Status
205101	1111	Batch 1	1980	NSE	60110	60660	60810	1995	Converted to 205205

Refurbished Class 205/2

Unit No.		Batch	Year converted	Final livery	DMBSO	TSOL	DTSOL	Withdrawn	Status
205205	205101	Batch 1	1995	NSE (Connex before preservation)	60110	-	60810	07/2004	Preserved at Epping Ongar Railway

Departmental units

Unit No.		Batch	Year converted	Final livery	DMB	T	DMB	Withdrawn	Status
930301	951069	Batch 4 (*Batch 1)	1993	Railtrack Brown	977939 (60145)	977870 (60660*)	977940 (60149)	-	Withdrawn from St Leonards TMD

== Preservation ==
Due to a generous disposal policy by Porterbrook Leasing, nearly all of the final units in service were preserved. The only unit not preserved was no. 205012, which had poor bodywork and donated its engine to the only surviving unrefurbished Class 207 unit.

- 205001 - East Kent Railway (2-car unit)
- 205008 - (DTCsoL 60820) Preserved by the Hastings Diesels Group at St Leonards-on-Sea, on loan to the Lavender Line (Can operate with unit 205033)
- 205009 - Eden Valley Railway (3-car unit)
- 205018 - (DTCsoL 60828 from 205029) Lavender Line (2-car unit)
- 205023 - (DTCsoL 60822) and TSO 60669 (from 205024) at Swindon and Cricklade Railway. TSO 60669 was to be stripped for spares to restore DTCsoL 60822 and then scrapped; in the event both were beyond repair and stripped. DMBS 60122 at Lavender Line)
- 205025 - Mid-Hants Railway (2-car unit)
- 205027 - (DMBSO 60145) Stored at St Leonards Depot with DMBSO 60149
- 205028 - Dartmoor Railway, later Caledonian Railway (Brechin) (3-car unit)
- 205031 - (DMBSO 60149) Stored at St Leonards Depot with DMBSO 60145
- 205032 - Dartmoor Railway, later Caledonian Railway (Brechin) (3-car unit)
- 205033 - (TSO 60678 at Cold Norton, DMBS 60151 and DTCsoL 60832 at Lavender Line)(60151 can operate with DTCsoL 60820)
- 205205 - Epping Ongar Railway (2-car unit)

== Models ==
An OO gauge kit is available from DC Kits. Dapol announced (May 2008) that a limited edition OO RTR model (to be followed by an N gauge version) of the Class 205 would be produced in collaboration with Kernow Model Rail Centre. Manufacture was switched to Bachmann in March 2010 and the model was released in February 2013. The model was produced in BR green and Connex white/yellow liveries.
