= Lavender Line =

Heritage railway in East Sussex, England

Coordinates: 50°56′07″N 0°03′54″E

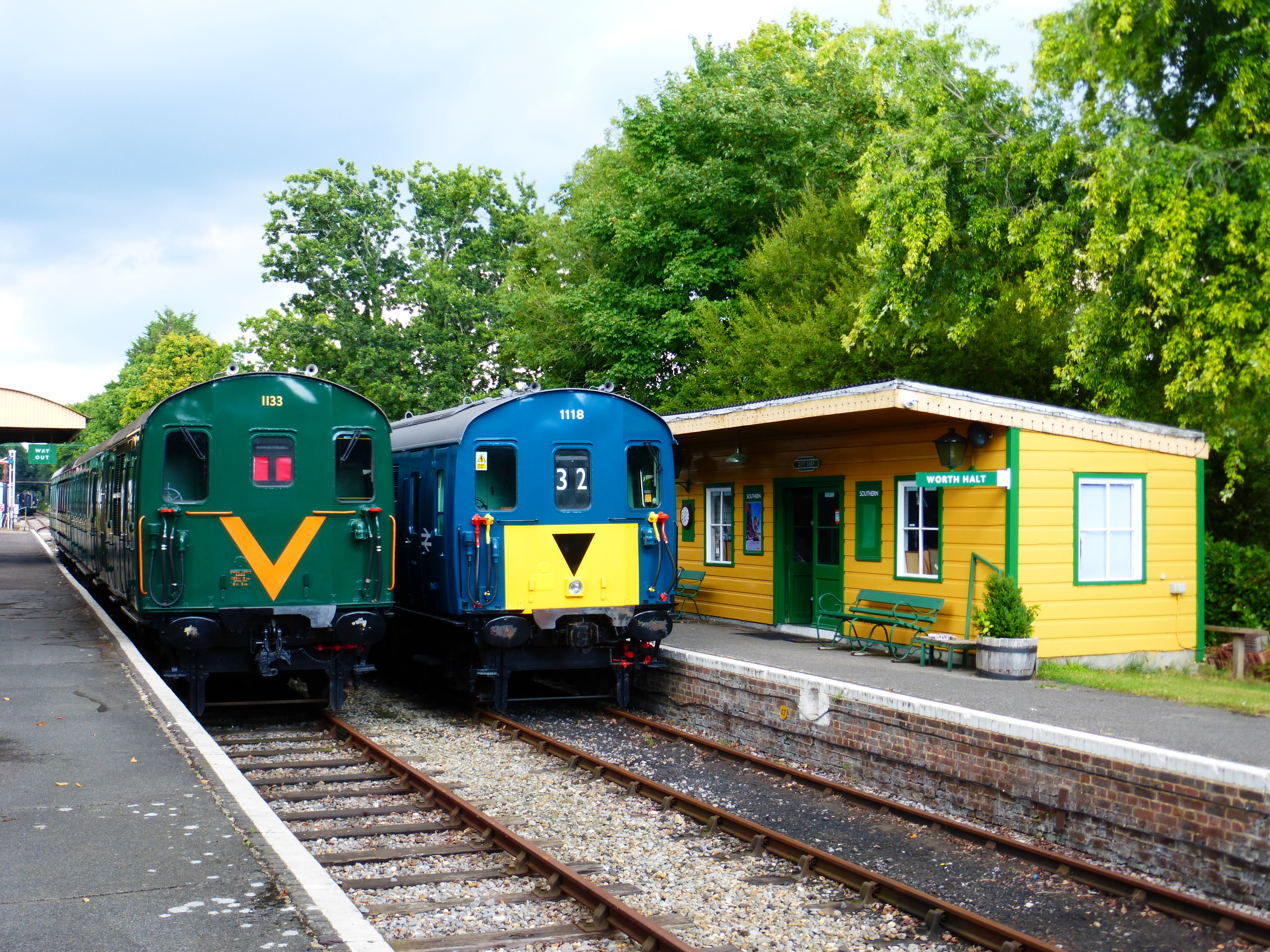
- DEMUs 1133 and 1118 in Isfield station in 2022
- Locale: near Uckfield in East Sussex

Commercial operations
- Original gauge: 4 ft 8 1/2 in (1,435 mm) standard gauge

Preserved operations
- Owned by: Lavender Line Preservation Society
- Stations: 2
- Length: 1 mi (1.6 km)
- Preserved gauge: 4 ft 8 1/2 in (1,435 mm) standard gauge

Commercial history
- Opened: 1858
- Closed: 1969

Preservation history
- Headquarters: Isfield Station

The Lavender Line is a heritage railway based at Isfield Station, near Uckfield in East Sussex, England.

== History ==
The Lavender Line was originally part of the Lewes to Uckfield Railway opened to the public on 18 October 1858. This independent company became part of the London, Brighton and South Coast Railway (LB&SCR) in 1864 to safeguard that company's interests east of its London to Brighton main line. Ten years from its opening, Isfield saw through workings from Brighton to Tunbridge Wells and later Tonbridge, via a new Uckfield–Groombridge link. The Uckfield to Lewes section was doubled at this time, though the extension north of Uckfield was single track until 1894.

Prior to 1868 trains from Uckfield travelling south to Lewes joined the Keymer Junction to Lewes line north of Lewes at Hamsey, latterly called the "Hamsey Loop". In order to avoid reversal of trains to Brighton at Lewes the 1868 works included abandoning the Hamsey Loop with the heavily engineered new line entering Lewes from the east. In Lewes the new line traversed a bridge over the River Ouse then a bridge over Cliffe High Street and some sidings to Lewes Station via a number of embankments and there were two other substantial new bridges further north. The mileage of the line also changed following this route alteration, with the zero milepost now at Brighton, Isfield's location was now 13.6 miles (21.9 km).

The East Grinstead line, opened in 1882 and closed in 1958, part of which now forms the Bluebell Railway, branched off the line at Culver Junction, near Culver Farm between Lewes and Barcombe Mills (the next station south of Isfield).

== Closure ==
As early as 1964 BR was aware of planned road works in and around the Lewes area, in which a bypass around Lewes was planned. As part of this the building of the Phoenix Causeway (Phase 1 of 3) meant a section of the Lewes to Uckfield railway line was in the way – requiring either a level crossing or a road bridge. BR applied for an Act of Parliament to reinstate the Hamsey loop as there were also concerns about the condition of some of the bridges on the 1878 route. Despite this, in 1966, the local Transport Users' Consultative Committee received notification from BR that the line from Lewes to Hurst Green Junction was to close in its entirety. This was because the line was one of those proposed for closure as unremunerative in the first Beeching report published in 1963.

Opposition from the many railway travellers resulted. Their case used a motorway costing formula to show that the users would waste some £750,000 in excess travel compared to BR's calculated loss of only £260,000. In the end the TUCC upheld the users' complaints and the line did not close. In early 1968 BR made another attempt to close the line. This time the Transport Minister, Barbara Castle, requested more information from BR, which was furnished to her successor, Richard Marsh, who took over as Transport Minister in April 1968.

From the information requested by his predecessor, and of all the scenarios that were examined by the Minister, he agreed in August 1968 to the closure of the Lewes to Uckfield section of line. Considerable opposition from the users centred, in the first instance, around the inadequate replacement bus service – which had Ministerial approval. The issue was resolved by the Transport Commissioners who, on examination of all the complaints from the users and undertaking the journey themselves, upheld the users' complaints. Structural problems with the bridge over Cliffe High Street in Lewes were identified, which necessitated single-line working and from January 1969 a revised timetable with trains connecting at Barcombe Mills in place. However concerns over the state of the bridge over Cliffe High Street remained and finally the BR Chief Civil Engineer declared the bridge unsafe. The last train at Isfield was on 24 February 1969 but a rail replacement bus service operated until 6 May, with the station closing on that date, the tickets latterly being sold from the signal box.

The remaining section of the line, from Uckfield to Hurst Green Junction had been refused closure by the Minister as there was a social need for the line and, in accordance with Section 39 of the Transport Act 1968, a subsidy could be paid with Treasury approval for a three-year period.

The route between Lewes and Uckfield has been protected from development in various local and structure plans since the mid-1970s. This attempts to ensure that nothing further is built which could prevent the line from re-opening. This planning policy protection still remained in force in 2008. Sale of the track bed and stations was postponed for some 15 years by a number of unsuccessful attempts to re-open the closed section of line. A short length of track used as a headshunt remained south of Uckfield. This extended to a bridge over the river Uck (approximately 1/4 mile (0.40 km) north of the present Worth Halt) until the Uckfield bypass (opened 1985) severed the trackbed. Further truncation occurred when Uckfield station was moved north of the high street in 1991.

== Private ownership and initial restoration ==
On 16 June 1983 Isfield railway station was purchased at auction by Dave and Gwen Milham both as a depot for their landscaping business and with restoration of the station in mind. The booking hall and signal box were renovated, the station awning refurbished, and all the platform signs were replaced. The original down platform waiting room had been purchased by the Bluebell Railway in 1978, and moved to Sheffield Park station. Two months were spent constructing a replica on the original foundations, completed in January 1984. In cooperation with the Bluebell Railway Dave Milham purchased track material from British Rail, made available from work being done at Croydon. Initially track was laid as part of a cosmetic restoration with a static locomotive but this later became a working railway.

Restoration of the station was completed by the spring of 1987 with the reinstatement of 1/4 mile (0.40 km) of permanent way on the original track bed. A new engine shed was constructed at Isfield as an extension to the owner's groundworks machinery shed. The total cost of restoration exceeded £750,000 according to the Milhams.

The station was named 'The Lavender Line' since A.E. Lavender and Sons were the local coal merchants who had operated from the station yard. Two engines were purchased for use at the station: 'Annie', a Barclay 0-4-0 saddle tank previously in service at Bury Transport Museum, and 'Ugly', RSH 0-6-0 saddle tank number 64, purchased while on loan at the North Yorkshire Moors Railway. A third engine, a 2-10-0 built in WWII by the North British Locomotive Company was shipped from Greece to the United Kingdom. The engine was christened 'Dame Vera Lynn' by Dame Vera Lynn herself at the station on 6 August 1986. This engine proved too large for the then 1/4 mile (0.40 km) railway, however, and was sold to Clifford Brown, a British-born American businessman living in Virginia, USA. Mr Brown sent the engine to the North Yorkshire Moors Railway where it now resides.

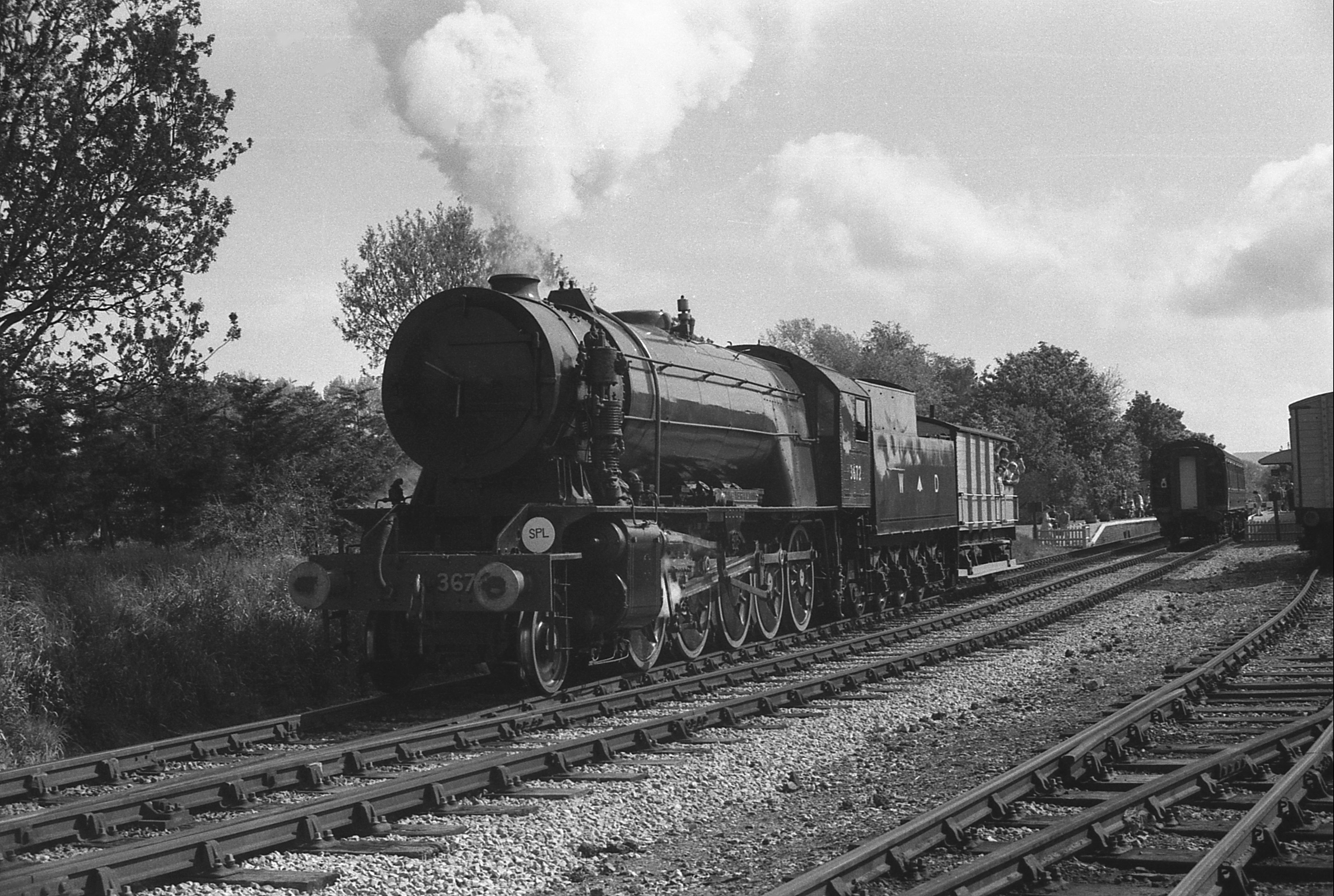
WD Austerity 2-10-0 'Dame Vera Lynn' departing Isfield.

== Preservation Society ==
Mr Milham's business failed in 1991 and the Lavender Line was put up for sale, initially for £1.3 million. This sale and a later auction seeking around £500,000 were not successful. Eventually, in November 1992, the railway (without the station house) was bought from Mr Milham's bankers by Lavender Line Ltd. The Lavender Line Ltd is in turn controlled by the Lavender Line Preservation Society, a registered charity formed initially by volunteers who had helped Mr Milham. The first public trains under the new owners operated on Sunday 30 May 1993 after significant track alterations required by the Railway Inspectorate. The initial 1/4 mile (0.40 km) has subsequently been extended to just under 1 mile (1.6 km) with the line terminating at the first of two bridges over the river Uck.

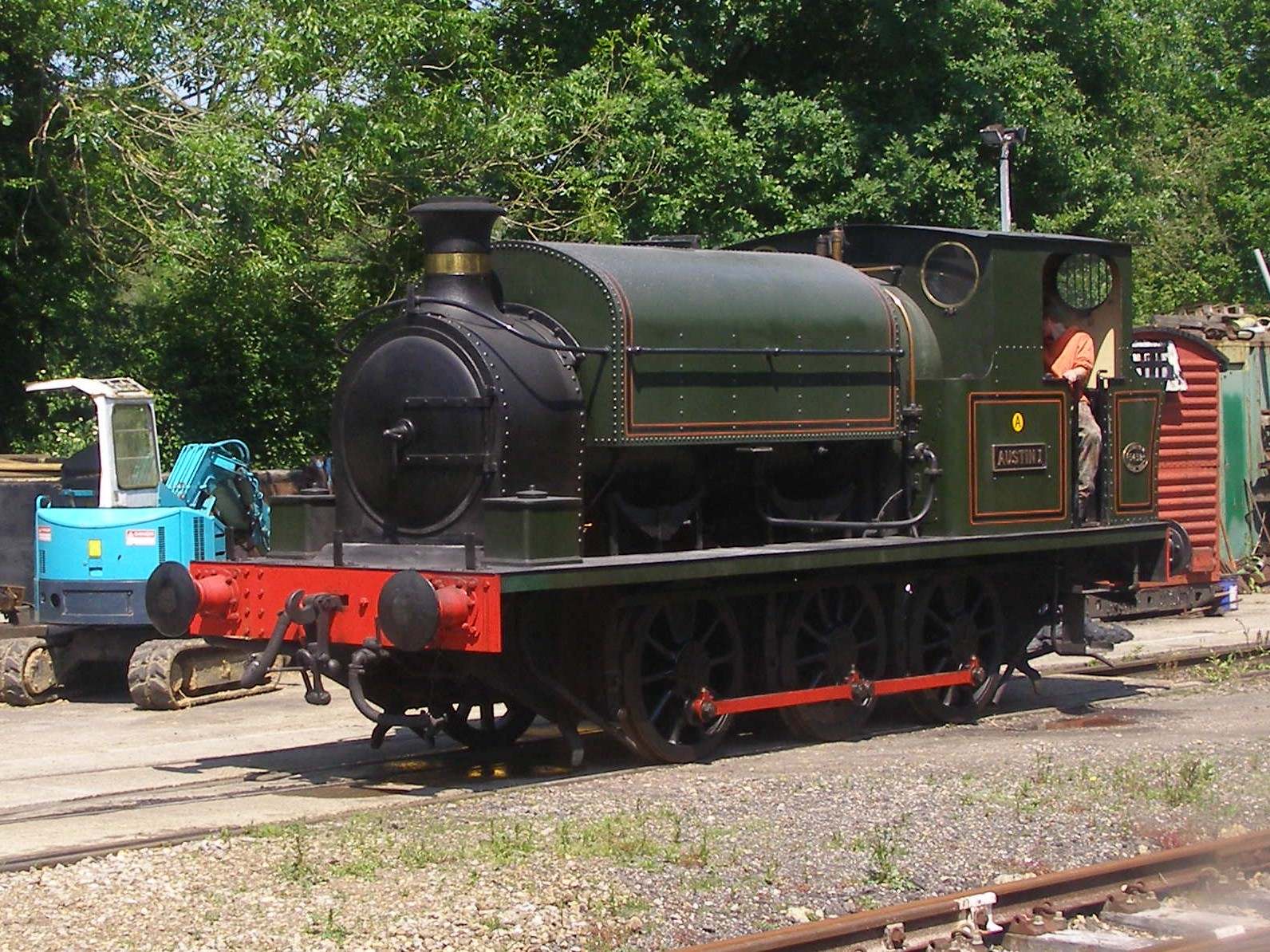
Kitson 0-6-0ST "Austin I" built in 1932 on shed at Isfield

== Stations ==
=== Isfield ===
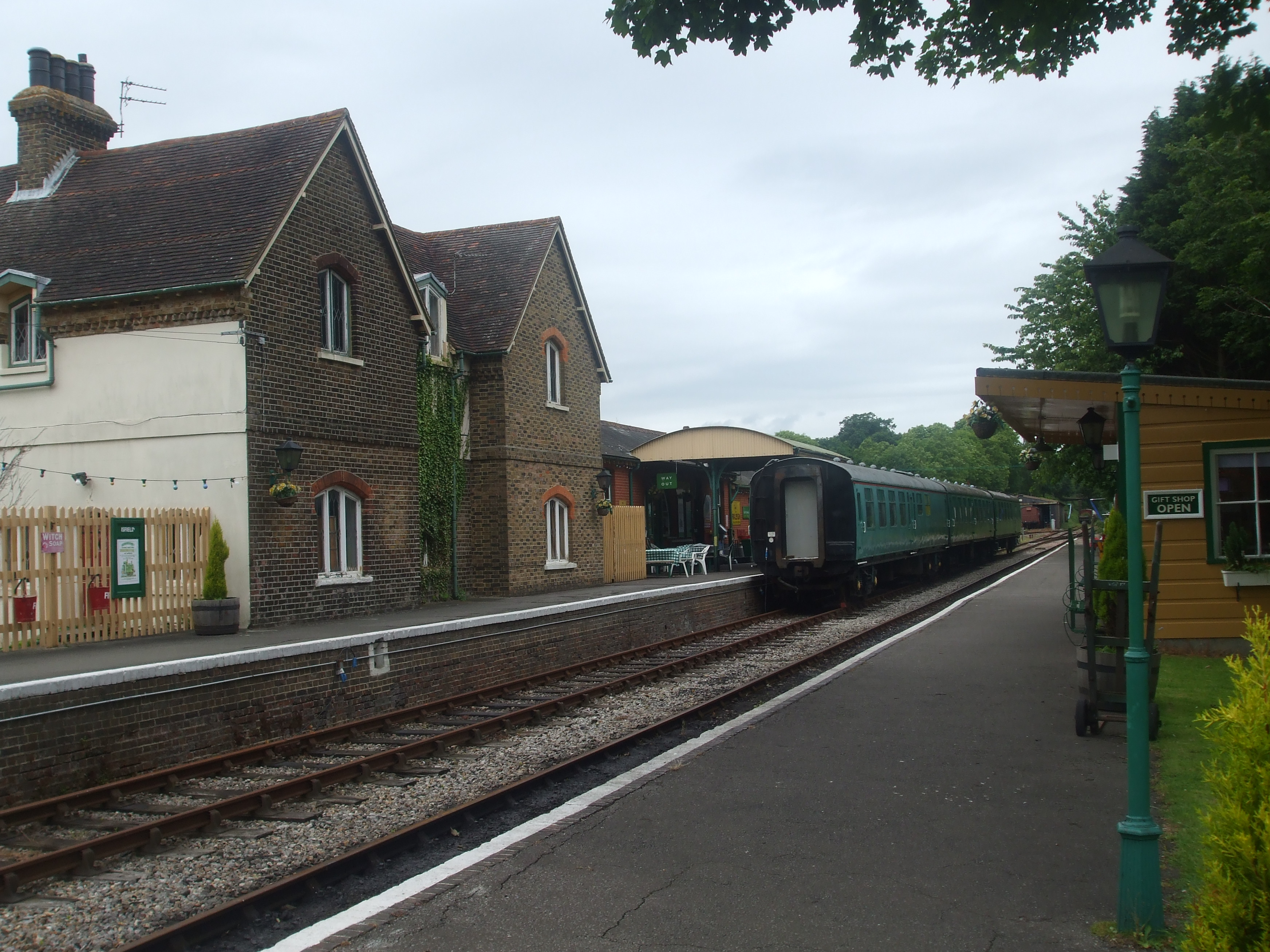
Isfield station.

Isfield station remains the headquarters, operating base, and engineering base of the Lavender Line. Since its restoration in the 1980s the station has been a popular attraction for the local area, and remains a well-celebrated example of a restored period railway station. The station has won awards for its restoration, and proved popular as a location for film and television shoots requiring a period railway station. The original buildings all survive except for the down side platform shelter replaced by a replica used as a shop, though considerable changes have been made to the up side buildings to convert the original booking office, waiting room and lady's toilet to a cafe. The station house has been sympathetically extended but is not part of the Lavender Line and remains occupied as a private dwelling. The signal box is now Grade II listed and does not operate the station.

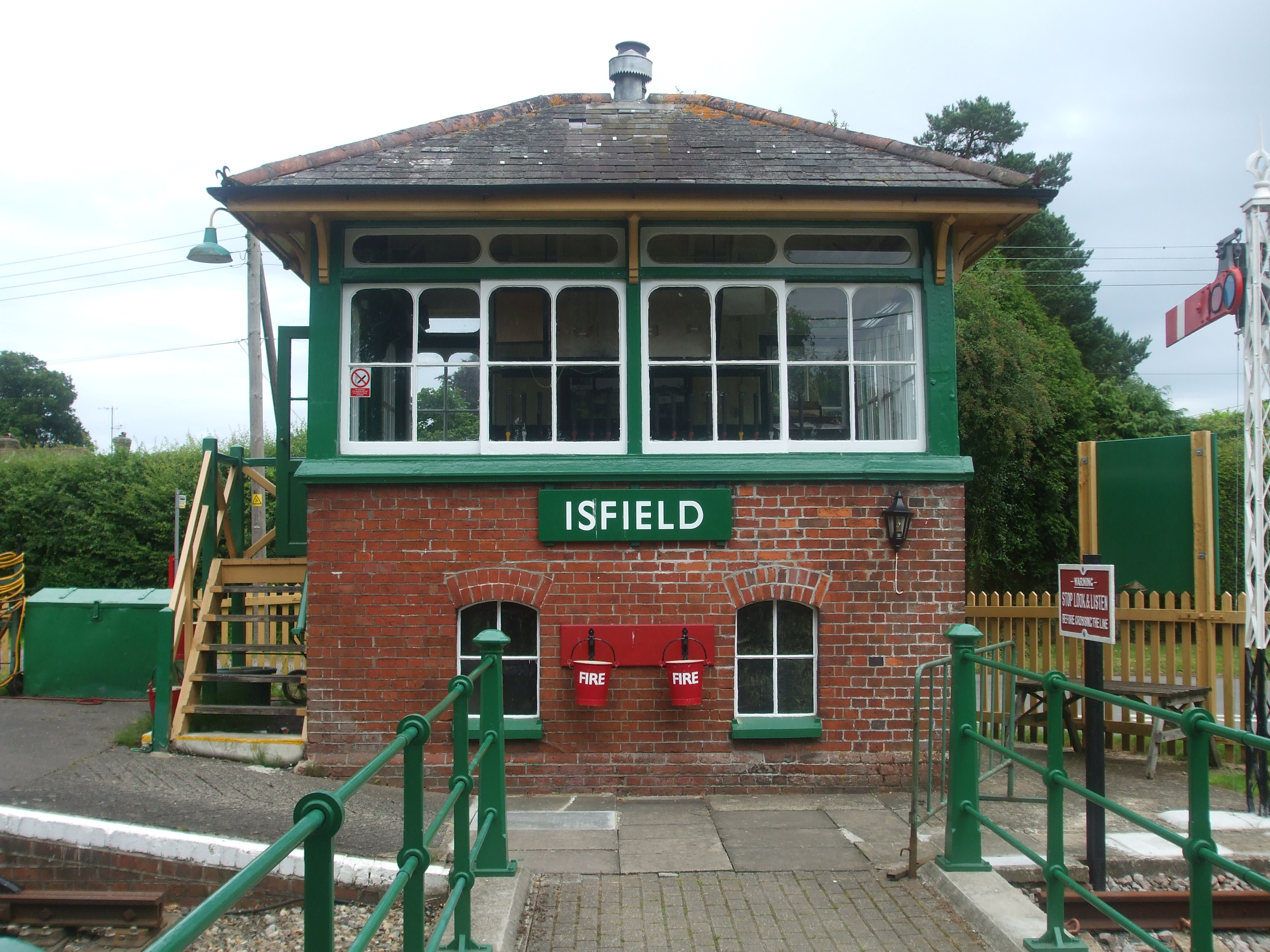
Isfield signal box.

=== Worth Halt ===
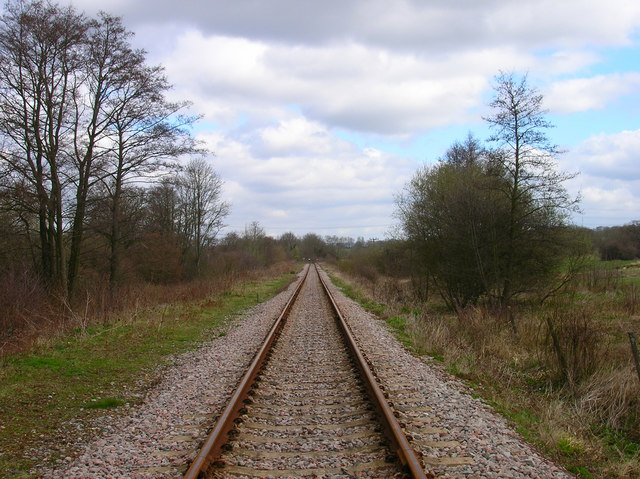
The end of the line at Little Horsted before construction of Worth Halt.

Work started in December 2011 on building a halt style platform at the Uck river bridge, together with a picnic area. It was opened on the Saturday of the first Diesel Gala in July 2012, and named Worth Halt after the parish in which it lies. The construction of the halt allows passengers to travel between two permanent stations, whilst the line remains limited to its current 1 mile (1.6 km) length.

== Future expansion ==
Despite attempts by the Wealden Line Campaign to have the line from Uckfield through Isfield to Lewes reopened to passenger traffic, a July 2008 study concluded that although technically feasible, the line would be "economically unviable". Any reopening might affect the operations of the Lavender Line or entail a move to a new location, but this depends on the details of any final scheme adopted. In any event, the campaign has not succeeded, an application to the "restoring your railway" fund in 2021 having failed.

The Preservation Society has expressed an interest in restoring and reopening the line between Uckfield and Lewes in the long-term future. In December 2008, following the rejection of the reopening proposal, a petition was presented to East Sussex County Council asking it to acquire the trackbed from the Lavender Line's northern boundary to the former site of Uckfield station (which had been relocated further north in the meantime), to lease back the section and to allow heritage services to be run over it. In April 2009, the council's Director of Transport and Environment recommended that the petition be refused on the basis that a heritage operation would prejudice the reopening of the line and the costs entailed would divert funding away from core Council services. Most of the old station site in Uckfield is now a carpark, but one platform remains.

Extension to the south is difficult due to the need to reopen the level crossing on Station Road (against ORR policy) while extension to the north would require the two bridges over the river Uck to be refurbished and would only be able to reach Uckfield bypass which blocks access to the station site in Uckfield. Any reinstatement as part of Network Rail would require a new, elevated, station in Uckfield to allow the bypass to be bridged.

== Current Rolling Stock ==
Stock as at October 2026

=== Diesel locomotives ===
Name	Class	Number	Builder	Works No	Type	Year built	Owner	Status
	British Rail Class 73/1	73140	English Electric (Vulcan Foundry)		Bo Bo	1966	Privately Owned	Operational
–		Army 221	Andrew Barclay	354	0-4-0DM	1941	Privately Owned	Operational
–		Army 830	Vulcan / Drewry	VF 5257 / DC 2176	0-4-0DM	1945	Privately Owned	Stored
Planet		15	Hibberd	3658	4wDM	1953	Lavender Line Preservation Society	Operational
–	British Rail Class 09	09 025 / D4113	BR Horwich	–	0-6-0DE	1962	Lavender Line Preservation Society	Operational

=== Diesel-mechanical multiple units ===
Class	Number	Builder	Type	Year built	Owner	Status	Notes
British Rail 101 DMU	56408	Metro Cammell	DTSL	1958	Lavender Line Preservation Society	Serviceable	Used as loco-hauled carriage (Built as a DTCL but has all second class seats).

=== Diesel-electric multiple units ===
All are of BR Class 205.

Unit No.	DMBSO	DTCsoL	Year built	Owner	Status	Notes
1121	–	60820	1958	Hastings Diesels Ltd.	Operational	DMBSO not preserved.
1123	60122	–	1958	Hampshire & Sussex Units Preservation Society	Used as an office	Trailer vehicles at Swindon and Cricklade Railway.
1133	60151	60832	1962	Lavender Line Preservation Society	Operational	DTCsoL stored. TSO originally preserved but later sold now a farmers hay barn.

=== Electric multiple units ===
Class	Unit No.	DTCsoL	MBSO	TSO	DTCsoL	Type	Year built	Owner	Status
British Rail Class 421	1497	76764	62402	-	76835	3CIG EMU	1970	Privately Owned	Under restoration

=== Carriages ===
Origin	Number	Type	Ownership	Status	Notes
BR	21273	MK.I Brake Corridor Composite	Lavender Line Ltd	In service	Much modified former generator coach
BR	69333	Class 422 Buffet Car	Private	Stored	
