= Cowden rail crash =

1994 collision in Kent, England

Coordinates: 51°9′9″N 0°6′50″E

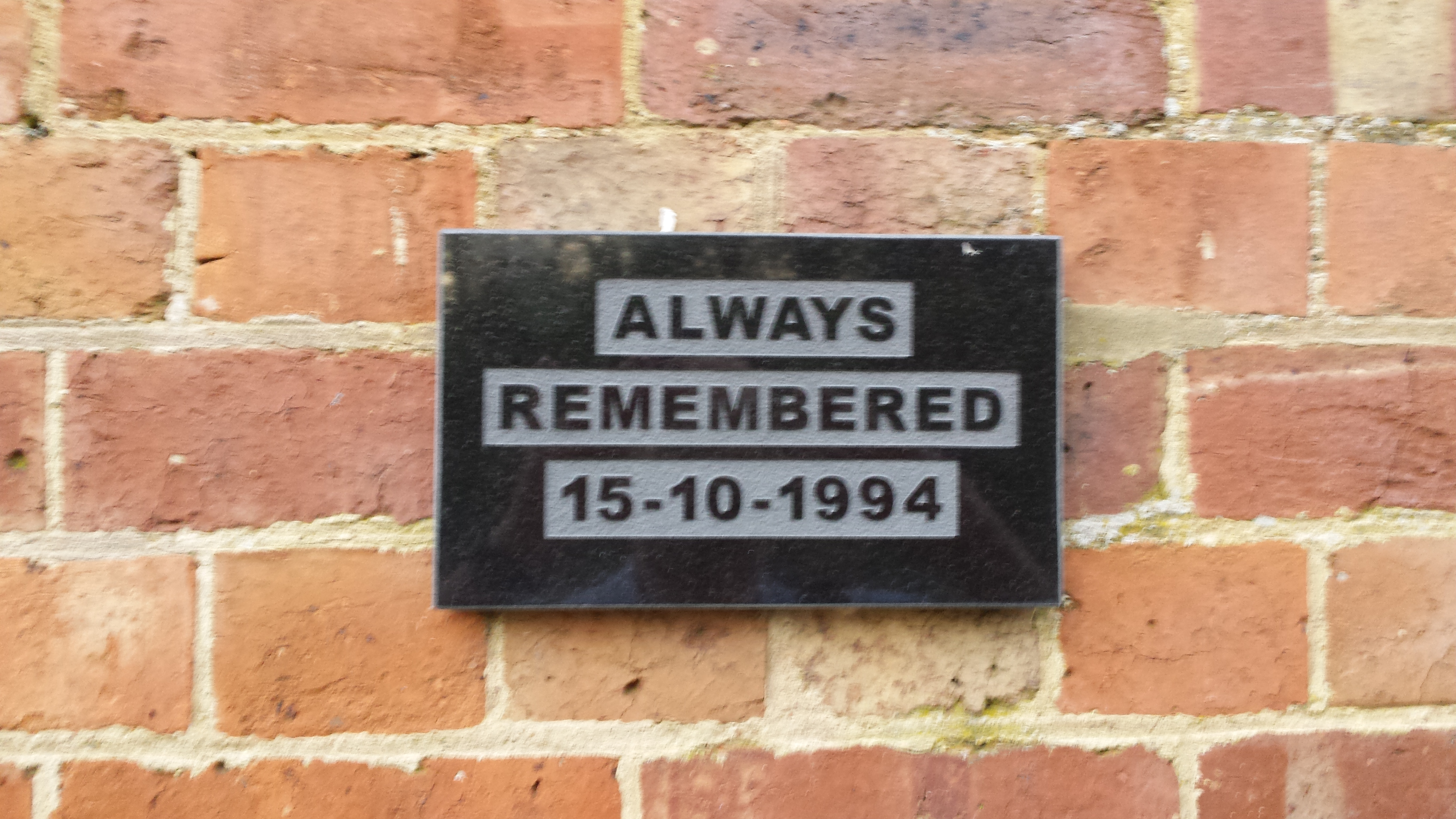
- Plaque at Cowden station

Details
- Date: 15 October 1994
- Location: Cowden railway station, Kent
- Country: England
- Line: Oxted Line
- Operator: Network SouthCentral
- Incident type: Single-line collision
- Cause: SPAD caused by driver error

Statistics
- Trains: 2
- Deaths: 5
- Injured: 13

The Cowden rail crash occurred on 15 October 1994, near Cowden Station in Kent (UK), when two trains collided head-on, killing five and injuring 13, after one of them had passed a signal at danger and entered a single-line section. The principal cause was driver error. Possible contributory factors were; the signal was dirty and the light intensity was low, a guard who was in the cab against regulations potentially distracting the driver, lack of in-cab radio, patchy mist and fog, and there were no trap points to prevent a train wrongly entering a section against the signal.

== Crash ==
The 08:00 up Uckfield-Oxted DEMU train, 2E27 consisting of Class 205 three-car units 205018 and 205001, was crewed by driver Brian Barton and guard Jonathan Brett-Andrews.

2E27 departed from Ashurst at about 08:25 and wrongly entered a single-track section of line, which ran from Ashurst to Hever station. The entry signal was held at danger for 2E27 to await the passage of the 08:04 Oxted-Uckfield DEMU down train 2E24, consisting of Class 205 three-car units 205029 and 205032, crewed by driver David Rees and guard R. Boyd. Because it was not possible to communicate with the train crews (e.g. by radio), the Oxted signalman was unable to prevent the ensuing collision, which occurred shortly after 2E24 had departed from Cowden station in the single-line section.

The lead car of 2E27 was telescoped by the lead car of 2E24. Both drivers, along with guard Brett-Andrews and two passengers, Raymond and Maura Pointer, were killed. The guard was in the driving cab of 2E27, contrary to regulations, and had previously received three separate reprimands for this. The cabs were so badly damaged that it was impossible to determine who had been driving 2E27.

== Causes ==
The official accident report placed the main responsibility on the driver of the northbound train, Brian Barton. There were several contributory factors; the signal was dirty and the light intensity was low, there was patchy morning mist and fog (though clearing rapidly) and there were no trap points to prevent a train wrongly entering a section against the signal.

It was noted that the Oxted signalman, who was aware of the situation, had no direct means of alerting either driver. The signalman did alert the emergency services to the collision while the trains were still one mile apart. The reason for cancelling the contract to fit Cab Secure Radio to this line prior to the incident, as mandated in the wake of the previous Clapham disaster and Hidden report recommendations, remains unclear; however it seems likely that the changes occurring at the time, such as the Channel Tunnel and privatisation of the rail network, took priority over funding. Radio began to be installed across the railway immediately following the incident, and an inquiry was started.

The crash was exacerbated by the age and design of the multiple units involved. The separate-chassis construction of the elderly British Rail Class 205 stock, based on the BR Mk1 design, led to overriding of one carriage by the next. The weight of the diesel engines above the frames of the coach probably did not help. These trains, unpopular with users of the line because of their age, were replaced in 2004 by Turbostars.

The Wealden Line Campaign, which lobbies for service improvements and extensions to the Uckfield line, had previously predicted in its newsletter Missing Link and via the local press that the line's rationalisation - the reduction to single line sections - could lead to such an event. They continue to campaign for the re-doubling of the route and its development within their BML2 project.

A plaque on the station buildings at Cowden commemorates the crash.

== Legacy ==
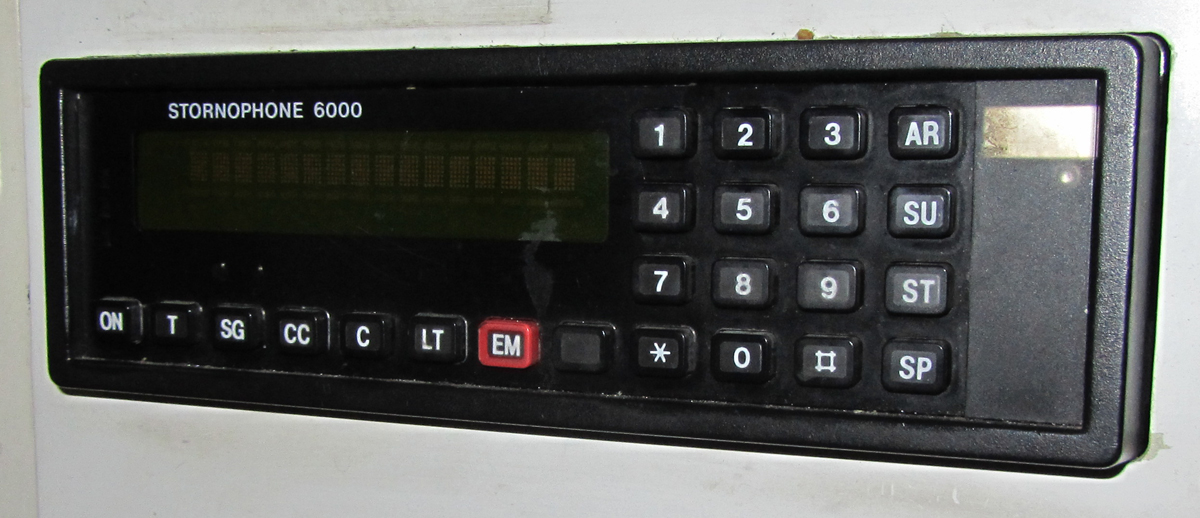
Although it has now been superseded by GSM-R, Cab Secure Radio was introduced following the Cowden crash

- Cab Secure Radio began to be introduced
- SPAD indicators were introduced to protect the entrance to single lines
- AWS magnets were installed at the exits to some maintenance depots to check that a train's automatic warning system is operational.
- Eventually the train protection and warning system was installed at the entrance to single lines and other conflict points.

== Sources ==
- Hall, Stanley (1999). Hidden Dangers: Railway Safety in the Era of Privatisation. Ian Allan. ISBN 0-7137-1973-7.
- Holden, C. B. (January 1996). "A report of the Inquiry into the collision between two passenger trains which occurred at Cowden on 15 October 1994" (PDF). Health and Safety Executive.
- Vaughan, Adrian (2000). Tracks to Disaster. Ian Allan. ISBN 0-7110-2731-5.
