= Buxted railway station =

Railway station in East Sussex, England

Buxted
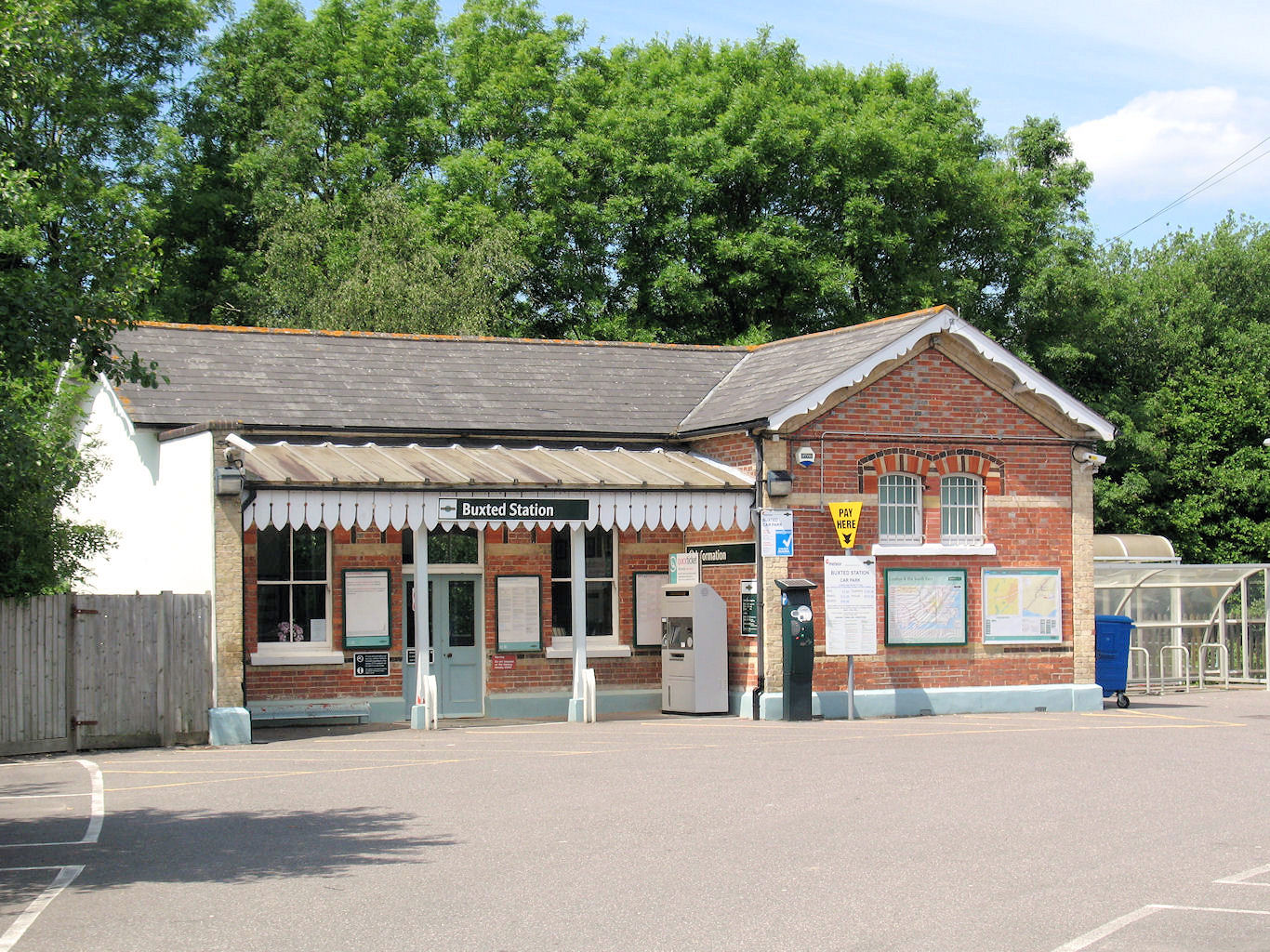

General information
- Location: Buxted, Wealden; England
- Coordinates: 50.990°N 0.131°E
- Grid reference: TQ494233
- Managed by: Southern
- Platforms: 1 (originally 2)

Other information
- Station code: BXD
- Classification: DfT category E

History
- Original company: London, Brighton and South Coast Railway
- Pre-grouping: London, Brighton and South Coast Railway
- Post-grouping: Southern Railway

Key dates
- 3 August 1868: Opened

Passengers
- 2020/21: ▼21,704
- 2021/22: ▲68,978
- 2022/23: ▲92,856
- 2023/24: ▲95,564
- 2024/25: ▲99,310
Location
Notes
- Passenger statistics from the Office of Rail and Road

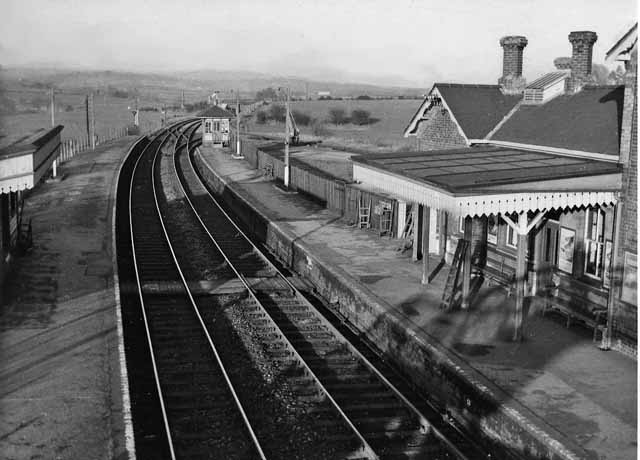
View northwards, towards Eridge, in 1960

Buxted railway station is on the Uckfield branch of the Oxted Line in England, serving the village of Buxted, East Sussex. It is 43 miles 68 chains (70.6 km) from London Bridge .

The station and all trains that call are operated by Southern.

The line used to continue to Lewes and Brighton until 1969.

== History ==
The station was opened by the Brighton, Uckfield and Tunbridge Wells Railway on 3 August 1868. It became part of London, Brighton and South Coast Railway in 1859.

In 1990 the line between Crowborough and Uckfield was reduced from two tracks to one, the second platform is still visible and in situe however it is highly overgrown.

== Facilities ==
The station has a ticket office which is staffed during Monday-Saturday mornings (Mon-Fri 05:55-12:30, Sat 06:30-13:05). At other times, the station is unstaffed and tickets can be purchased from the self-service ticket machine at the station.

The station has passenger help points and covered seating areas available on its platform. There are also toilets at the station. The station has a paid car park and taxis can pickup from its main entrance. There is also a small cycle rack at the entrance to the station.

Step free access is available to the platform at Buxted.

== Services ==
All services at Buxted are operated by Southern using Class 171 DMUs.

The typical off-peak service in trains per hour is:

- 1 tph to London Bridge via Oxted
- 1 tph to Uckfield

Services increase to 2 tph in each direction during the peak hours.

On Sundays, the northbound service runs as far as Oxted only.

Preceding station	National Rail	Following station
Crowborough	Southern Oxted Line Uckfield Branch	Uckfield
