= Crowborough railway station =

Railway station in East Sussex, England

Crowborough
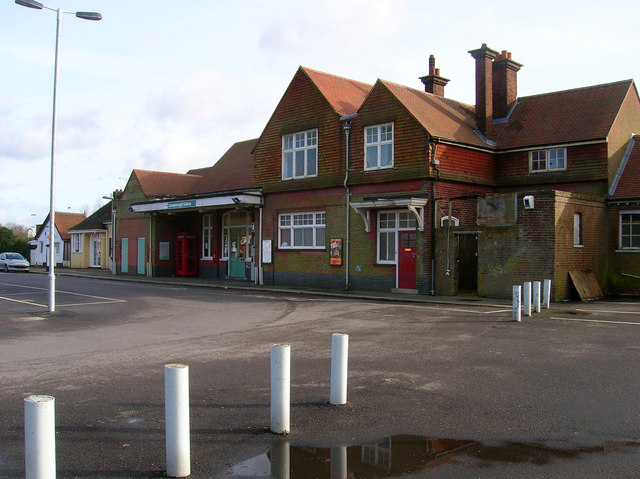

General information
- Location: Crowborough, Wealden; England
- Coordinates: 51.046°N 0.188°E
- Grid reference: TQ534297
- Managed by: Southern
- Platforms: 2

Other information
- Station code: COH
- Classification: DfT category E

History
- Original company: Brighton, Uckfield and Tunbridge Wells Railway
- Pre-grouping: London, Brighton and South Coast Railway
- Post-grouping: Southern Railway

Key dates
- 3 August 1868: Opened as Rotherfield
- 1 August 1880: Renamed Crowborough
- 1 May 1897: Renamed Crowborough & Jarvis Brook
- 12 May 1980: Renamed Crowborough

Passengers
- 2020/21: ▼56,362
- 2021/22: ▲0.166 million
- 2022/23: ▲0.227 million
- 2023/24: ▲0.234 million
- 2024/25: ▲0.255 million
Location
Notes
- Passenger statistics from the Office of Rail and Road

Crowborough railway station is on the Uckfield branch of the Oxted Line in England, serving the town of Crowborough, East Sussex. It is 39 miles 11 chains (63.0 km) from London Bridge.

The station and all trains that call are operated by Southern.

== History ==
The station was opened by the Brighton, Uckfield and Tunbridge Wells Railway on 3 August 1868 and was originally named Rotherfield. It was renamed several times: to Crowborough on 1 August 1880; to Crowborough & Jarvis Brook on 1 May 1897; before resuming the name Crowborough from 12 May 1980.

The station was also used to transport goods from the nearby brickyard and the old platform still remains but is disused. The old track still exists around the goods yard, however, like the platform, these are overgrown and disused. The signal box was sited at the south end of the down platform but was closed in January 1990 when the line was resignalled.

In early 2016, both platforms were extended to allow ten-coach trains to stop.

== Facilities and Connections ==
The station has a ticket office which is staffed during Monday-Saturday mornings. At other times, the station is unstaffed and tickets can be purchased from the self-service ticket machine at the station.

The station has passenger help points and covered seating areas available on both platforms. There are also toilets at the station. The station has a pay and display car park and taxi-rank at its main entrance. There is also a cycle rack on the London bound platform.

Before February 2023, The London bound platform was the only platform that was accessible without steps, making the Uckfield bound platform only reachable by a stepped footbridge. Though in February 2023, a new footbridge was opened (replacing the old one) featuring 2 lift for both ends, making the station now accessible without steps.

The station is served Monday-Saturday by the Compass Travel routes 228/229 bus routes to Tunbridge Wells. The Brighton and Hove Regency route 29 to Brighton and Lewes also stops nearby in Crowborough Town Centre.

== Services ==
All services at Crowborough are operated by Southern using Class 171 DMUs.

The typical off-peak service in trains per hour is:

- 1 tph to London Bridge via Oxted
- 1 tph to Uckfield

Services increase to 2 tph in each direction during the peak hours.

On Sundays, the northbound service runs as far as Oxted only.

Preceding station	National Rail	Following station
Eridge	Southern Oxted Line Uckfield Branch	Buxted
