= Cowden railway station =

Railway station in Kent, England

Coordinates: 51.156°N 0.110°E

Cowden
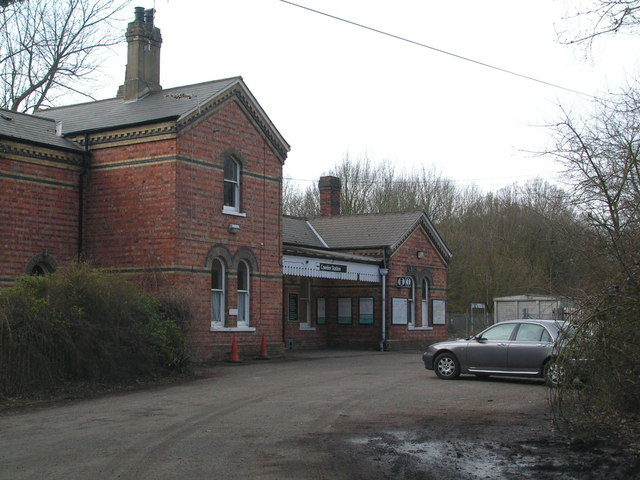

General information
- Location: Cowden, District of Sevenoaks; England
- Grid reference: TQ476417
- Manager: Southern
- Platforms: 1

Other information
- Station code: CWN
- Classification: DfT category F2

History
- Opened: 1 October 1888

Passengers
- 2021/22: ▲30,608
- 2022/23: ▲41,112
- 2023/24: ▼40,504
- 2024/25: ▲48,136
- 2025/26: ▲53,998
Location
Notes
- Passenger statistics from the Office of Rail and Road

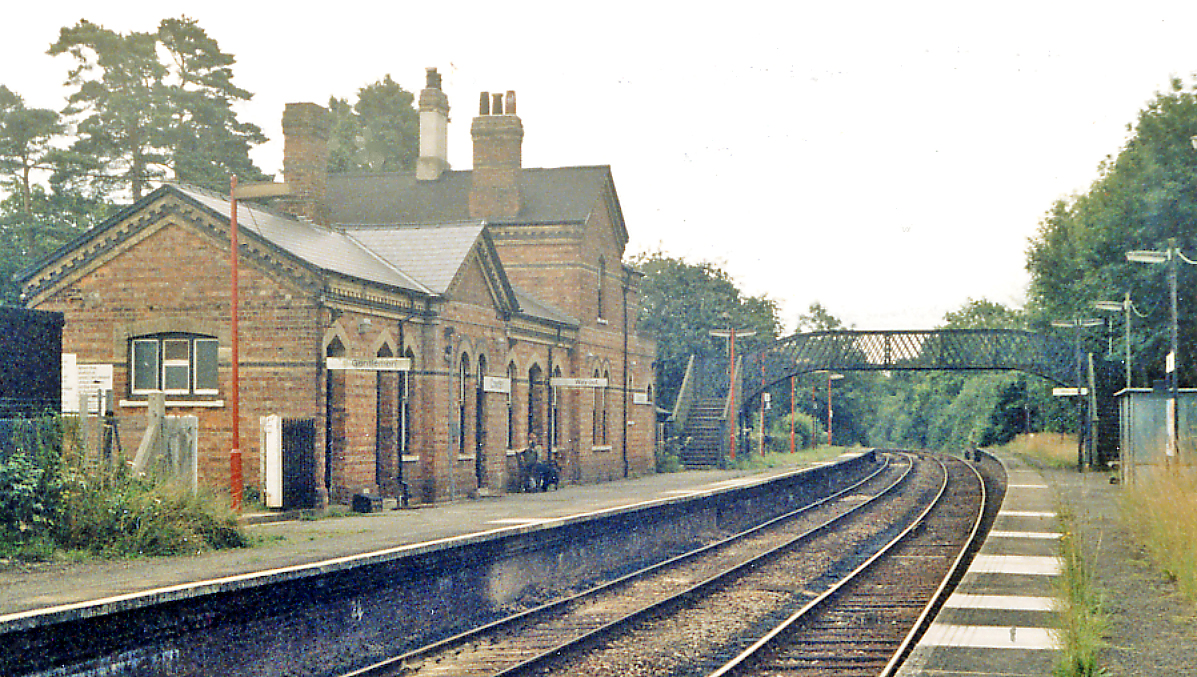
Platform view (1987)

Cowden railway station is on the Uckfield branch of the Oxted line in southern England and serves Cowden in Kent. It is 29 miles 26 chains (29.33 miles, 47.19 km) from London Bridge. The station is managed by Southern.

== History ==
The station was opened by the London, Brighton and South Coast Railway on 1 October 1888. It passed onto the Southern Railway in 1923 and to British Railways in 1948.

The station was destaffed in the 1990s. When the line was singled in 1990 the "up" platform was taken out of use and all trains now use the former "down" platform. The track is not electrified, so only diesel or steam trains can run.

In 1994 a serious accident occurred just south of the station.

== Facilities ==
Cowden station is unstaffed and tickets must be bought from the self-service ticket machine at the station.

The station has passenger help points and covered seating areas available on its platform. The station also has a small car park and cycle rack at the station entrance.

Step free access is available to the platform at Cowden.

== Services ==
All services at Cowden are operated by Southern using Class 171 DMUs.

The typical off-peak service in trains per hour is:

- 1 tph to London Bridge via Oxted
- 1 tph to Uckfield

Services increase to 2 tph in each direction during the peak hours.

On Sundays, the northbound service runs as far as Oxted only.

Preceding station	National Rail	Following station
Hever	Southern Oxted Line Uckfield Branch	Ashurst
