= Edenbridge Town railway station =

Railway station in Kent, England

Coordinates: 51.200°N 0.067°E

Edenbridge Town
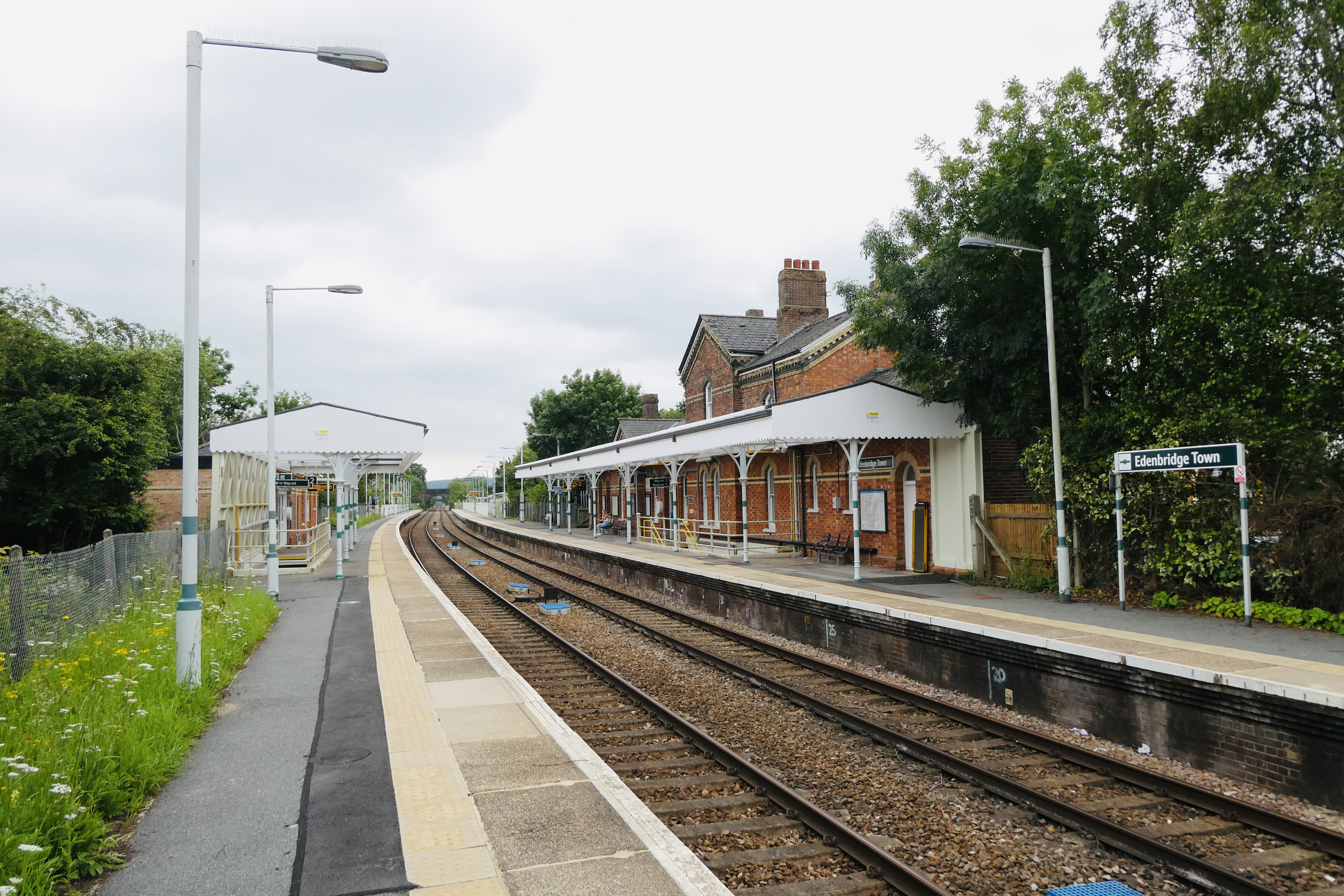
- The platforms at Edenbridge Town, looking southeast

General information
- Location: Edenbridge, District of Sevenoaks; England
- Grid reference: TQ445465
- Manager: Southern
- Platforms: 2

Other information
- Station code: EBT
- Classification: DfT category E

History
- Opened: 2 January 1888

Passengers
- 2020/21: ▼0.126 million
- Interchange: ▼1,979
- 2021/22: ▲0.247 million
- Interchange: ▲6,438
- 2022/23: ▲0.281 million
- Interchange: ▲8,188
- 2023/24: ▲0.292 million
- Interchange: ▲8,795
- 2024/25: ▲0.322 million
- Interchange: ▼6,724
Location
Notes
- Passenger statistics from the Office of Rail and Road

Edenbridge Town railway station is one of two stations serving Edenbridge in Kent, England. The station, and all trains serving it, are operated by Southern, and it is on the Uckfield branch of the Oxted line, 25 miles 47 chains (25.59 miles, 41.18 km) from London Bridge.

== Facilities ==
The station has a ticket office which is staffed during Monday-Saturday mornings (06:30-13:05 Mon-Fri, 07:00-13:30 Sat). At other times, the station is unstaffed and tickets can be purchased from the self-service ticket machine at the station.

The station has passenger help points and covered seating areas available on both platforms which are linked by a subway. There are also toilets at the station which are open when the station is staffed. The station has a free car park (operated by Saba Parking) and a taxi-rank at its main entrance. There is also a cycle rack at the station entrance.

The London-bound platform is accessible without steps, but the Uckfield-bound platform can be reached only by the stepped subway, so it is not accessible.

== Services ==
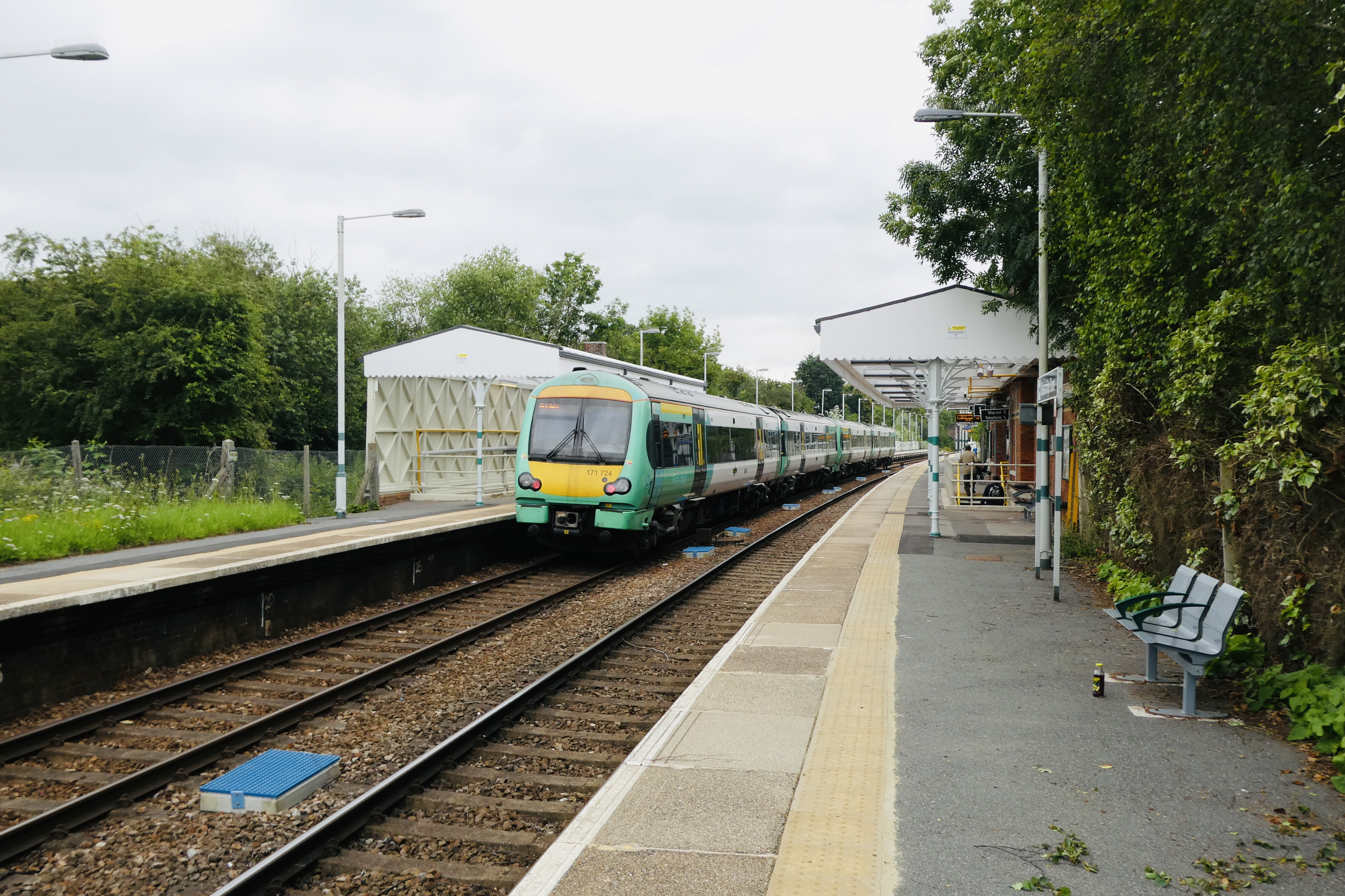
171723 and 171724 at Edenbridge Town with a Southern service to Uckfield

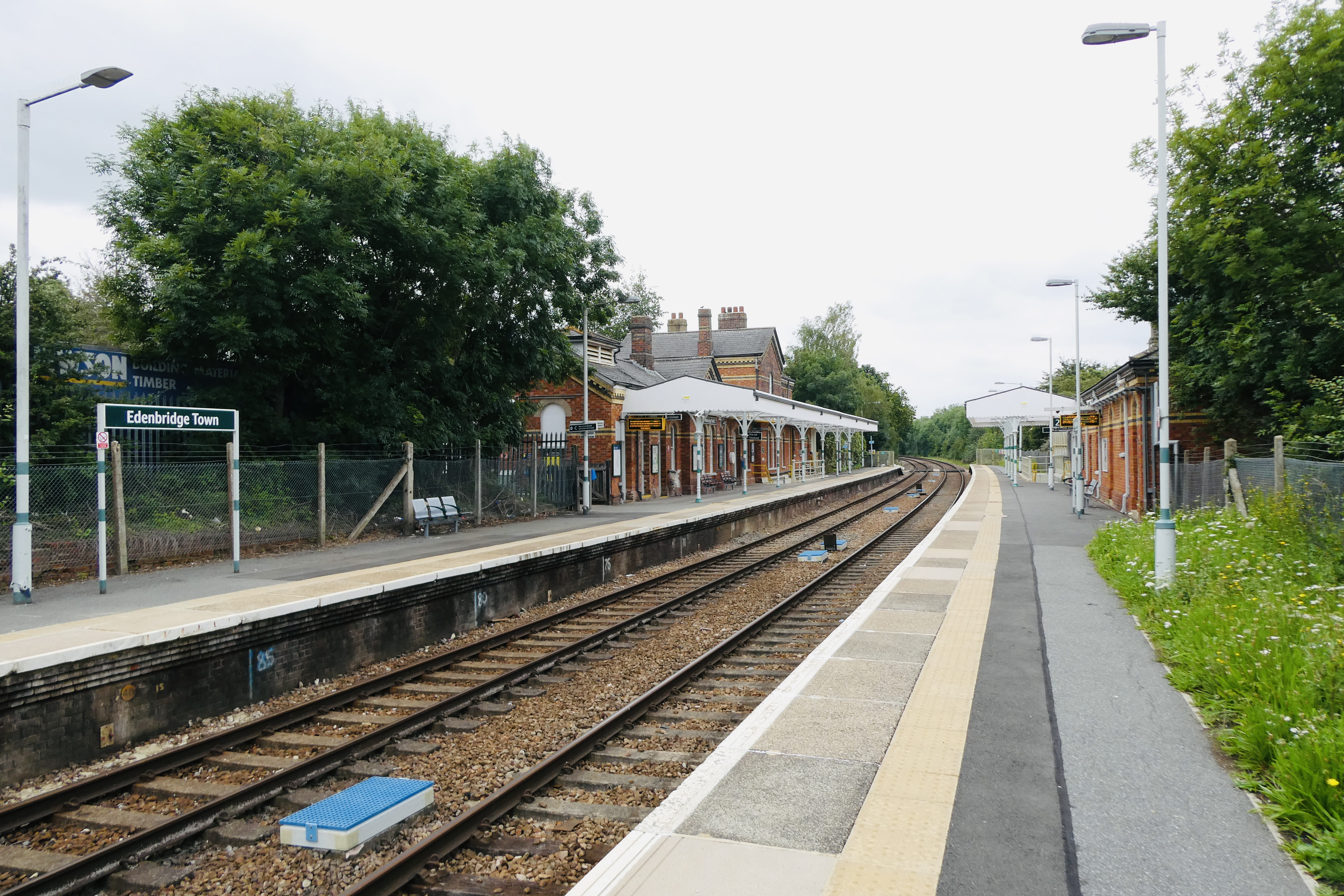
The platforms, looking northwest

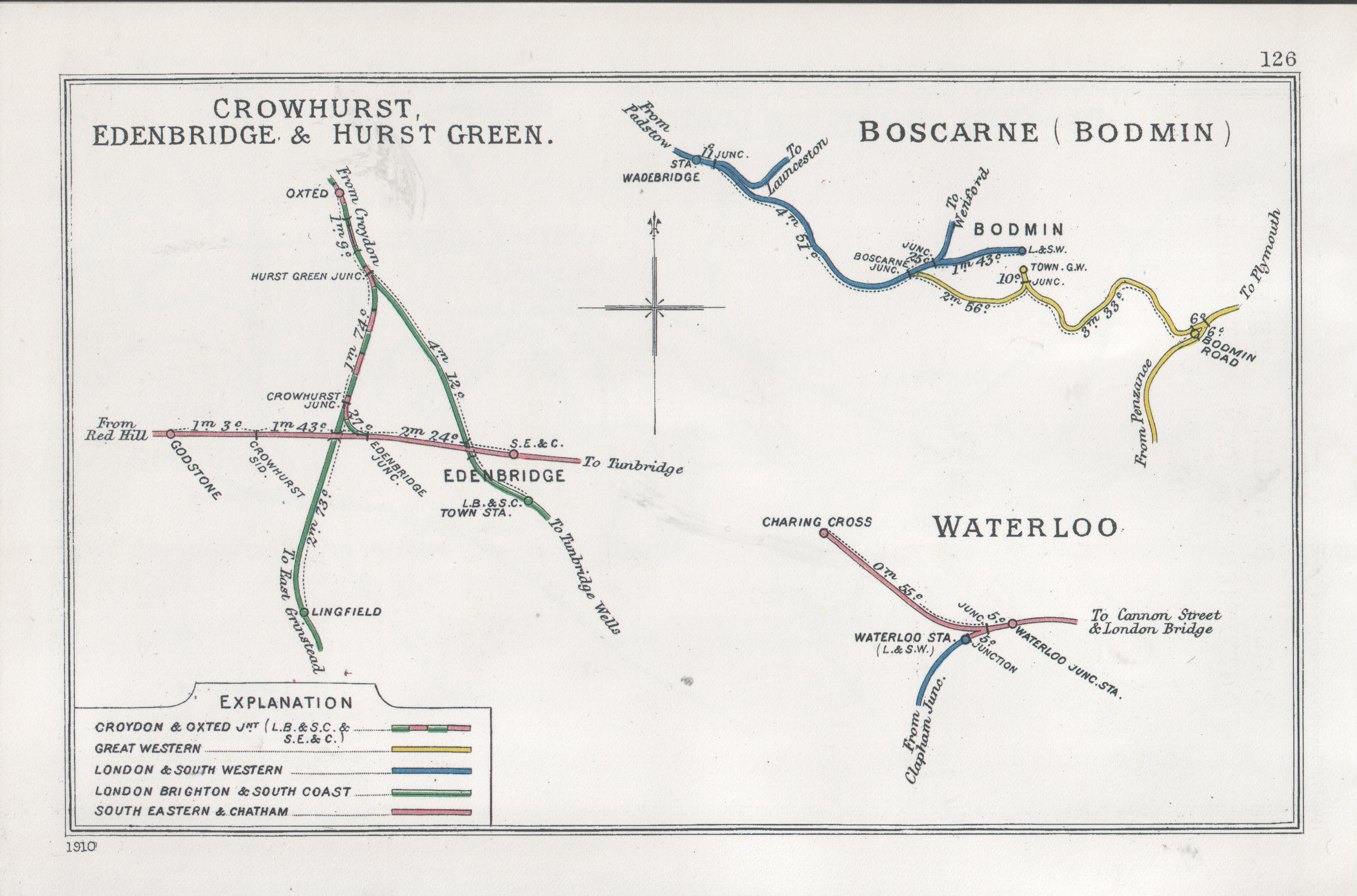
A 1910 Railway Clearing House map of lines around Edenbridge Town railway station.

All services at Edenbridge Town are operated by Southern using Class 171 DMUs.

The typical off-peak service in trains per hour is:

- 1 tph to London Bridge via Oxted
- 1 tph to Uckfield

Services increase to 2 tph in each direction during the peak hours.

On Sundays, the northbound service runs as far as Oxted only.

Preceding station	National Rail	Following station
Hurst Green	Southern Oxted Line Uckfield Branch	Hever

== Connections ==
Metrobus routes 231, 233 and 236 serve the station providing connections to Oxted, East Grinstead and Tunbridge Wells.

== See also ==
- Edenbridge railway station, the other station in the town
