= Ashurst railway station =

Railway station in Kent, England

Coordinates: 51.129°N 0.153°E

Ashurst
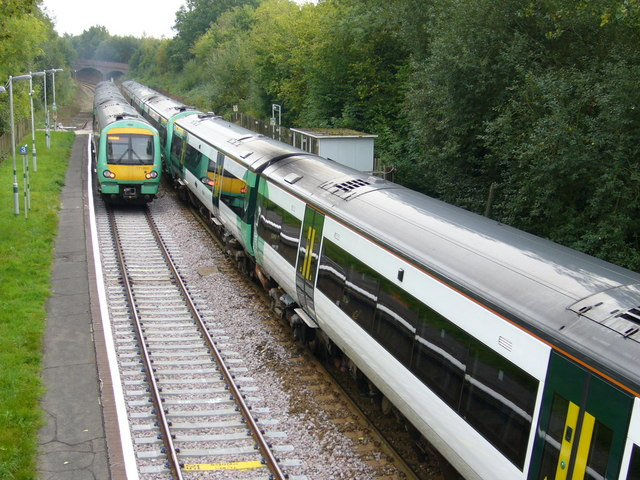

General information
- Location: Ashurst, Kent, Borough of Tunbridge Wells; England
- Grid reference: TQ507387
- Manager: Southern
- Platforms: 2

Other information
- Station code: AHS
- Classification: DfT category F1

History
- Opened: 1 October 1888

Passengers
- 2021/22: ▲18,842
- 2022/23: ▲26,488
- 2023/24: ▲27,422
- 2024/25: ▲27,738
- 2025/26: ▲29,202
Location
Notes
- Passenger statistics from the Office of Rail and Road

Ashurst railway station is on the Uckfield branch of the Oxted line in southern England and serves Ashurst in Kent (very close to the East Sussex border). It is 32 miles 8 chains (32.10 miles, 51.66 km) from London Bridge. The station is managed by Southern.

== History ==
Opened by the London, Brighton and South Coast Railway, it became part of the Southern Railway during the grouping of 1923. The station then passed on to the Southern Region of British Railways on nationalisation in 1948. The station was destaffed around 1970 following which all the station buildings were demolished in 1983.

When sectorisation was introduced in the 1980s, the station was served by Network SouthEast until the privatisation of British Rail.

== Facilities ==
Ashurst station is unstaffed and tickets must be bought from the self-service ticket machine at the station.

The station has passenger help points and covered seating areas available on both platforms. The station also has a small car park and cycle rack at the station entrance.

The Uckfield bound platform is accessible without steps, however the London bound platform is only reachable by the stepped footbridge.

== Services ==
All services at Ashurst are operated by Southern using Class 171 DMUs.

The typical off-peak service in trains per hour is:

- 1 tph to London Bridge via Oxted
- 1 tph to Uckfield

Services increase to 2 tph in each direction during the peak hours.

On Sundays, the northbound service runs as far as Oxted only.

Preceding station	National Rail	Following station
Cowden	Southern Oxted Line Uckfield Branch	Eridge
