= Hever railway station =

Railway station in Kent, England

Coordinates: 51.181°N 0.095°E

Hever
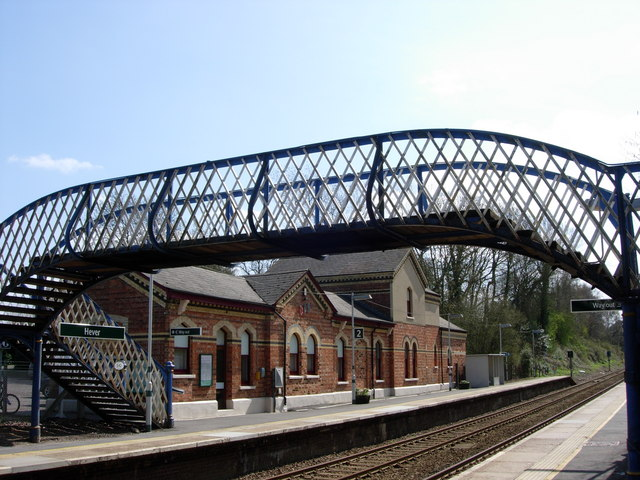

General information
- Location: Hever, District of Sevenoaks; England
- Grid reference: TQ465445
- Manager: Southern
- Platforms: 2

Other information
- Station code: HEV
- Classification: DfT category F2

History
- Opened: 1 October 1888

Passengers
- 2021/22: ▲29,784
- 2022/23: ▲39,202
- 2023/24: ▲40,408
- 2024/25: ▲46,240
- 2025/26: ▲50,234
Location
Notes
- Passenger statistics from the Office of Rail and Road

Hever railway station is on the Uckfield branch of the Oxted line in southern England and serves Hever in Kent. It is 27 miles 27 chains (27.34 miles, 44.00 km) from London Bridge. The station is managed by Southern.

Hever Castle is about a 1 mile (1.6 km) walk from the station.

== History ==
The station was opened by the London, Brighton and South Coast Railway on 1 October 1888. It passed onto the Southern Railway in 1923 and to British Railways in 1948. The signal box was built into the station building and remained in use until the line was resignalled in January 1990 when the station was destaffed.

== Facilities ==
Hever station is unstaffed and tickets must be bought from the self-service ticket machine at the station.

The station has passenger help points and covered seating areas available on both platforms. The station has a small cycle rack located on the Uckfield bound platform.

The Uckfield bound platform is accessible without steps however the London bound platform is only reachable by the stepped footbridge so isn't accessible.

== Services ==
All services at Hever are operated by Southern using Class 171 DMUs.

The typical off-peak service in trains per hour is:

- 1 tph to London Bridge via Oxted
- 1 tph to Uckfield

Services increase to 2 tph in each direction during the peak hours.

On Sundays, the northbound service runs as far as Oxted only.

Preceding station	National Rail	Following station
Edenbridge Town	Southern Oxted Line Uckfield Branch	Cowden
