= Woldingham railway station =

Railway station in Surrey, England

Coordinates: 51.290°N 0.052°W

Woldingham
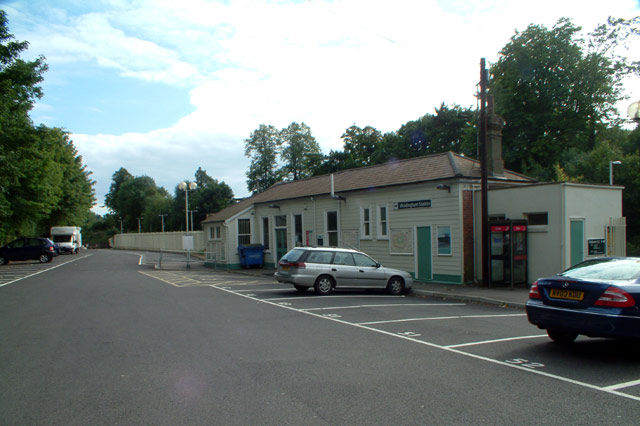

General information
- Location: Woldingham, District of Tandridge; England
- Grid reference: TQ359563
- Managed by: Southern
- Platforms: 2

Other information
- Station code: WOH
- Classification: DfT category E

History
- Opened: 1 July 1885

Passengers
- 2020/21: ▼87,854
- 2021/22: ▲0.223 million
- 2022/23: ▲0.264 million
- 2023/24: ▲0.310 million
- 2024/25: ▲0.349 million
Location
Notes
- Passenger statistics from the Office of Rail and Road

Woldingham railway station is on the Oxted line in the west of the civil parish and village of Woldingham in Surrey, England. It is 17 miles 15 chains (17.19 miles, 27.66 km) from London Bridge, although off peak trains run to and from London Victoria. The station is managed by Southern.

== History ==
The station opened as Marden Park in 1885, one year after the line opened, with one waiting shelter and named after the manor in the west of Woldingham and north-east of Godstone. The line was relatively late in the history of the railways due to the amount of earth-moving and chalk extraction required. The adjacent Station Lodge is at 128 metres (420 ft) above sea level (ordnance datum) and path below the viaduct immediately to the north is at 122 metres (400 ft), as the track ascends the remainder of the cutting and immediately south of the station enters a cutting. A tunnel follows to the south of approximately 1 mile (1.6 km). It was renamed Woldingham in 1894.

The station appears briefly in the 1973 David Jason film White Cargo, at the 27:00 minute mark.

== Facilities ==
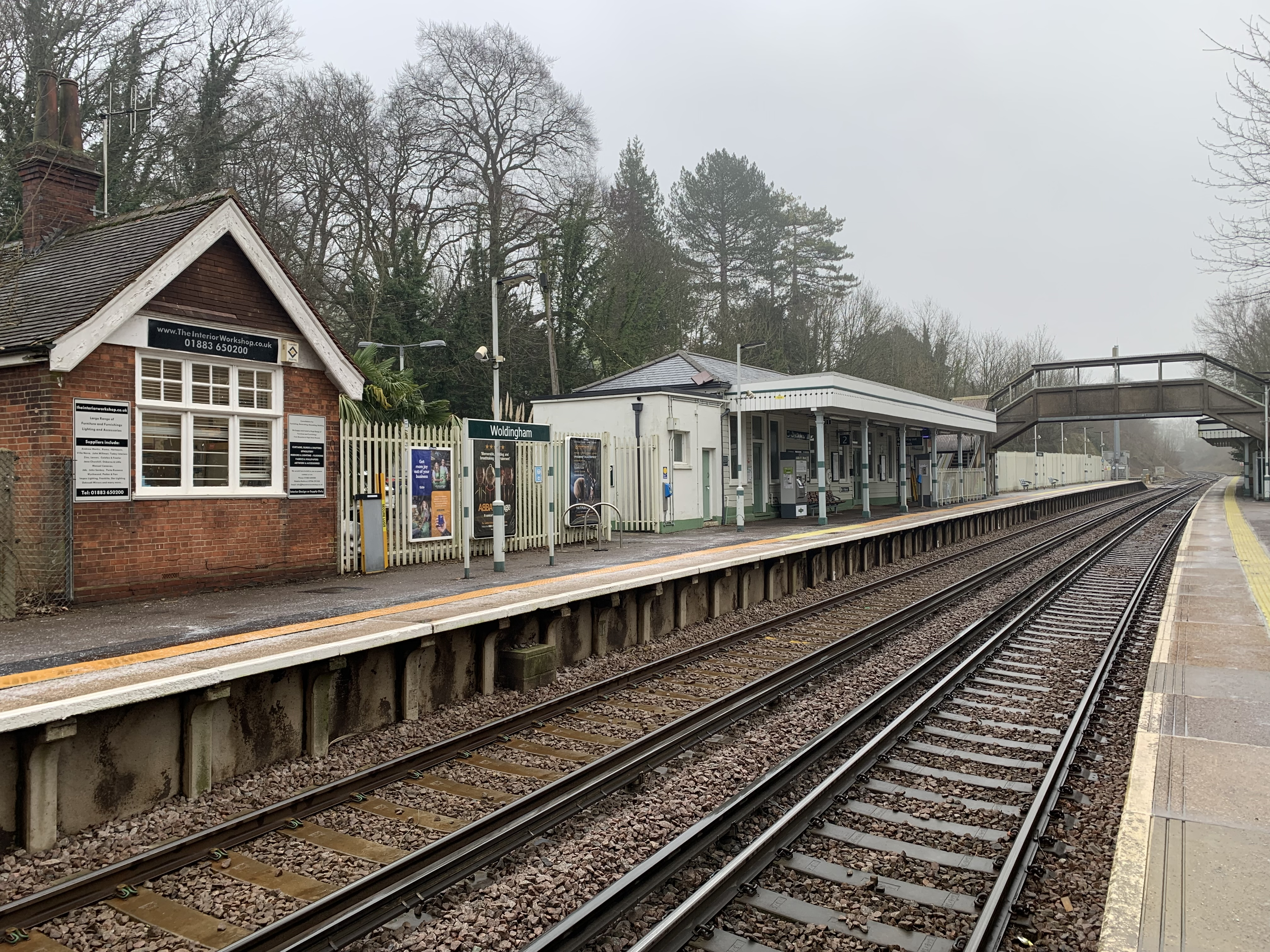
The station platforms, 2023

On the southbound platform, there is a self-service ticket machine and a ticket office which is staffed during weekday and Saturday mornings only. The ticket office also contains a waiting room and toilets which are open when the station is staffed. Both platforms have shelters, information screens and modern help points. The station has a chargeable car park and bicycle storage.

== Services ==
Off-peak, all services at Woldingham are operated by Southern using Class 377 EMUs.

The typical off-peak service in trains per hour is:

- 1 tph to London Victoria
- 1 tph to East Grinstead via Oxted

During the peak hours and on weekends, the service is increased to 2 tph in each direction.

During the peak hours, there are also Thameslink operated services between East Grinstead, London Bridge and Bedford. These services are operated using Class 700 EMUs.

Preceding station	National Rail	Following station
Upper Warlingham	Southern Oxted Line	Oxted
Upper Warlingham	Thameslink Bedford to East Grinstead Peak Hours Only	Oxted
