= Southern (Greater Thameslink Railway) =

British train operating company

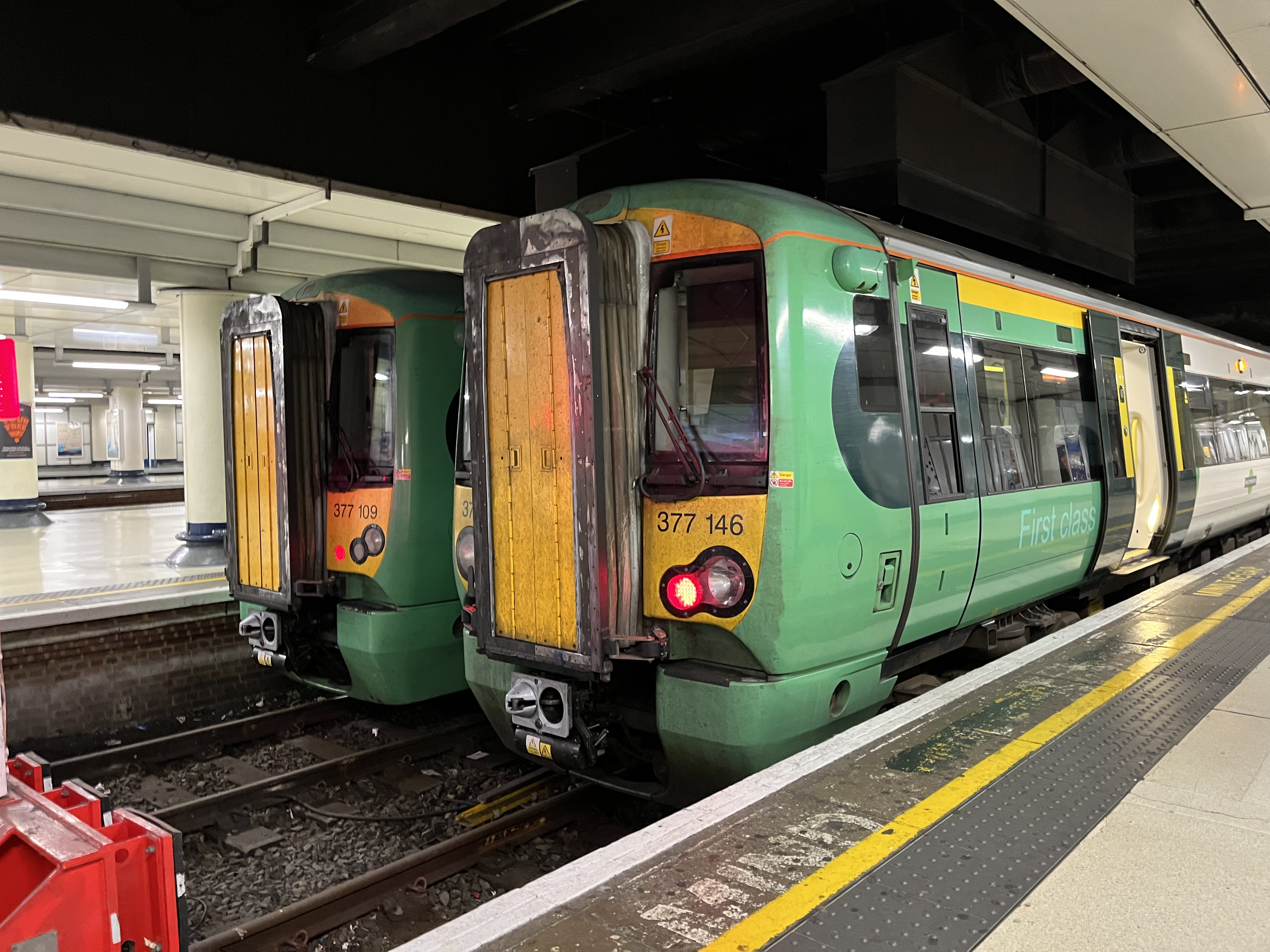
- Southern Class 377 units at London Victoria

Overview
- Franchises: South Central 26 August 2001 – 19 September 2009; Gatwick Express 22 June 2008 – 19 September 2009; South Central (incl Gatwick Express) 20 September 2009 – 25 July 2015; Part of Thameslink, Southern and Great Northern 26 July 2015 – 31 May 2026
- Main Regions: Greater London, South East England
- Other Region: East of England
- Fleet: Class 171 Turbostar; Class 377 Electrostar; Class 387 Electrostar
- Stations called at: 213
- Stations operated: 156
- Parent company: Greater Thameslink Railway
- Reporting mark: SN

Technical
- Track gauge: 1,435 mm (4 ft 8 1/2 in) standard gauge
- Electrification: 750 V DC third rail 25 kV 50 Hz AC OHLE
- Length: 666.3 km (414.0 mi)

Other
- Website: www.southernrailway.com
Route map

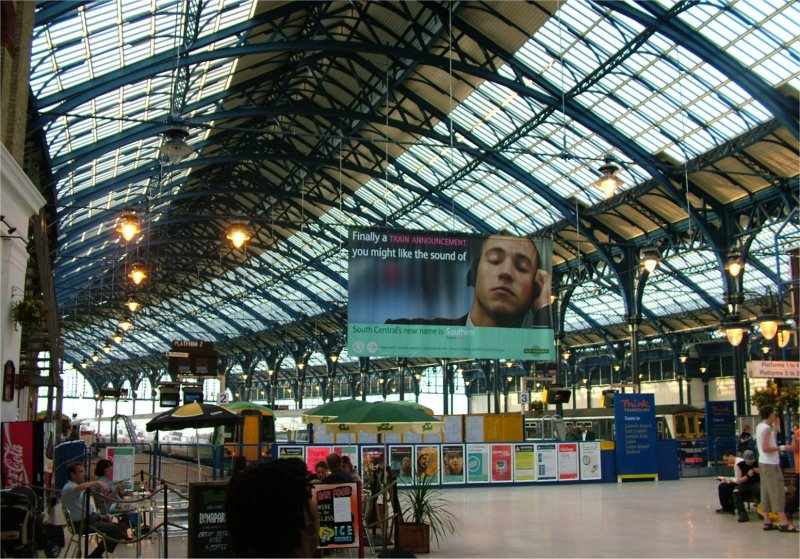
A sign at Brighton station showing the name change from South Central to Southern in August 2004.

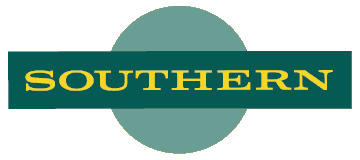
The former logo, used by Southern from 2004 to 2017

Southern, also branded as GBR Southern, are the brand names used on routes in the south of England by Greater Thameslink Railway, a train operating company which has been state-owned since 31 May 2026.

Southern operates the majority of commuter services from its Central London terminals at London Bridge and London Victoria to South London, East and West Sussex, as well as regional services in parts of Hampshire, Kent and Surrey. It also provides services between Watford Junction and Croydon via the West London line.

For three consecutive years from 2016 to 2018, Southern came last on passenger satisfaction in surveys conducted by the consumer group Which?, scoring low for value for money, reliability, and punctuality in 2018. In 2022, Southern was ranked second-worst on overall passenger satisfaction in a survey conducted by Transport Focus.

Passenger services on the Southern route, along with all others operated by Govia Thameslink Railway, transferred to Greater Thameslink Railway on 31 May 2026.

== History ==
As part of the wider privatisation of the state-owned railway operator British Rail in the 1990s, Connex South Central was awarded the Network SouthCentral franchise by the Director of Passenger Rail Franchising. Operations commenced on 26 May 1996.

In March 2000, the Shadow Strategic Rail Authority (SSRA) announced its intention to relet the franchise from May 2003; both Connex and Govia were shortlisted. In October 2000, the SSRA announced that Govia had been awarded the franchise and would operate it from May 2003. Govia negotiated a deal with Connex to buy out the remainder of its franchise, this was completed in August 2001. Govia trading as SouthCentral took over operations on 26 August 2001. The franchise was originally to run for twenty years but, in 2002, the Strategic Rail Authority changed the way it handled financing agreements and therefore Govia was re-awarded with a seven-and-a-half-year franchise until December 2009.

In May 2003, the franchise was rebranded as Southern in a recall of the pre-nationalisation Southern Railway, using a green roundel logo with Southern in yellow in a green bar.

During April 2007, the Department for Transport (DfT) announced that the Gatwick Express franchise was to be incorporated into the main South Central franchise. This reorganisation was part of a wider plan to increase capacity on the Brighton Main Line, involving the extension of peak-hour services from Gatwick to Brighton and Eastbourne from December 2008. This change doubled the number of London to Brighton express trains during those periods.

In December 2008, Southern took over the services on the Redhill to Tonbridge Line from Southeastern.

The South Central franchise end date was brought forward to September 2009 upon the integration of the Gatwick Express service, to allow the new operator to be in place during major changes to the timetable in and around South London in December 2009. In the run-up to the bidding process for the franchise, reports emerged suggesting that Transport for London, the operator of the London Overground service, wished to take control of all overground services in South London, including the 'Metro' area of the South Central franchise. However, such a transfer never took place and the DfT put out the entire franchise for tender.

In August 2008, the DfT shortlisted Govia, National Express, NedRail and Stagecoach for the new South Central franchise. In June 2009, the DfT announced that Govia had retained the franchise, to start on 20 September 2009.

In March 2012, the Department for Transport announced that Abellio, FirstGroup, Govia, MTR and Stagecoach had been shortlisted for the new Thameslink, Southern and Great Northern franchise. The Invitation to Tender was to be issued in October 2012, with the successful bidder announced in spring 2013. However, in the wake of the collapse of the InterCity West Coast refranchising process, the government announced in October 2012 that the process would be put on hold pending the results of a review.

In December 2012, Southern's London Victoria to London Bridge via Denmark Hill service ceased, being partially replaced by London Overground's new Clapham Junction to Dalston Junction service.

At the conclusion of the Southern franchise in July 2015, the South Central franchise was merged into the Govia Thameslink Railway franchise, which is run as a management contract rather than a traditional franchise. However, the Southern brand was retained.

=== 2007 and 2008 timetables ===
Southern was criticised for major changes to its timetables in December 2007 and December 2008.

In December 2007, Southern changed the arrangement for the splitting of services to and from London Victoria on the Arun Valley Line, opting to split trains at Horsham rather than Barnham, as well as run the portion to Portsmouth or Southampton non-stop to Barnham. Some passengers criticised this change as it increased the journey time to and from London by up to 10 minutes from certain stations, while in the event of services running behind schedule, trains were sometimes not split at Horsham, and proceeded non-stop to Barnham, leaving Arun Valley commuters at Horsham with the prospect of no onward trains.

During December 2008, further timetable changes included the introduction of the extended Gatwick Express services. However, reliability and timekeeping on some of the new services were considered poor, leading to several public meetings being held. On 22 January 2009, Southern responded to some of these criticisms. During 2009, these services have recorded improved timekeeping and criticisms have since subsided.

The new timetable also led to unhappiness due to the difference in speed and frequency of service between East Coastway services and those on the Brighton Main Line.

=== December 2010 timetable ===
Further changes to the timetable were made in December 2010; the first timetable change to include many of the requirements of the new franchise. Additional services were included at evenings and weekends. In the London area a 'metro' frequency of service was introduced on most routes with the extension of the weekday daytime four-trains-per-hour norm to late evenings (up to around midnight), Saturdays and Sundays. In addition, new late-night services were introduced from London on Friday and Saturday nights with last trains leaving central London at around 00:30.

Outside London, a new later-evening service was introduced to Uckfield from London Bridge, new late-night services from Brighton along the West Coastway line and direct services between Southampton and Brighton on Sundays.

=== Punctuality and overcrowding ===
In January 2015, Southern hit controversy when it was revealed that the 7.29am Brighton to London Victoria train failed to get in on time on any occasion out of all 240 attempts in 2014. Later in May 2015 it was revealed that Southern had fined passengers for standing in first class on an overcrowded train. Only 20% of Southern trains arrived on time in the year from April 2015 to March 2016, and there was an ongoing industrial dispute over driver-only operated trains. In late 2016, the Transport Select Committee told ministers to "get a grip" on railway franchises, with their report asking if the train operator was in breach of their contractual obligations due to the large number of cancelled trains, and went on to say, "in normal circumstances, this would be grounds for termination of the contract".

=== 2016 amended timetable ===
In 2016, the company introduced an "amended timetable [that] would be a temporary measure until staffing returned to normal" to be announced on 5 July. The National Union of Rail, Maritime and Transport Workers (RMT) trade union said that 350 services would be cancelled every day (the company ran 2,242 weekday services in the previous timetable). The company said it had insufficient personnel, and too many were taking sick leave; the union denied that high levels of sickness were the cause of cancellations, while agreeing that there were an insufficient number of guards and drivers.

The government Department for Transport said that the situation was unacceptable. While the company was obliged to notify the department in advance, this did not amount to giving the company permission for the changes. The RMT union general secretary Mick Cash said the government had permitted GTR to introduce the emergency timetable, but that it was "nothing to do with staff sickness and everything to do with gross mismanagement of this franchise and the failure to employ enough guards and drivers. ... a cynical and cowardly ploy".

The London Evening Standard mentioned Southern in an article in June 2016 "Southern rail suggests commuter goes on 100 mile detour to Clapham instead of her normal six minute journey". In June 2016, amongst criticism of the performance of its services, Go-Ahead warned of lower than anticipated profits on its Govia Thameslink Railway franchises, leading to an 18% drop in the Go-Ahead share price.

From 31 October 2016, Southern restored the full weekday timetable.

=== Control of doors and strikes ===
In 2016, Southern altered its method of door operation, with control of the doors moving from the conductor to the driver. Southern said this would allow the conductor to concentrate on the passengers, but the RMT and Associated Society of Locomotive Engineers and Firemen (ASLEF) unions said that it was an attempt to make conductors unnecessary and would be unsafe. The rail safety regulator, the Rail Standards and Safety Board has said that "We have 30 years of data which we have analysed. We have found that the driver performing the task does not increase the risk to passengers at all." During 2016, the RMT and ASLEF unions went on strike over the changes, causing severe disruption to Southern services. The strikes continued into 2017.

The BBC suggested that the RMT union are particularly worried about the new method of operation because if drivers (rather than conductors) control the doors then trains could run without conductors and thus any strike by conductors would not have the power to cancel trains.

In December 2016, it was announced that the government would pay £50 million to Southern to cover the costs of the disruption caused by the strikes, due to a deal between the government and Southern. This deal means that the government pays £38 million for lost revenue and £15 million in compensation to passengers. This deal also means that Govia Thameslink Railway will save around £1.1 million in pay for striking workers. Commentators argued that the government gave a management contract rather than a normal franchise to GTR in order to push through DOO. The management contract meant that GTR did not have the incentive to resolve strikes as a normal franchisee would have, as the government lost money from strikes rather than GTR.

On 2 February 2017, the TUC announced that talks between Southern and ASLEF had reached an agreement meaning that the dispute with ASLEF had been resolved. However, the RMT union said it was 'betrayed' by Southern and that strikes by the RMT would continue. On 29 June 2017, ASLEF implemented an overtime ban with the aim of highlighting a claimed failure by Southern to recruit adequate staff.

=== 2026 Lewes Derailment ===
At 15:54 BST on 13 August 2026, a Southern service running from London Victoria to Eastbourne derailed near Lewes railway station in East Sussex. Three carriages of the Class 387 train derailed and turned onto their sides beside the line, causing twenty people injured, including two in serious condition.

== Services ==
The standard off-peak service as of May 2026 is:

Brighton Main Line
Route	tph	Calling at
London Victoria – Littlehampton	2	Clapham Junction; East Croydon; Gatwick Airport; Haywards Heath; Burgess Hill; Hassocks; Preston Park; Hove; Portslade; Shoreham-by-Sea; Lancing; Worthing; West Worthing; Durrington-on-Sea; Goring-by-Sea; Angmering
London Victoria – Eastbourne	1	Clapham Junction; East Croydon; Gatwick Airport; Haywards Heath; Wivelsfield; Cooksbridge; Lewes; Polegate; Hampden Park
London Victoria – Ore	1	Clapham Junction; East Croydon; Gatwick Airport; Haywards Heath; Wivelsfield; Plumpton; Lewes; Polegate; Eastbourne (Note: Trains reverse here); Hampden Park; Pevensey & Westham; Normans Bay; Cooden Beach; Collington; Bexhill; St Leonards Warrior Square; Hastings
Arun Valley line
Route	tph	Calling at
London Victoria – Portsmouth Harbour	2	Clapham Junction; East Croydon; Gatwick Airport; Three Bridges; Crawley; Horsham; Barnham; Chichester; Fishbourne (1 tph); Bosham (1 tph); Nutbourne (1 tph); Southbourne; Emsworth; Warblington (1 tph); Havant; Hilsea; Fratton; Portsmouth & Southsea; This route splits/merges at Horsham with the route to Bognor Regis (see below). Fishbourne, Bosham, Nutbourne and Warblington are served by the same train
London Victoria – Bognor Regis	2	Clapham Junction; East Croydon; Gatwick Airport; Three Bridges; Crawley; Horsham; Christ's Hospital; Billingshurst; Pulborough; Amberley; Arundel; Ford; Barnham; This route splits/merges at Horsham with the route to Portsmouth Harbour, see above.
Seaford branch line
Route	tph	Calling at
Brighton – Seaford	2	London Road (Brighton); Moulsecoomb; Falmer; Lewes; Southease (1 tph); Newhaven Town; Newhaven Harbour (1 tph); Bishopstone; Services alternate between serving Southease and Newhaven Harbour
East Coastway and Marshlink lines
Route	tph	Calling at
Brighton – Eastbourne	1	London Road (Brighton); Moulsecoomb; Falmer; Lewes; Glynde; Berwick; Polegate; Hampden Park
Brighton – Ore	1	Falmer; Lewes; Polegate; Hampden Park (Ore-bound only); Eastbourne; Hampden Park (Brighton-bound only); Bexhill; St Leonards Warrior Square; Hastings
Eastbourne – Ashford International	1	Hampden Park; Pevensey & Westham; Cooden Beach; Collington; Bexhill; St Leonards Warrior Square; Hastings; Ore; Three Oaks; Winchelsea; Rye; Appledore; Ham Street
West Coastway line
Route	tph	Calling at
Brighton – Southampton Central	2	Hove; Portslade; Southwick; Shoreham-by-Sea; Lancing; Worthing; Angmering; Ford; Barnham; Chichester; Southbourne; Emsworth; Havant; Cosham; Portchester (1 tph); Fareham; Swanwick; Woolston
Brighton – Portsmouth & Southsea	1	Hove; Portslade; Southwick; Shoreham-by-Sea; Lancing; East Worthing; Worthing; West Worthing; Durrington-on-Sea; Goring-by-Sea; Angmering; Barnham; Chichester; Havant; Fratton
Brighton to Chichester via Littlehampton	1	Hove; Aldrington; Portslade; Fishersgate; Southwick; Shoreham-by-Sea; Lancing; East Worthing; Worthing; West Worthing; Durrington-on-Sea; Goring-by-Sea; Angmering; Littlehampton; Ford; Barnham
Barnham – Bognor Regis	2	Shuttle service
Oxted line
Route	tph	Calling at
London Victoria – East Grinstead	2	Clapham Junction; East Croydon; Sanderstead, Riddlesdown; Upper Warlingham; Woldingham; Oxted; Hurst Green; Lingfield; Dormans
London Bridge – Uckfield	1	East Croydon; Oxted; Hurst Green; Edenbridge Town; Hever; Cowden; Ashurst; Eridge; Crowborough; Buxted
Reigate and Redhill–Tonbridge line
Route	tph	Calling at
London Victoria – Reigate	2	Clapham Junction; East Croydon; Purley; Coulsdon South; Merstham; Redhill
Redhill – Tonbridge	1	Nutfield; Godstone; Edenbridge; Penshurst; Leigh
West London Route
Route	tph	Calling at
Watford Junction – East Croydon	1	Harrow & Wealdstone; Wembley Central; Shepherd's Bush; Kensington (Olympia); West Brompton; Imperial Wharf; Clapham Junction; Balham; Streatham Common; Norbury; Thornton Heath; Selhurst
Mole Valley Line
Route	tph	Calling at
London Victoria – Dorking	1	Clapham Junction; Balham; Mitcham Eastfields; Mitcham Junction; Hackbridge; Carshalton; Sutton; Cheam; Epsom; Ashtead; Leatherhead
London Victoria – Horsham	1	Clapham Junction; Balham; Mitcham Eastfields; Mitcham Junction; Hackbridge; Carshalton; Sutton; Cheam; Ewell East; Epsom; Ashtead; Leatherhead; Box Hill & Westhumble; Dorking; Holmwood; Ockley; Warnham
London Bridge – Epsom	2	Norwood Junction; West Croydon; Waddon; Wallington; Carshalton Beeches; Sutton; Cheam; Ewell East
Caterham and Tattenham Corner lines
Route	tph	Calling at
London Bridge – Caterham	2	Norwood Junction; East Croydon; South Croydon; Purley Oaks; Purley; Kenley; Whyteleafe; Whyteleafe South; This route splits/merges at Purley with the route to Tattenham Corner, see below.
London Bridge – Tattenham Corner	2	Norwood Junction; East Croydon; South Croydon; Purley Oaks; Purley; Reedham; Coulsdon Town; Woodmansterne; Chipstead; Kingswood; Tadworth; This route splits/merges at Purley with the route to Caterham, see above.
London Metro
Route	tph	Calling at
London Victoria – Epsom Downs	2	Battersea Park; Clapham Junction; Wandsworth Common; Balham; Streatham Common; Norbury; Thornton Heath; Selhurst; West Croydon; Waddon; Wallington; Carshalton Beeches; Sutton; Belmont; Banstead
London Victoria – West Croydon	2	Battersea Park; Clapham Junction; Balham; Streatham Hill; West Norwood; Gipsy Hill; Crystal Palace; Norwood Junction
London Victoria – London Bridge	2	Battersea Park; Clapham Junction; Wandsworth Common; Balham; Streatham Hill; West Norwood; Gipsy Hill; Crystal Palace; Sydenham; Forest Hill; Honor Oak Park; Brockley; New Cross Gate
London Bridge – East Croydon	2	South Bermondsey; Queens Road Peckham; Peckham Rye; East Dulwich; North Dulwich; Tulse Hill; Streatham; Streatham Common; Norbury; Thornton Heath; Selhurst
London Bridge – Beckenham Junction	2	South Bermondsey; Queens Road Peckham; Peckham Rye; East Dulwich; North Dulwich; Tulse Hill; West Norwood; Gipsy Hill; Crystal Palace; Birkbeck

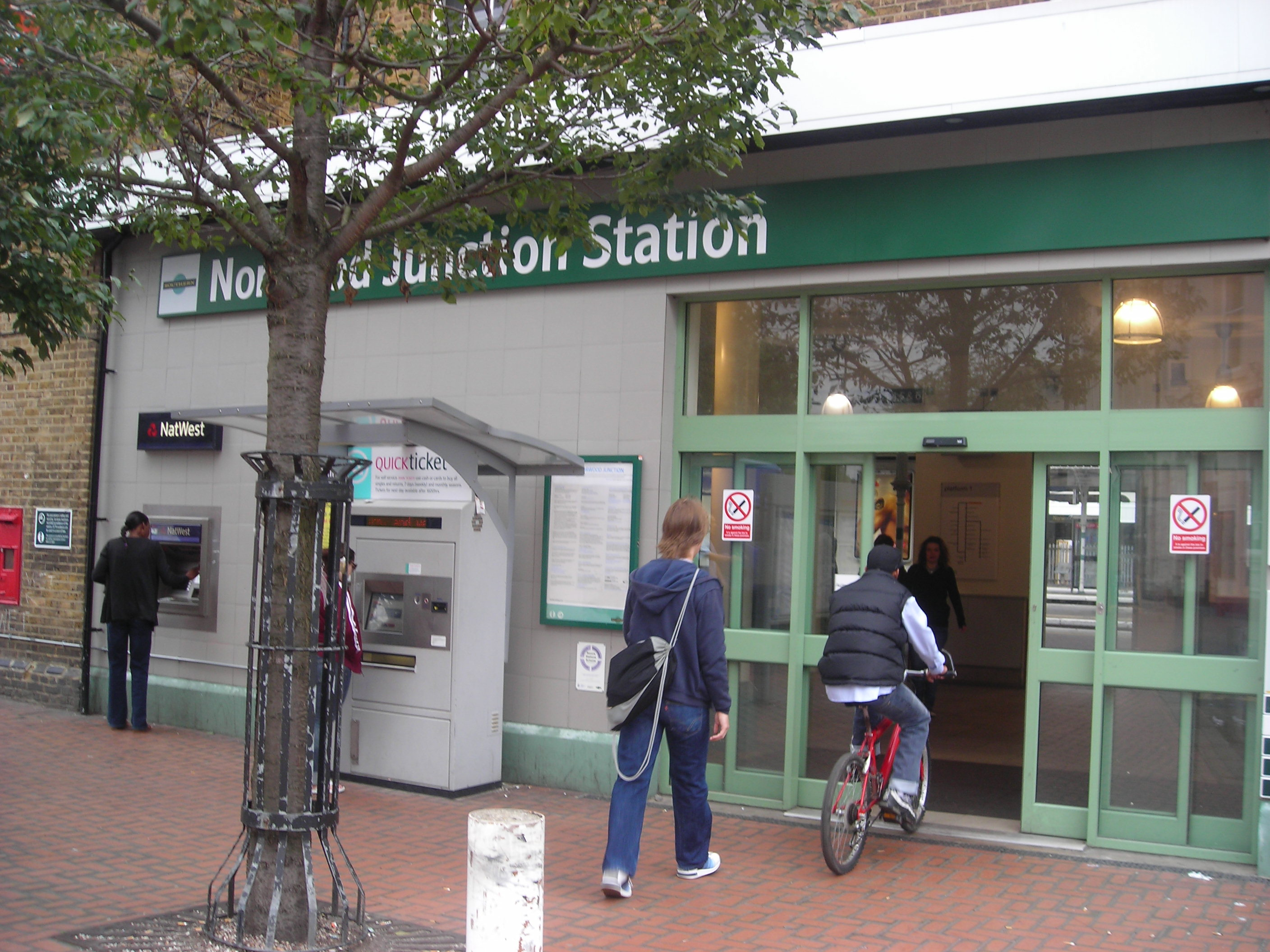
Southern exterior signage at Norwood Junction station (now replaced by London Overground signage)

== Rolling stock ==
As of May 2022, Southern services are almost entirely operated by 214 Class 377 electric multiple units, with the exception of services on the unelectrified Marshlink line and the Uckfield branch of the Oxted line, which use Class 171 diesel multiple units.

South Central inherited a fleet of Class 205, Class 207, Class 319, Class 421, Class 423, Class 455 and Class 456 multiple-unit trains from Connex South Central. Southern inherited a Class 73 locomotive and Class 460 Juniper trains from Gatwick Express.

A franchise commitment was to replace all the Mark 1 slam-door stock, resulting in Southern ordering 28 three-car DC, 139 four-car DC and 15 four-car dual-voltage Class 377 Electrostars in September 2001 and March 2002 to replace the Class 421, Class 422 and Class 423s.

In August 2002, Southern ordered nine two-car and six four-car Class 171 Turbostars to replace the Class 205s and Class 207s on the routes that are not fully electrified. A tenth two-car Class 171 was transferred from South West Trains, entering traffic in July 2007.

In 2007, Southern ordered 12 four-car, dual-voltage Class 377/5 Electrostars to replace the remaining twelve Class 319s for transfer to First Capital Connect. In March 2008 Go Ahead purchased a further 11 Class 377/5s. All 23 ended up being sublet to First Capital Connect to provide extra stock for the Thameslink Programme Key Output Zero changes from March 2009. However, due to delays in their production, Class 377/2s were also sublet. To cover for this, Class 350/1s were subleased from London Midland.

To provide stock for the extended Gatwick Express services to Brighton, in 2008 Southern leased 17 Class 442 Wessex Electrics withdrawn by South West Trains in early 2007. After retaining the franchise in 2009, Southern leased the remaining seven Class 442s. The last of the Class 460 Junipers were withdrawn in September 2012.

To release Class 377/3s for use on London suburban services, Southern introduced a fleet of ex-London Overground Class 313s on the Coastway lines from May 2010. The Class 313s remained in service until May 2023, when they were withdrawn and replaced by Class 377s.

During 2011, Southern announced that, because of delays in procuring new trains for the Thameslink Programme, the 23 Class 377/5s on sub-lease to First Capital Connect would not be returned in time to deliver the operator's planned capacity increases from the December 2013 timetable change. It therefore began a process to procure 130 new vehicles. It was announced in December 2011 that Bombardier had been contracted to supply 26 five-car Class 377/6s. In November 2012, it was announced that an option for a further 40 vehicles was being exercised.

All twenty-four Class 456s were transferred to South West Trains in 2014 after the introduction of the Class 377/6 fleet.

In April 2016, Southern commenced a lease for nine three-carriage Class 170s last used by First ScotRail from Eversholt Rail Group. Four (170421–424) moved to Wolverton Works in 2015 and were reconfigured as two two-carriage and two four-carriage Class 171s. The other five (170416–420) remained in Scotland on sub-lease to Abellio ScotRail and were scheduled to move to Southern in 2018.

In May 2022, Southern withdrew its Class 455s and received 2 Class 377s from Southeastern.

On 7 September 2022, three Class 171s, having been reformed to three-car formations and renumbered to 170422–424, transferred to East Midlands Railway.

Between December 2024 and December 2025, Southern is set to transfer 13 Class 377/1s (377121–133) to Southeastern to replace ageing Class 465 units. This will be made possible by the movement of 30 ex-Greater Anglia Class 379 sets to Great Northern route services from London Kings Cross, which will in turn allow Class 387/1 dual-voltage units currently in service with Great Northern to be released to work on Southern routes.

=== Current fleet ===
Family	Class	Image	Type	Top speed		Number	Carriages	Routes operated	Built
Family	Class	Image	Type	mph	km/h	Number	Carriages	Routes operated	Built
Bombardier Turbostar	171		DMU	100	160	13	3	London Bridge to Uckfield; Eastbourne to Ashford International	2003–04
Bombardier Turbostar	171		DMU	100	160	4	2	London Bridge to Uckfield; Eastbourne to Ashford International	2003–04
Bombardier Electrostar	377/1		EMU	100	160	55	4	Entire Southern network apart from sections between Hurst Green and Uckfield & between Ore and Ashford International	2001–14
Bombardier Electrostar	377/2		EMU	100	160	15	4	Entire Southern network apart from sections between Hurst Green and Uckfield & between Ore and Ashford International	2001–14
Bombardier Electrostar	377/3		EMU	100	160	28	3	Entire Southern network apart from sections between Hurst Green and Uckfield & between Ore and Ashford International	2001–14
Bombardier Electrostar	377/4		EMU	100	160	75	4	Entire Southern network apart from sections between Hurst Green and Uckfield & between Ore and Ashford International	2001–14
Bombardier Electrostar	377/6		EMU	100	160	26	5	Entire Southern network apart from sections between Hurst Green and Uckfield & between Ore and Ashford International	2001–14
Bombardier Electrostar	377/7		EMU	100	160	8	5	Entire Southern network apart from sections between Hurst Green and Uckfield & between Ore and Ashford International	2001–14
Bombardier Electrostar	387/1; 387/2; 387/3		EMU	110	177	46 (Shared with Gatwick Express)	4	London Victoria to Eastbourne/Ore; Brighton to Eastbourne/Ore; Brighton to Southampton Central	2016–17

=== Past fleet ===
Former units operated by Southern include:

Family	Class	Image	Type	mph	km/h	Number	Carriages	Built	Withdrawn	Notes
Turbostar	171		DMU	100	160	3	3	2003-04	2022	Transferred to East Midlands Railway
Thumper	205 (3H)		DMU	75	120	34	2/3	1957–62	2004	Replaced by Class 171 Turbostar
Thumper	207 (3D)		DMU	75	120	19	3	1962	2004	Replaced by Class 171 Turbostar
BREL 1972	313		EMU	75	120	19	3	1976–77	2023	Replaced by Class 377 Electrostar
BR Second Generation (Mark 3)	319		EMU	100	161	20	4	1987	2008	Replaced by Class 377 Electrostar
Siemens Desiro	350/1		EMU	100	161	Several	4	2004–05	2009	Subleased from London Midland in 2008 to provide cover for Class 377 Electrostar units subleased to First Capital Connect. After newer Class 377 Electrostar trains were built, these units were returned to London Midland. Replaced by newer Class 377 Electrostar units.
Bombardier Electrostar	377		EMU	100	161	9	4	2002-03	2024-25	Replaced by Class 387 Electrostar
	421 (4CIG)		EMU	90	145		4	1964–66	2005	Replaced by Class 377 Electrostar
	423 (4VEP)		EMU	90	145	50	4	1967–71	2005	Replaced by Class 377 Electrostar
BR Second Generation (Mark 3)	455		EMU	75	120	46	4	1982–84	2022	Replaced by Class 377 Electrostar
BR Second Generation (Mark 3)	456		EMU	75	120	24	2	1990–91	2014	Replaced by Class 377 Electrostar

=== Depots ===
Southern's fleet is maintained at Brighton Lovers Walk and Selhurst depots. The Gatwick Express fleet is maintained at Stewarts Lane.

Light maintenance is also carried out at Littlehampton for the electric fleet, and St Leonards for the class 171 fleet when on Marshlink services.

== Future ==
Southern, as part of its successful bid for the South Central franchise in 2009, made several commitments to improving services across the network. These included:

- Increasing the length of suburban services in South London to 10 cars between 2011 and 2013
- Increasing the service level on all routes in South London to 4 trains per hour (tph) until 23:00 each day, and the introduction of late-night services on Fridays and Saturdays
- The introduction of an hourly service on Sundays between Brighton and Southampton Central, and an increase in the number of late-night services between Brighton and Worthing
- The introduction of late-night services on the London to Uckfield route
- Installation of new ticket gates at 22 stations across the network
- Increasing the number of car-parking spaces at stations by 1,000 and the number of cycle spaces by 1,500
- Cleaning and refreshing of all stations and trains on the network
- Major refurbishments to seven stations: Brighton, Haywards Heath, Hove, Lewes, Redhill, Three Bridges and Worthing

=== Uckfield–Lewes line ===
The franchise consultation paper released at the beginning of the 2009 franchising process stated that the ultimate franchise agreement would include a change mechanism to enable the DfT to incorporate additional routes into the South Central franchise, and it invited bidders to submit priced options for schemes put forward by stakeholders. One such scheme could, as indicated in the South Central Franchise Consultation Paper, be the reopening of the Uckfield – Lewes line, closed in 1969. During the 2010s, several interested parties have been examining the possibility of reopening the line.

=== Future of the franchise ===
In January 2016, Transport for London announced a proposal to take over the London suburban parts of the franchise in 2021, through a partnership with the Department for Transport to form a new suburban metro service. However, the plan was rejected by the then Transport Secretary Chris Grayling in December 2016.

In January 2017, it was reported that the Department for Transport was considering suspending the franchise if the service did not improve.

On 17 June 2021, the DfT extended the contract from 19 September 2021 to 31 March 2022.

The contract for the delivery of Thameslink, Southern and Great Northern services was extended by the DfT on 25 March 2022. The contract was then due to expire on 1 April 2028. However, due to the Government's decision to establish Great British Railways and thus end the franchising policy of previous Conservative Party administrations, the contract was terminated on 31 May 2026 and succeeded by Greater Thameslink Railway.

== Fares ==
Southern was criticised in January 2007 for not wishing to introduce Oyster Pay As You Go on its London routes, stating that it was not financially viable. In 2007, Southern introduced Oyster on its Watford Junction to Clapham Junction route, and the company later agreed in principle to the introduction of Oyster across its network, but did not give any firm timescale, managing director Chris Burchell saying

"There are still a number of outstanding issues that need to be discussed with TfL, but we do not believe these will prevent us making PAYG a reality on our network. We look forward to discussions with TfL on how we can make this happen as soon as possible for our passengers."

In its successful franchise bid in 2009, Southern said it was committed to rolling out Oyster Pay As You Go in the London area, but also that such a move was subject to industry agreement. Since January 2010, Oyster Pay As You Go has been valid on all its London routes, along with most other train services in the London area. In addition, Oyster is valid on Southern services beyond the Greater London boundary as far as Epsom, Epsom Downs, Tattenham Corner, Upper Warlingham, Caterham and Gatwick Airport. Two years later, some customers were still discontent about inconsistent Pay As You Go fares across the network, compared to operating companies like c2c where it was fully integrated.

In 2012, Southern became the first rail company in England to use the ITSO card on its network. The Key is a smartcard similar to the Oyster Card, allowing tickets across the network to be purchased electronically.

Southern sell a DaySave ticket, which allows unlimited off-peak travel on any train in the company's network for one day. The ticket can only be purchased in advance online, or at a selected number of stations.

== See also ==
- Rail transport in Great Britain
- Urban rail in the United Kingdom

Preceded by Connex South Central	Operator of South Central franchise 2001–2009	Succeeded by Southern; South Central (incl Gatwick Express) franchise
Preceded by Gatwick Express	Operator of Gatwick Express franchise 2008–2009	Succeeded by Southern; South Central (incl Gatwick Express) franchise
Preceded by Southern; South Central franchise	Operator of South Central (incl Gatwick Express) franchise 2009–2015	Succeeded by Govia Thameslink Railway; Thameslink, Southern and Great Northern franchise
Preceded by Southern; Gatwick Express franchise	Operator of South Central (incl Gatwick Express) franchise 2009–2015	Succeeded by Govia Thameslink Railway; Thameslink, Southern and Great Northern franchise
Preceded by Southern; South Central (incl Gatwick Express) franchise	Sub-brand of Thameslink, Southern and Great Northern franchise 2015–2026	Succeeded by Greater Thameslink Railway
Preceded by Govia Thameslink Railway; Thameslink, Southern and Great Northern franchise	Sub-brand of Greater Thameslink Railway; 2026 – present	Incumbent
