= Uckfield railway station =

Railway station in East Sussex, England

Coordinates: 50.969°N 0.096°E

Uckfield
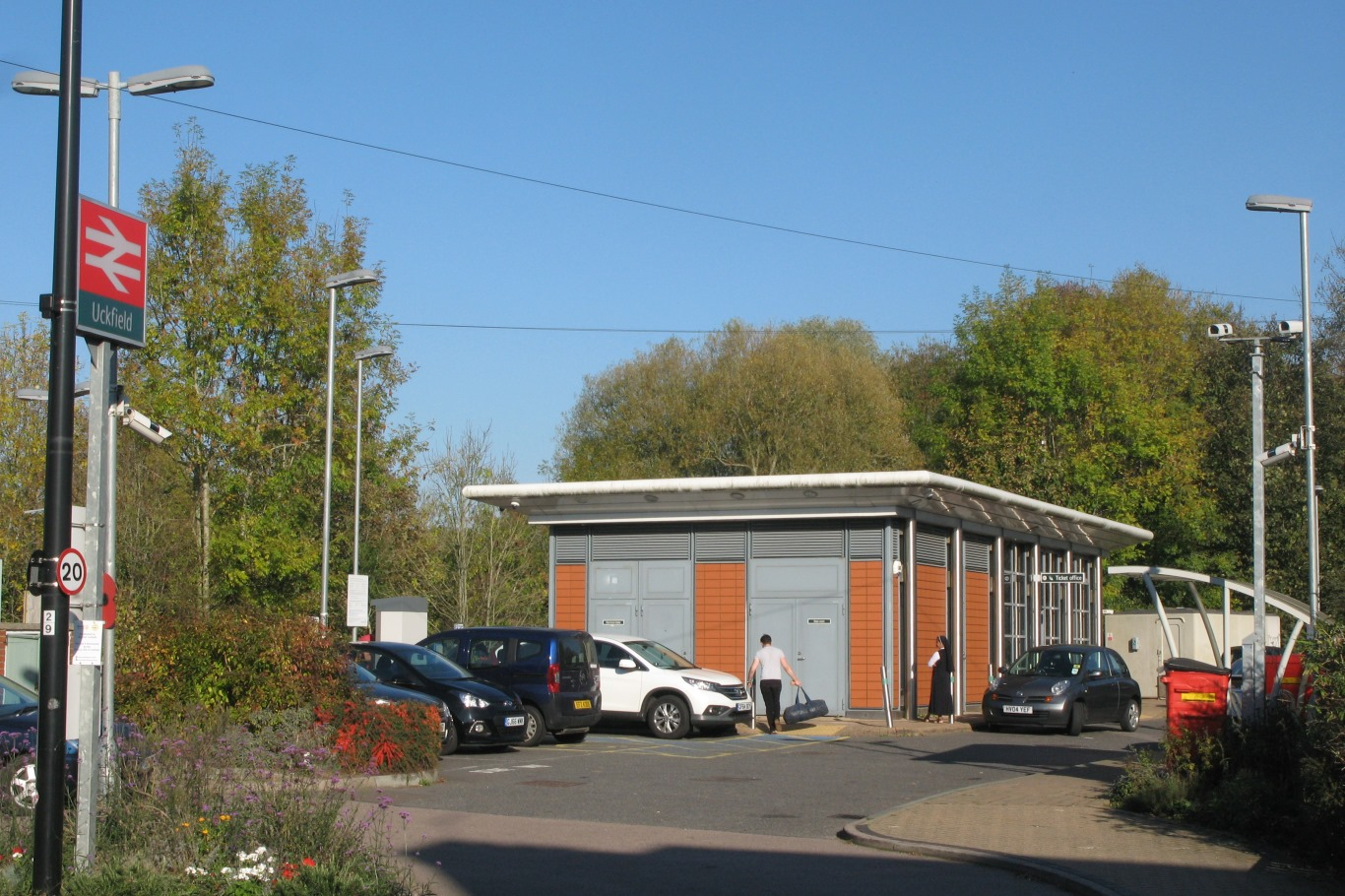

General information
- Location: Uckfield, Wealden; England
- Grid reference: TQ473209
- Manager: Southern
- Platforms: 1

Other information
- Station code: UCK
- Classification: DfT category E

History
- Original company: Lewes and Uckfield Railway
- Pre-grouping: London, Brighton and South Coast Railway
- Post-grouping: Southern Railway

Key dates
- 18 October 1858: Opened
- 1868: Building resited
- 1901: Rebuilt
- January 1990: Track singled
- 13 May 1991: Resited and temporary ticket office installed
- 9 December 2000: 1901 building demolished
- 16 March 2010: Permanent building constructed

Passengers
- 2020/21: ▼48,824
- 2021/22: ▲0.159 million
- 2022/23: ▲0.200 million
- 2023/24: ▲0.213 million
- 2024/25: ▲0.235 million
Location
Notes
- Passenger statistics from the Office of Rail and Road

Uckfield railway station is the southern terminus of a branch of the Oxted Line in England, serving the town of Uckfield, East Sussex. It is 46 miles 8 chains (74.2 km) from London Bridge.

The station and all trains that call are operated by Southern. Until 1969, the line continued southwards to Lewes and Brighton.

== History ==
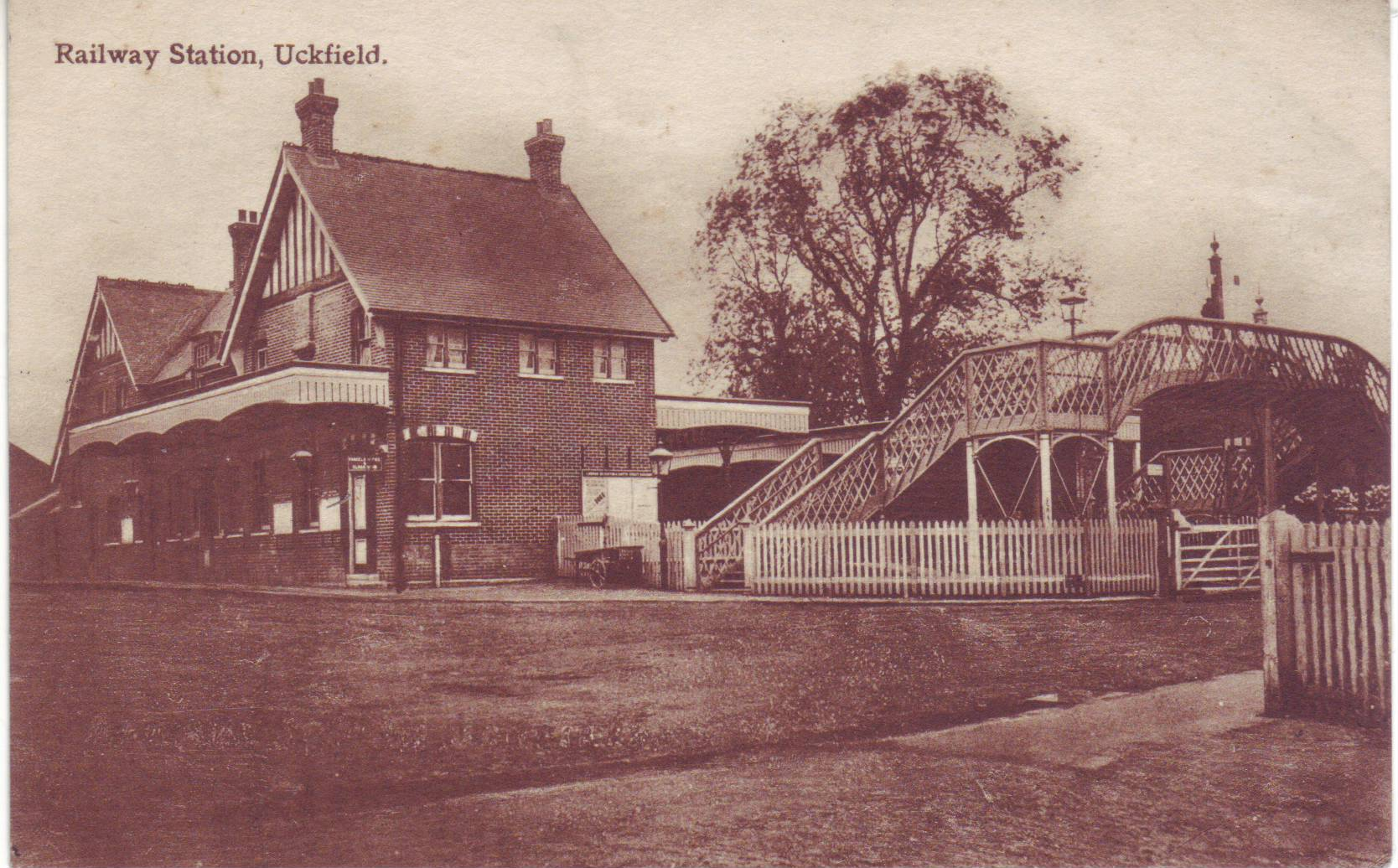
A postcard of the 1901 station in the 1920s

The first station was opened in 1858 by the Lewes and Uckfield Railway Company. It was situated south of the High Street and became a through station when the line was extended northwards to Tunbridge Wells West in 1868.

After closure of the line south to Lewes in 1969, the original station found itself on the wrong side of the High Street level crossing, which created traffic congestion whenever a train was arriving or departing. It was therefore decided to close the original station and open a new station on the other side of the High Street. The present Uckfield station opened in 1991, replacing the original structure, which was sited 55 yards (50 m) to the south. The original station was demolished on 9 December 2000, after having been damaged by flooding.

As part of Network Rail's national stations improvement programme, Uckfield received a new station building to replace the 1991 Portakabin-type structure which was deemed "not fit for purpose". The new building was built to Network Rail's modular, pre-fabricated design, as used at Mitcham Eastfields and Greenhithe. The components for Uckfield's new station – including a ticket office, public toilet, staff accommodation, ticket hall and café – were manufactured by Britspace in Yorkshire and installed by contractors Bryen & Langley. The new building, which cost £750,000, was opened for passenger use on 16 March 2010.

| Preceding station | National Rail | Following station |
|---|---|---|
| Buxted | Southern; Oxted Line; Uckfield branch | Terminus |
| | Disused railways | |
| Buxted; Line and station open | British Rail; Southern Region; Wealden Line | Isfield; Line closed; station open |

== Services ==
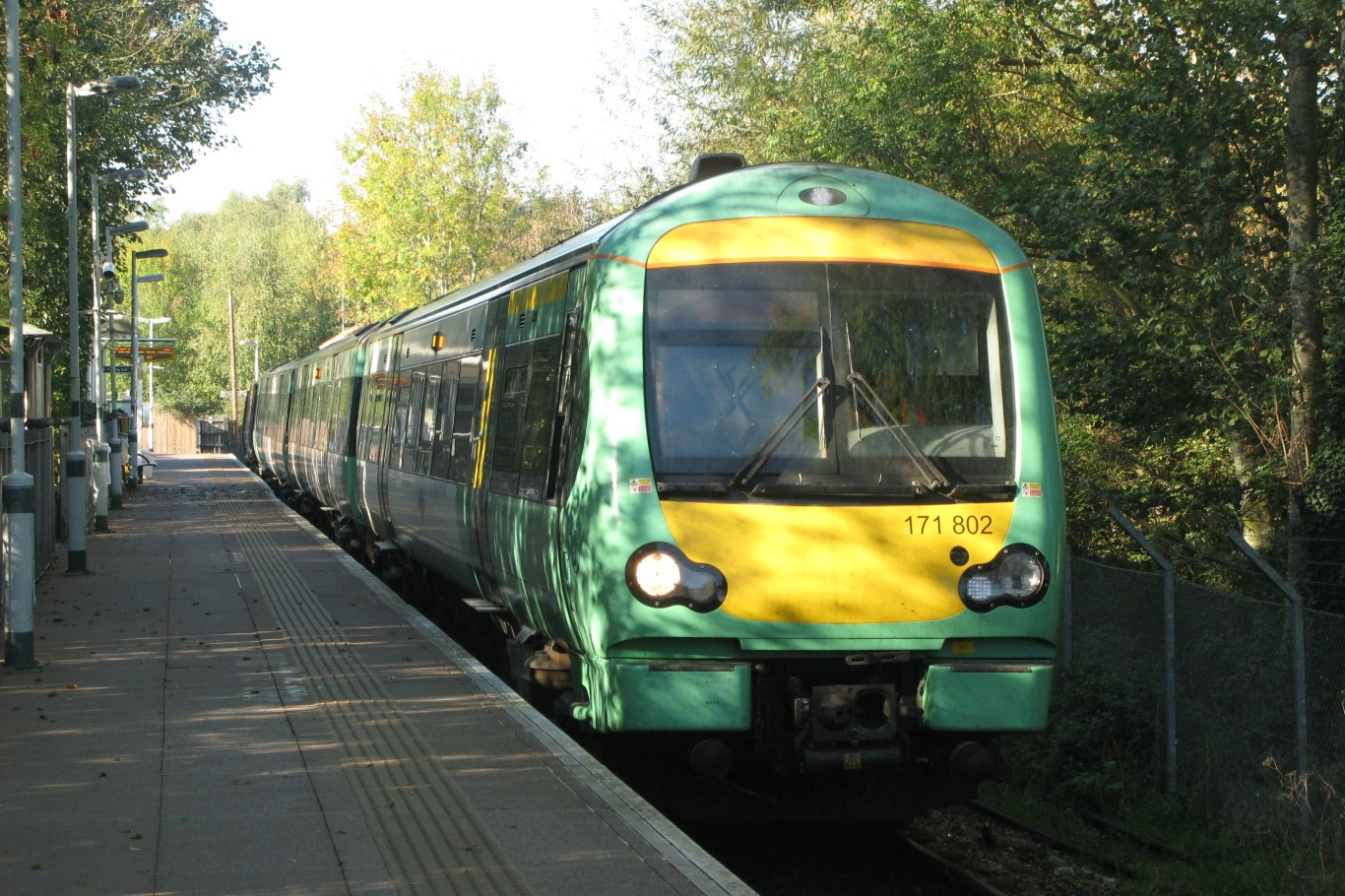
A Southern Class 171 at Uckfield, bound for London Bridge

The typical off-peak service is one train per hour to London Bridge, operated by a Class 171. They call at Buxted, Crowborough, Eridge, Ashurst, Cowden, Hever, Edenbridge Town, Hurst Green, Oxted and East Croydon. On Sundays, this is reduced to an hourly shuttle to Oxted calling at all stations. Previously, most off-peak trains from Uckfield only went as far as Oxted, for interchange with East Grinstead line services, with the line completely shut on Sundays. Since the service has been operated by Southern, most trains run through to London Bridge, the Sunday service has been restored, and passenger numbers have risen. In December 2010, a later last train from London Bridge (at around 11 pm) was introduced, allowing passengers to return from London in the late evening.

== Future ==
=== Platform extension ===
Platforms on the Uckfield branch of the Oxted Line were extended in 2016 to hold ten-carriage trains, to allow longer services to run during peak hours. To lengthen the trains to ten coaches, Southern acquired four Class 170 Turbostars from ScotRail. The Class 170s were converted to Class 171s to enable full compatibility with Southern's existing Class 171 fleet.

=== Electrification ===
Whereas the neighbouring East Grinstead line has 750 V DC electric traction, motive power on Uckfield line is provided by Class 171 diesel multiple units, being the only passenger line in the South East (other than the Marshlink line) to be electrified. It has been proposed many times that the line be electrified, but this is considered too expensive for the amount of passenger traffic. Rail usage figures published in March 2010 showed that journeys from the station increased by 179% in the five years to 2008/09.

=== Proposed Wealden Line reopening ===
Since 1986, there has been a campaign to re-open the line south of Uckfield through to Lewes, known as the Wealden Line, which has attracted cross-party support. In 2008, the "Wealdenlink" presentation was published, giving new impetus to the campaign for reinstatement. On 23 July 2008, a Network Rail study, commissioned by the Central Rail Corridor Board (a joint group of local councils and stakeholders), reported that there was no economic case for reopening, citing a £141 million cost and a low benefit–cost ratio of 0.64 to 0.79; a figure of 1.5 is the minimum required by the Department for Transport for a scheme to be considered viable.
