= British Rail Class 171 =

British diesel multiple unit train

British Rail Class 171 Turbostar
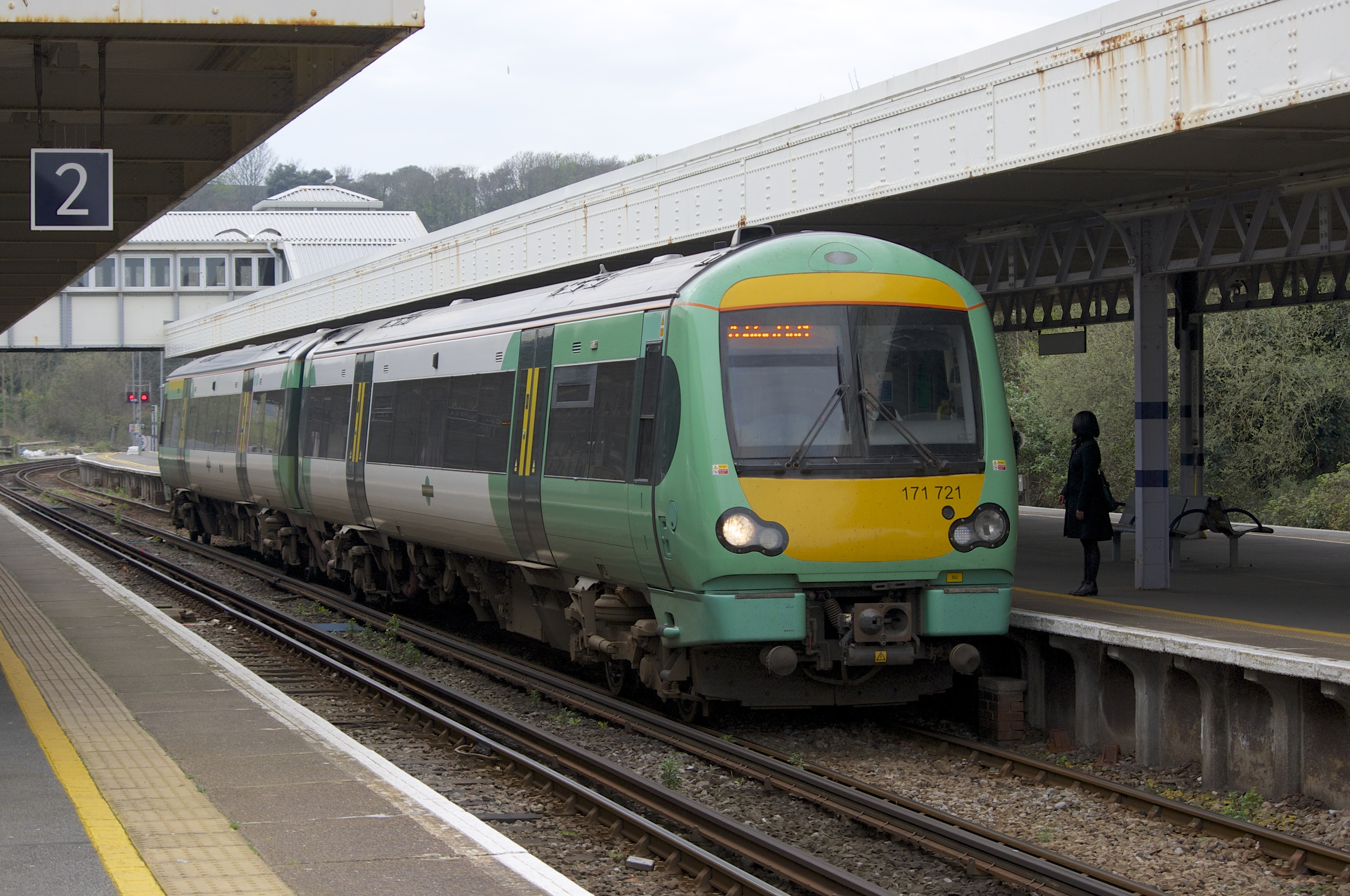
- Southern 171/7 at Hastings in 2014

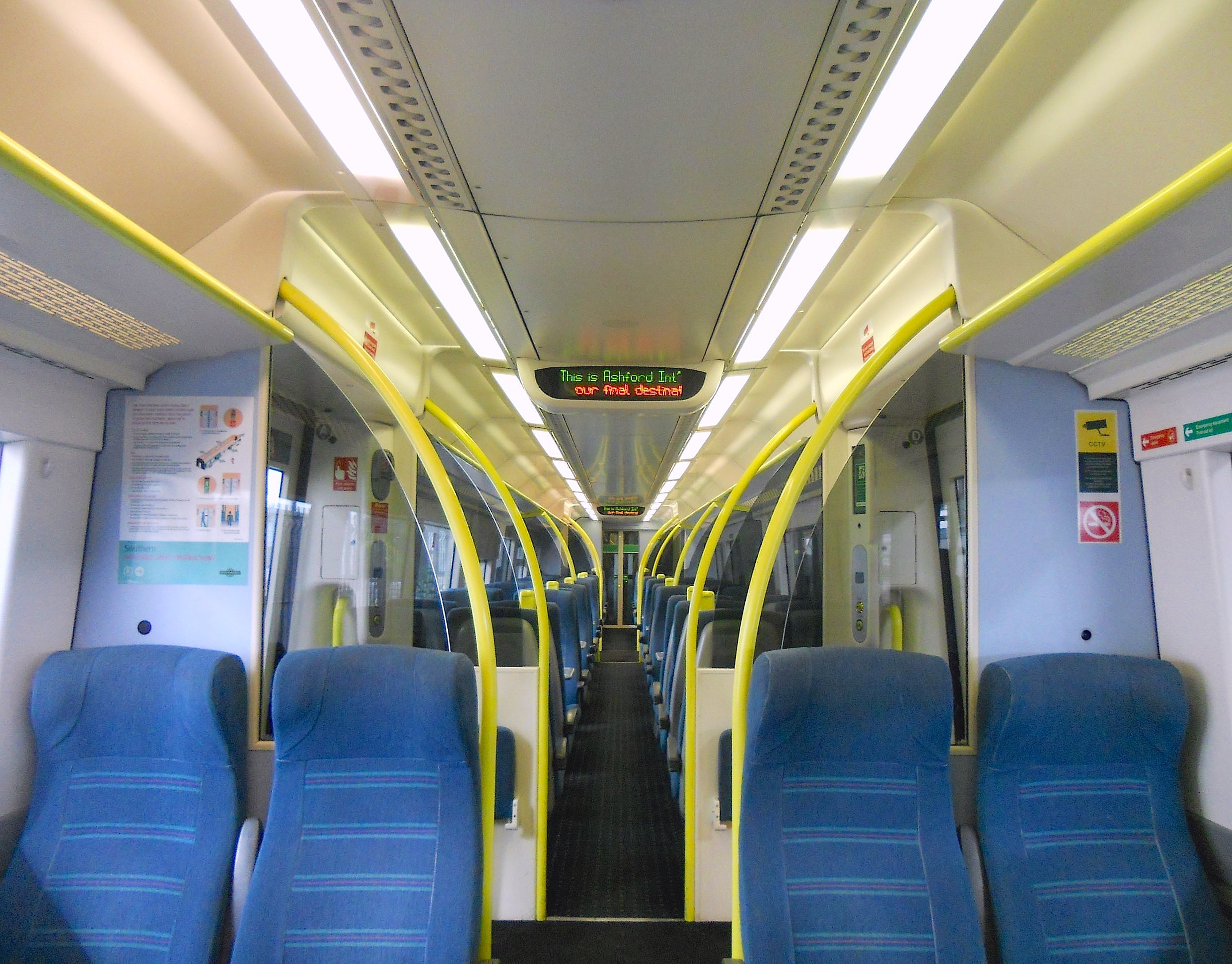
- The Standard Class interior aboard a Class 171
- In service: 2003 - present
- Manufacturer: Bombardier Transportation
- Built at: Derby Litchurch Lane Works
- Family name: Turbostar
- Replaced: Class 205; Class 207
- Constructed: 2003–2004
- Number built: 20 sets
- Number in service: 17 sets
- Formation: 2 or 3 cars per unit
- Fleet numbers: 171201; 171727 – 171730; 171801 – 171812
- Capacity: 107 seats (2 Car); 241 seats (former 4 Car)
- Operator: Southern

Specifications
- Car length: 23.62 m (77 ft 5 7/8 in)
- Width: 2.69 m (8 ft 9 7/8 in)
- Height: 3.77 m (12 ft 4 3/8 in)
- Maximum speed: 100 mph (160 km/h)
- Weight: Class 171/7: 90.41 tonnes (88.98 long tons; 99.66 short tons); Class 171/8: 176.21 tonnes (173.43 long tons; 194.24 short tons)
- Prime mover: One MTU 6R 183TD13H per car
- Engine type: Turbo-diesel
- Cylinder count: 6
- Displacement: 13 L (790 cu in)
- Power output: 422 hp (315 kW) per engine
- Transmission: Voith Hydraulic T211rzze; 2 axles driven per car
- Acceleration: 0.5 m/s^{2} (1.1 mph/s)
- Braking system: Air
- Safety systems: AWS, TPWS
- Coupling system: Dellner
- Multiple working: Within class
- Track gauge: 1,435 mm (4 ft 8 1/2 in) standard gauge

The British Rail Class 171 Turbostar is a type of diesel-hydraulic multiple unit passenger train built by Bombardier Transportation at Derby Litchurch Lane Works in England. It is identical to the Class 170, except for the replacement of the BSI coupler with a Dellner coupler. This provision was made to allow emergency joining with Class 377 DC third-rail electric units, which Southern runs extensively on most lines. The units work on the southern regions of the British railway system, operating services from London Bridge to Uckfield and from Eastbourne to Ashford International, these routes being unelectrified between Hurst Green Junction and Uckfield and between Ore and Ashford International, respectively.

The fleet is operated by Greater Thameslink Railway on Southern services.

== Design ==
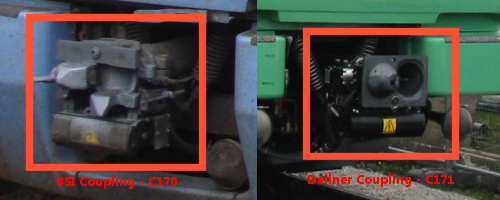
Class 170 on the left has a BSI compact coupler whereas Class 171 on the right has a Dellner coupler

The fleet is fitted with coupling devices (Dellner) different from other Turbostars, and is classified as Class 171 for this reason. The four-car units were built with the new couplers, but Class 170 two-car units were fitted at a later date, and reclassified as Class 171/7 after the modification. Three more two-car units were later acquired, but these were built from new with the new couplers.

Southern gained 170392 from South West Trains. The coupler on this unit has also been changed to the Dellner type. The unit has been reclassified and renumbered from 170392 to 171730. This unit was first delivered carrying Southern livery and the number 170727 (because SWT needed another 170 and it was cheaper to place another unit on the Southern order than place a new order). It never operated in this form and was transferred to South West Trains where it became 170392.

These trains have electronic onboard displays and automated next station announcements.

== Operations ==
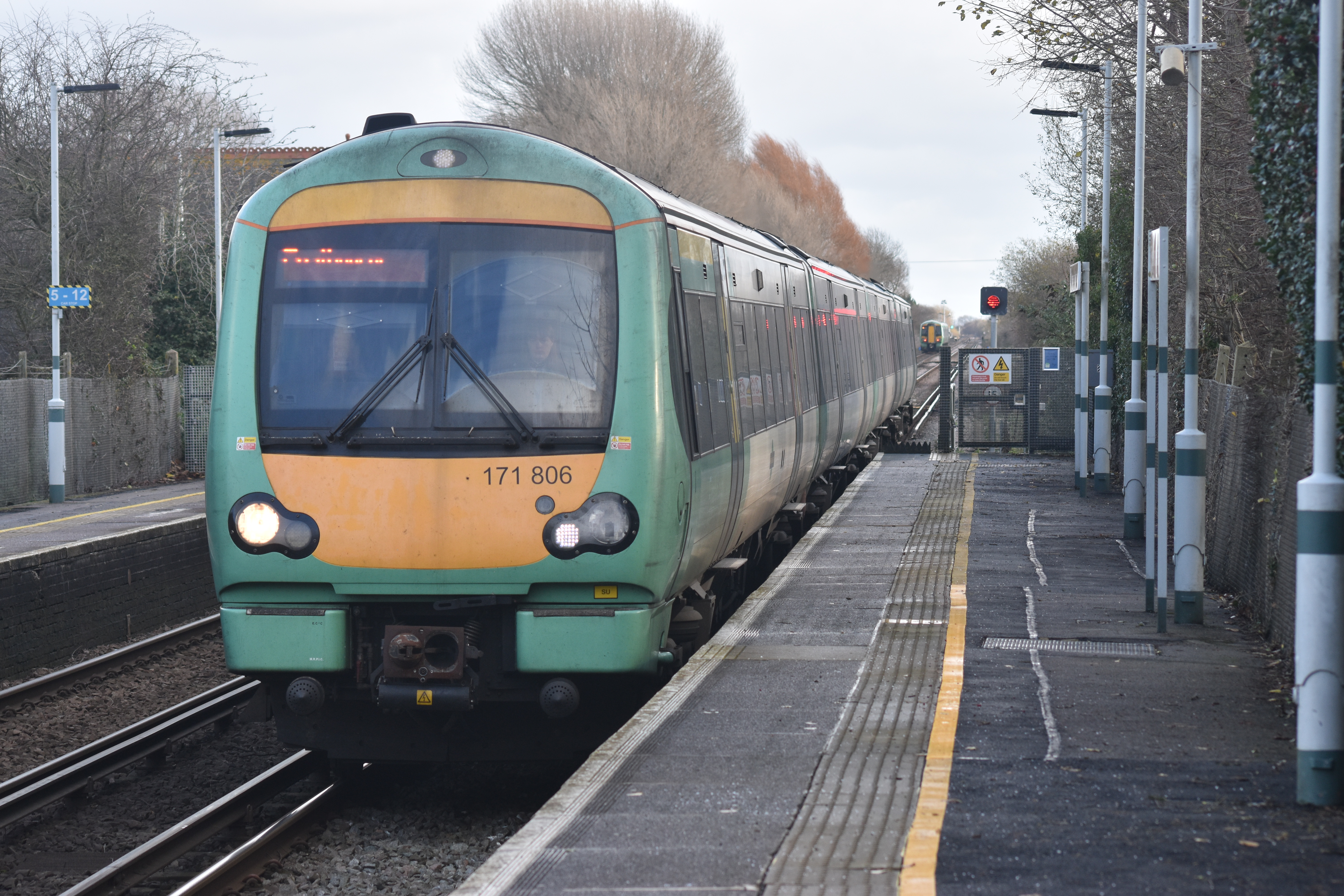
A Class 171 at Pevensey & Westham

Southern acquired an initial fleet of six two-car Class 171/7 and six four-car Class 171/8 units, to replace the slam-door Class 205 and Class 207 "Thumper" fleet.

The first units were introduced in 2003 on the Marshlink Line from Ashford to Hastings and were extended in 2005 to Brighton, but in 2018 the service was cut back to Eastbourne due to overcrowding and a shortage of additional diesel stock. Services on the Oxted to Uckfield branch of the Oxted Line were later also transferred to Turbostar operation. Services from London Bridge to Uckfield went over to Turbostar operation in late 2004.

The Ashford-Eastbourne service, as well as peak-time Ashford-Rye and Ashford-Hastings shuttle services, were nearly always operated by the two-car Class 171/7; the four-car Class 171/8 units occasionally appeared on the route during special events such as the Rye bonfire celebrations.

The Uckfield-London Bridge and Uckfield-Oxted services used both the two-car and the four-car units. These units were often coupled together, forming six-car, eight-car or ten-car trains following platform extensions at Uckfield line stations.

As of August 2022, Southern operated 20 sets; 12 two-carriage sets and eight four-carriage sets. In September 2022 the two Class 171/2 and two Class 171/4 sets were reformed back into their original three carriage formations, returned to Eversholt Rail Group and leased to East Midlands Railway (EMR). Three moved to EMR where they will be converted back to Class 170s while the fourth will remain on sub-lease with Southern. Further reshuffling resulted in Southern having a fleet of four two-carriage and 13 three-carriage sets by December 2022.

== Fleet details ==
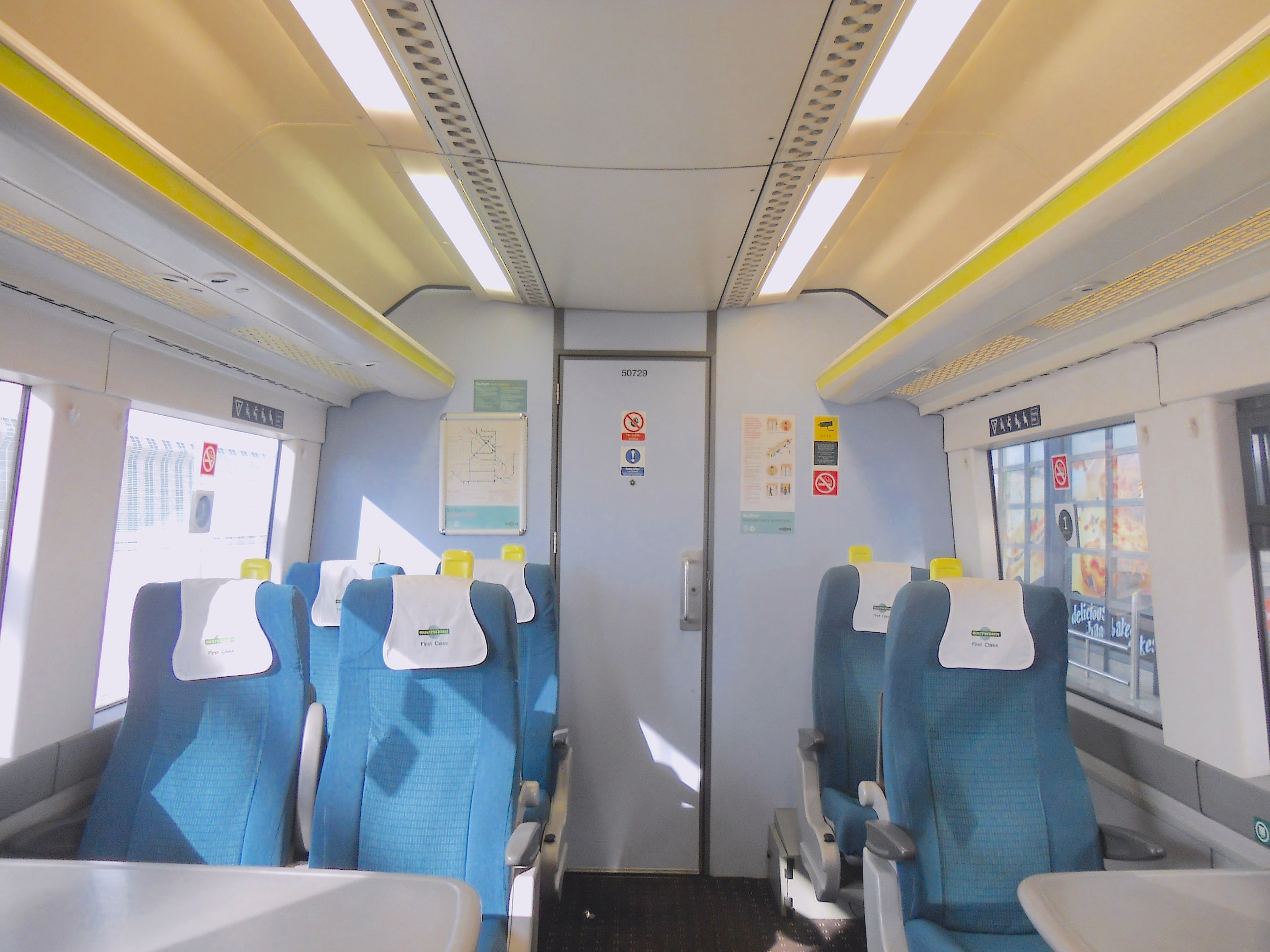
First Class section of a Class 171

Initial deliveries took place when the original two-car units, at the time classified as Class 170/7, entered service in 2003, followed by the four-car Class 171/8 units in 2004. At this time, the two-car sets received their Dellner couplings and were reclassified as Class 171/7. In 2015, four three-car Class 170/4 units were transferred to Southern from First ScotRail to enhance the fleet; two of these had the centre car removed and added to the remaining two, to form a pair of two-car and a pair of four-car units. With the addition of Dellner couplings, the new units were reclassified as Class 171/2 and 171/4.

In September 2022, 171202, 171401 and 171402 were transferred to East Midlands Railway and renumbered to 170422, 170423 and 170424.

Formation of two-car Class 171/7: DMOCL(W) + DMOSL
Formation of four-car Class 171/8: DMOCL(W) + MOS + MOS + DMOCL

Class	Operator	Qty.	Year built	Cars per unit	Unit nos.	Notes
171/2	Southern	1	1999-2001	3	171201	Converted from a former First ScotRail Class 170 unit in 2016.
171/7	Southern	4	2003-04	2	171727 - 171730	171730 formerly 170392
171/8	Southern	12	2003-04	3	171801 - 171812	Units 171801–171806 were originally four-car units, but as of December 2022, each of them lost one intermediate vehicle that was inserted into each of originally two-car units 171721–171726 to form units 171807–171812
