= Oxted railway station =

Commuter train station in Surrey, England

Coordinates: 51.258°N 0.005°W

Oxted
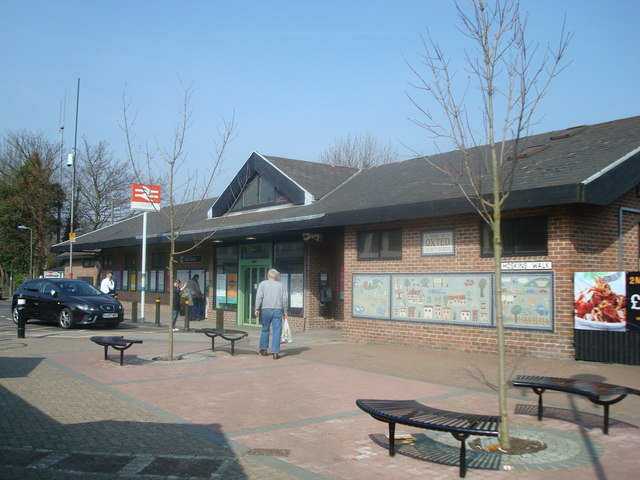

General information
- Location: Oxted, District of Tandridge; England
- Grid reference: TQ393528
- Manager: Southern
- Platforms: 3

Other information
- Station code: OXT
- Classification: DfT category C2

Key dates
- 10 March 1884: opened

Passengers
- 2020/21: ▼0.445 million
- 2021/22: ▲0.973 million
- 2022/23: ▲1.128 million
- 2023/24: ▲1.228 million
- 2024/25: ▲1.336 million
Location
Notes
- Passenger statistics from the Office of Rail and Road

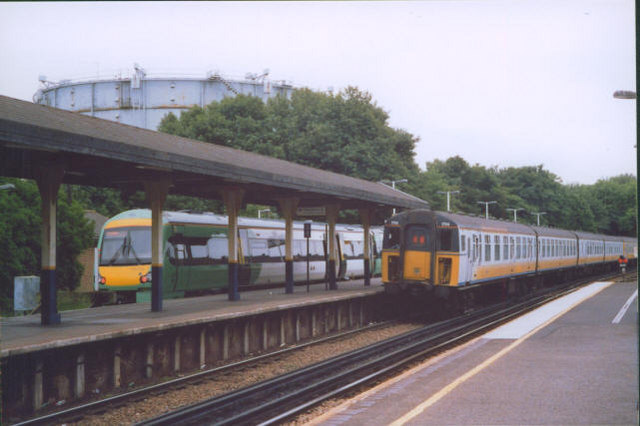
View of Oxted Station in 2004. Services shown are in both Southern and Connex South Central livery.

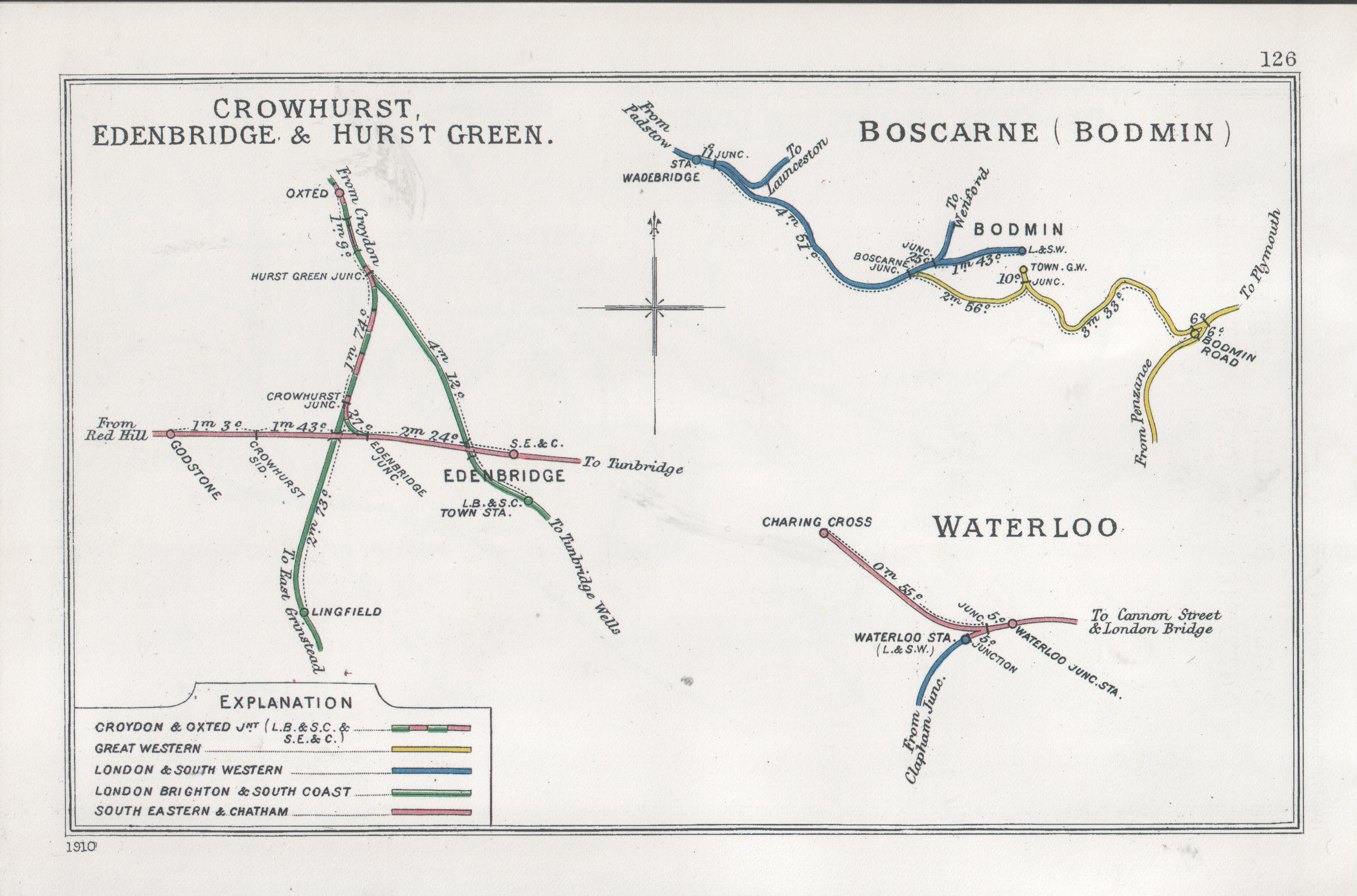
A 1910 Railway Clearing House map of lines around Oxted.

Oxted railway station is on the Oxted line in southern England, serving the commuter town of Oxted, Surrey. It is 20 miles 25 chains (20.31 miles, 32.69 km) from London Bridge. The station is managed by Southern who operate the majority of train services with a few peak services operated by Thameslink.

A relatively busy interchange station and terminus, rail services are operated by Southern and Thameslink. The station is the busiest suburban station on the line and is a terminus for some services on the Uckfield branch of the Oxted Line. Trains depart to London Victoria via Clapham Junction, London Bridge via East Croydon station, East Grinstead and Uckfield in East Sussex.

== History ==
Oxted was built as a joint London, Brighton and South Coast Railway/South Eastern Railway station when the South Croydon to East Grinstead line opened on 10 March 1884. The three platforms are connected by a subway which runs under the track. In addition, a lift is provided for entry to Platforms 2/3. There are tunnels at each end of the station:

- Oxted Tunnel 1 mile 23 chains (2.07 km) at the London end
- Limpsfield Tunnel 551 yard (501 m) at the country end

The station was the scene of a bomb attempt by suffragette sympathisers in 1913 – Harold Laski (later a professor at the London School of Economics and chairman of the Labour Party) and a friend placed the device in the men's toilets. Although it did detonate the damage was limited as the fuse failed to ignite the petrol contained in the device. A similar device (containing some pieces of metal and a watch in addition to the explosive charge) was planted at the Bank of England on 13 April 1913, which was successfully defused.

In 1951, the station had a train every thirteen minutes of the day, services running to Victoria and London Bridge in the up direction and to Tunbridge Wells, Eastbourne and Brighton in the down.

== Facilities ==
On the London-bound platform is a staffed ticket office (open daily until late). Two standard quick-pay self-service ticket machines in Southern branding are located outside the station on the London-bound side and at the entrance to the underpass on Platforms 2 and 3 side (Uckfield/East Grinstead bound.) The station is staffed 17 hours a day. The station accommodates a café, refurbished toilets, two waiting rooms and a line control centre in a large concourse.

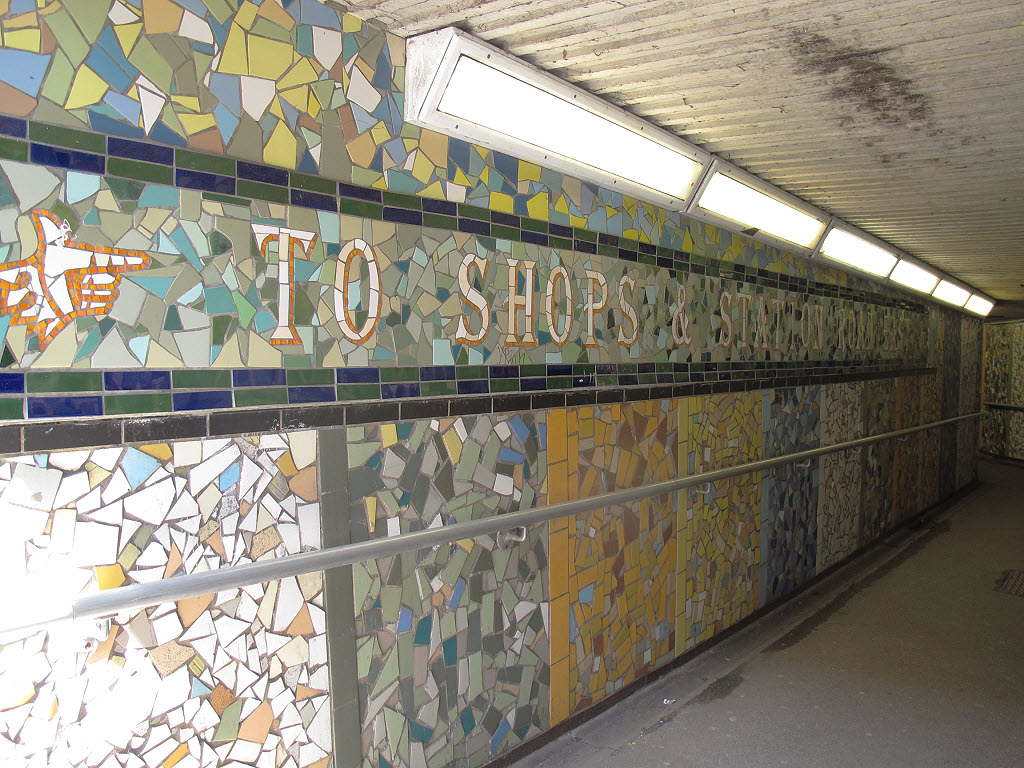
Station subway mosaic

All of the platforms are linked by a subway which also links the two main streets in Oxted together as well as the local supermarket and the town's leisure complex.

There is an underground car park located under the adjacent supermarket.

The station acts as a terminus for the Uckfield branch of the Oxted Line and trains use platform three on a regular basis after termination for both train maintenance and cleaning. The present signal box opened in the 1980s and covered control of the Uckfield line in January 1990. It replaced the previous original wooden structure located at the end of platform 2/3

The station was also the first station and terminus on the Southern network to receive two fully DDA-compliant ticket windows which will move down to accommodate easy use by wheelchair users. The station is also linked to the Southern Control Centre in Croydon, by two help points (one on each platform) where passengers can receive help 24 hours a day externally.

=== Layout ===
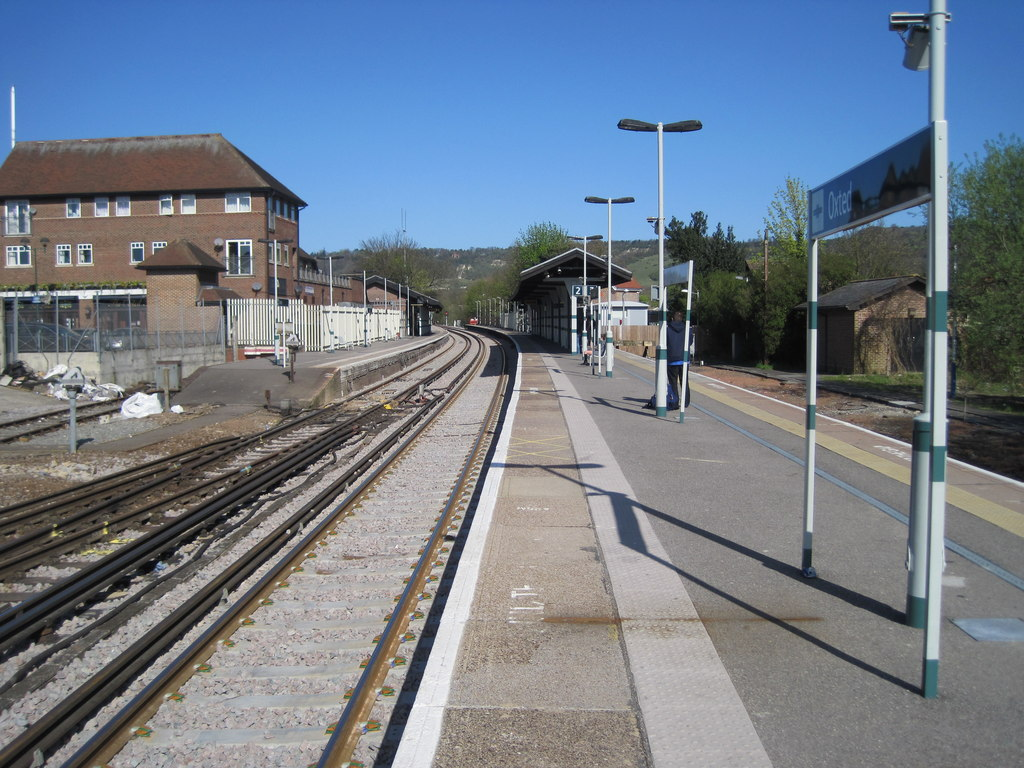
Oxted railway station looking north

Platform 1 is used by northbound trains towards East Croydon and London Victoria, London Bridge and London Blackfriars. It is also used for terminating services from Uckfield, which arrive here before performing an empty shunt movement to platform 3.

Platform 2 is used by most southbound trains towards East Grinstead and Uckfield. Rarely, it can also be used in periods of engineering work to reverse trains from London to reverse if the line is closed south of Oxted, using the crossover to the north of the station.

Platform 3 is a south-facing bay platform and is only used for Sunday services to Uckfield. It can only take 2-car trains.

== Improvements ==
In 2010 the station was refurbished and a new lift installed, followed by a deep clean and internal rezoning.

In May 2010, Platform 1 and 2 were lengthened by Balfour Beatty to take 12 car trains.

During January 2011, Southern installed ticket gates on the main concourse as well as the exit and indoor area in between platforms 2 and 3. Gate-line staff operate at the station also.

== Services ==
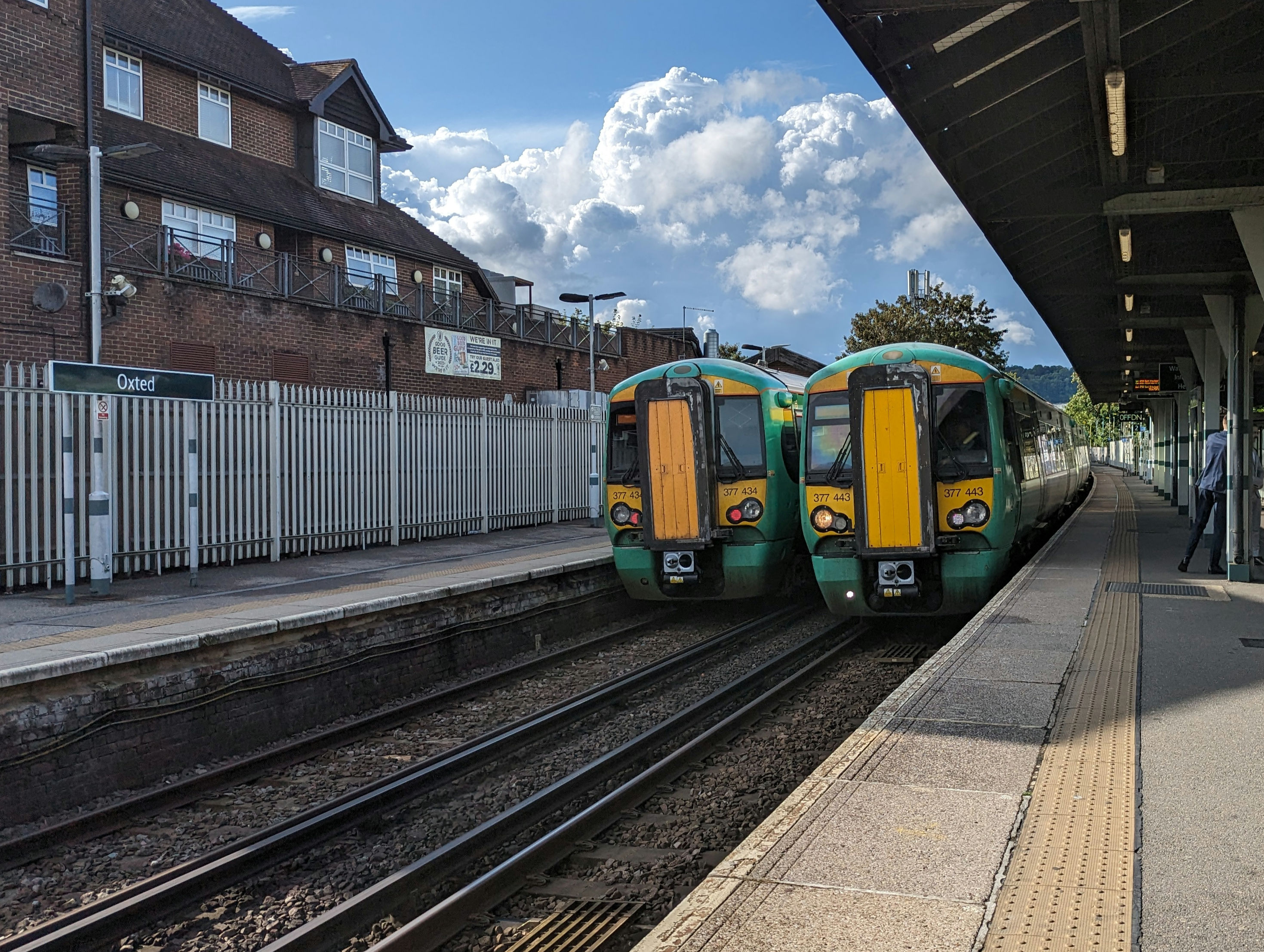
Southern trains at Oxted station

Off-peak, all services at Oxted are operated by Southern using Class 171 DMUs and Class 377 EMUs.

The typical off-peak service in trains per hour is:

- 1 tph to London Victoria (stopping)
- 1 tph to London Bridge (runs non-stop to East Croydon)
- 1 tph to East Grinstead
- 1 tph to Uckfield

During the peak hours and on weekends, the service between London Victoria and East Grinstead is increased to 2 tph.

In addition, there are also a number of peak hour Thameslink operated services between East Grinstead, London Bridge and Bedford, which are operated using Class 700 EMUs.

On Sundays, northbound services on the Uckfield branch terminate here, instead of continuing to London Bridge.

| Preceding station | National Rail | Following station |
|---|---|---|
| Woldingham | Southern Oxted Line East Grinstead Branch | Hurst Green |
| Woldingham | Thameslink Bedford to East Grinstead Peak Hours Only | Hurst Green |
| East Croydon | Southern Oxted Line Uckfield Branch | Hurst Green |
| Terminus | Southern Oxted Line Uckfield Branch | Hurst Green |

== Connections ==
Metrobus routes 236, 410, 594 and 595 serve the station, providing connections to Redhill, Godstone, Westerham, Edenbridge, Lingfield and East Grinstead.

== Sources ==
- Gould, David (2003). The Croydon, Oxted & East Grinstead Railway. Usk: Oakwood Press. ISBN 0-85361-598-5.
- McDermott, Frederick (2007) [1887]. The Life and Work of Joseph Firbank, Railway Contractor. London: Longmans Green. ISBN 978-1-4326-7748-0.
- Mitchell, Vic; Smith, Keith (1984). Branch lines to East Grinstead. Midhurst: Middleton Press. ISBN 0-90652-007-X.
