= Oxted line =

Railway line in southern England

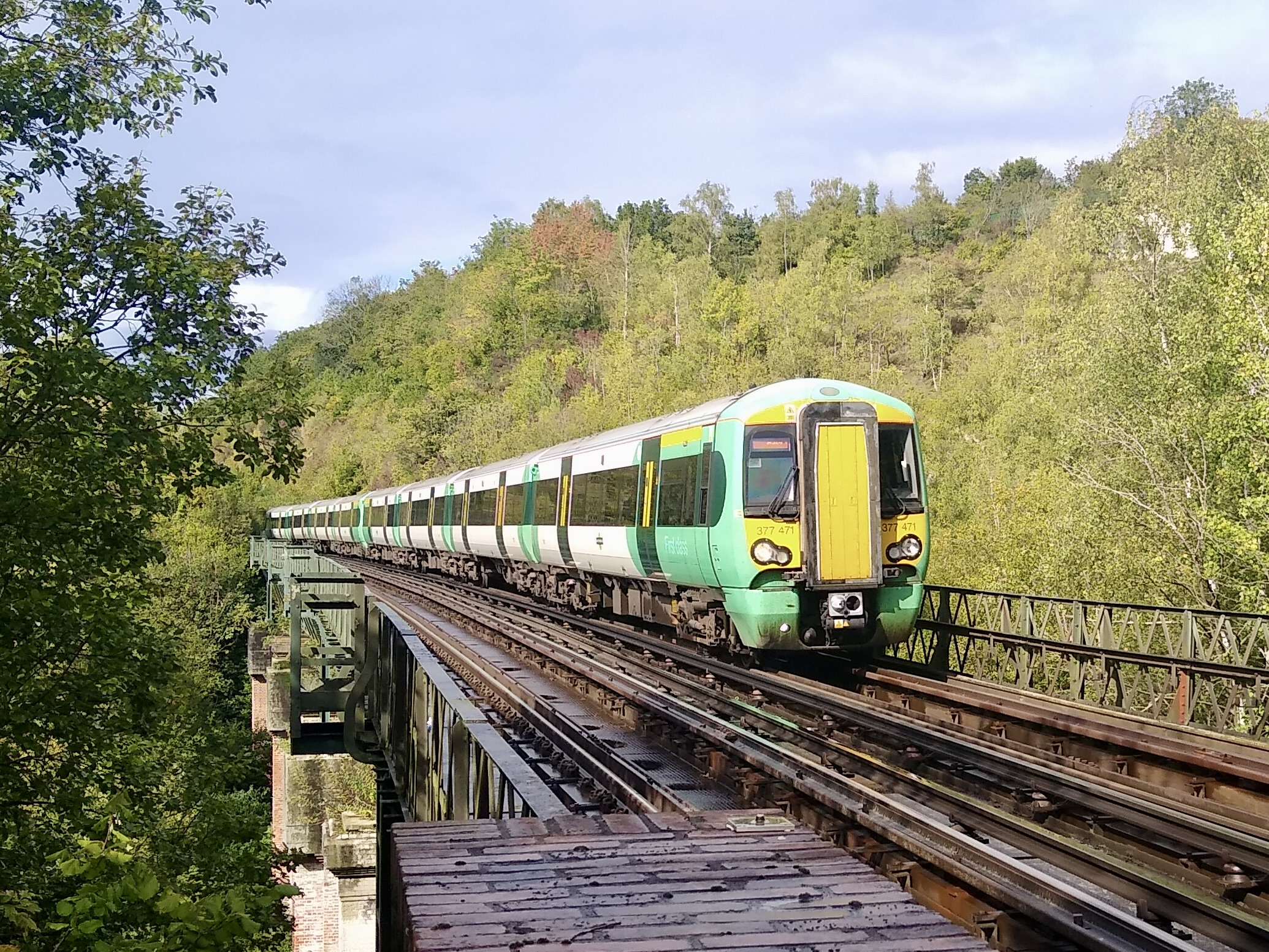
- Southern Class 377 units crossing Riddlesdown Viaduct with a service to East Grinstead

Overview
- Status: Operational
- Owner: Network Rail
- Locale: Greater London, Surrey, West Sussex, Kent, East Sussex
- Termini: South Croydon; East Grinstead / Uckfield

Service
- Type: Commuter rail
- System: National Rail
- Operator(s): Southern, Thameslink
- Rolling stock: Class 171, Class 377, Class 700

History
- Opened: 1868–1888

Technical
- Line length: 42 mi 79 ch (69.2 km)
- Track gauge: 1,435 mm (4 ft 8 1/2 in) standard gauge
- Electrification: 750 V DC third rail (South Croydon–East Grinstead); None (Hurst Green Junction–Uckfield)
Route map
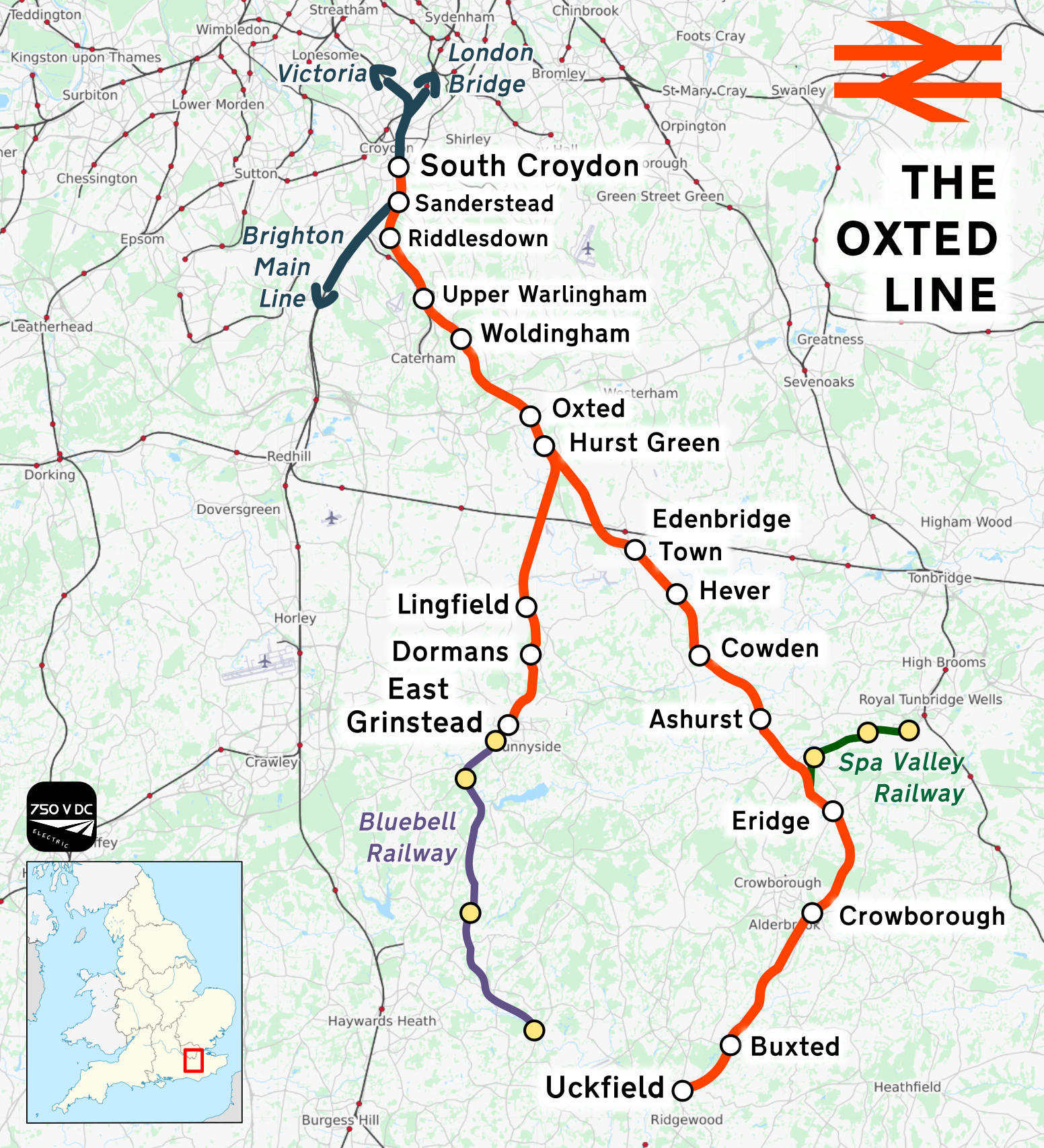

The Oxted line is a railway line in southern England. It runs from the Brighton Main Line at South Croydon in Greater London to Hurst Green Junction in Surrey, where its two branches diverge. The western branch continues via Lingfield to East Grinstead in West Sussex, whereas the eastern branch runs via Edenbridge Town in Kent to Uckfield in East Sussex. The line is named after the town of Oxted in Surrey and also serves parts of the London Borough of Croydon. The 18-mile-26-chain (29.5 km) South Croydon–East Grinstead section is electrified using the 750 V DC third-rail system and is double track throughout. The unelectrified Hurst Green Junction–Uckfield section is 24 mi 53 ch (39.7 km) in length and, south of Hever, is mostly single track.

Most trains on the Oxted line are operated by Southern, although Thameslink services also run to-and-from East Grinstead at peak times. During off-peak periods on weekdays, there is a half-hourly service between London Victoria and East Grinstead, and an hourly service between London Bridge and Uckfield. Services operated by Class 377 electric multiple units generally call at all stations between Sanderstead and East Grinstead; services operated by Class 171 diesel multiple units call at all stations between Oxted and Uckfield, but generally run non-stop between East Croydon and Oxted.

The first part of the route to be completed, between Eridge and Uckfield, was opened by the London, Brighton and South Coast Railway (LB&SCR) in August 1868. Although construction work was also carried out on the northern part of the Oxted line, the unfinished track bed was abandoned in 1869. In 1878, Parliament authorised the South Croydon–East Grinstead line, part of which would be built as a joint venture between the LB&SCR and the South Eastern Railway called the Croydon and Oxted Joint Railway. The first trains between London and East Grinstead via Oxted ran in March 1884. Four years later, in 1888, the Oxted line was completed with the opening of the section between Hurst Green Junction and Eridge.

Until the mid-20th century, trains were able to continue from both southern termini to Lewes. Passenger services were permanently withdrawn from the East Grinstead–Lewes section in March 1958 and from the Uckfield–Lewes section in May 1969. Steam haulage on the Oxted line was replaced by diesel traction in 1965 and the electrification of the South Croydon–East Grinstead section was completed in 1987. Much of the line between Hever and Uckfield was converted to single track in 1990. The Cowden rail crash occurred on 15 October 1994, when two trains collided on a section of single line that had previously been double track.

== Route ==
=== Overview ===
The Oxted line is a railway line in southern England. It links central London and the borough of Croydon with the towns of Oxted, East Grinstead, Edenbridge, Crowborough and Uckfield. The route passes through the counties of Greater London, Surrey, Kent, East Sussex and West Sussex. Four stations are in the London fare zones: South Croydon station is in Zone 5; Sanderstead, Riddlesdown and Upper Warlingham are in Zone 6. The name "Oxted Line" was first used in 1989 by Network SouthEast, the then operator of the route.

The Oxted line diverges from the Brighton Main Line at South Croydon Junction, immediately to the south of South Croydon station, and climbs along the eastern side of the Caterham valley, initially parallel to the Caterham line. At Hurst Green Junction, south of Hurst Green station, the line splits into two, with an electrified branch running to East Grinstead and an unelectrified branch running to Uckfield. Both routes previously continued south beyond their current termini to Lewes, but these lines were closed in the mid-20th century. Although the South Croydon–East Grinstead section is double track throughout, the Uckfield branch was mostly converted to single track south of Hever in 1990.

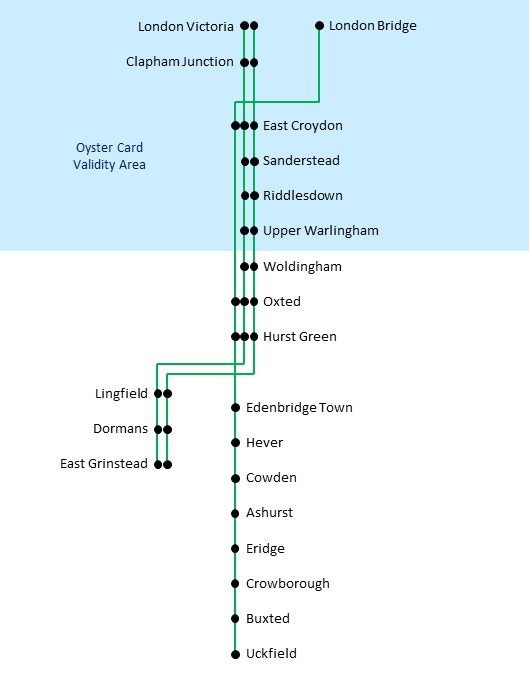
Hourly off-peak service pattern

Three distinct services operate on the Oxted line:

- London Victoria–East Grinstead operated by Southern using Class 377 electric multiple units;
- London Bridge–Uckfield operated by Southern using Class 171 diesel multiple units;
- Thameslink services to-and-from East Grinstead during weekday peak hours only, operated by Class 700 electric multiple units.

With the exception of the Thameslink services, Oxted line trains do not call at South Croydon. North of East Croydon, trains to London Victoria call only at Clapham Junction, whereas those operated by Class 171 and 700 units run fast to London Bridge. In general, trains to-and-from Uckfield do not call at Sanderstead, Riddlesdown, Upper Warlingham and Woldingham.

=== South Croydon–East Grinstead ===
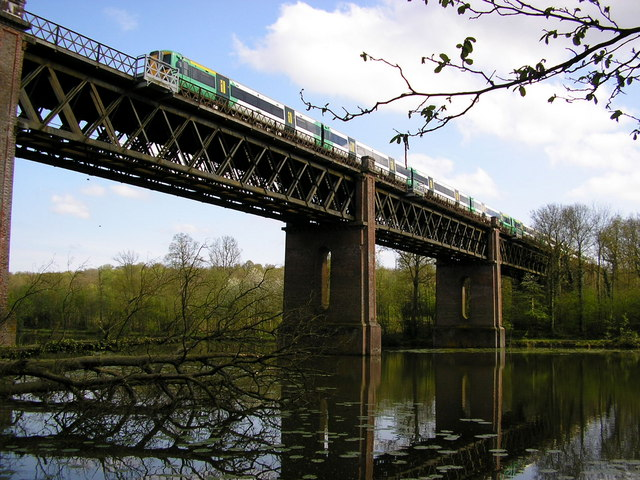
A Class 377 unit crosses Cooks Pond Viaduct between Dormans and East Grinstead.

The South Croydon–East Grinstead section of the Oxted line is 18 mi 26 ch (29.5 km) in length and has 10 stations in total. South Croydon station has five platforms, of which only three are accessible for Oxted Line trains; Oxted station has three platforms, one of which is a south-facing bay; all other stations (Sanderstead, Riddlesdown, Upper Warlingham, Woldingham, Hurst Green, Lingfield, Dormans and East Grinstead) have two platforms each. All stations are managed by Southern. This section of the line serves Lingfield Park Racecourse, around 1/4 mi (0.40 km) from Lingfield station, and interchange is available with the Bluebell Railway, a heritage railway, at East Grinstead.

The South Croydon–East Grinstead section of the Oxted line is electrified using the 750 V DC third-rail system and is double track throughout. North of Upper Warlingham, the signalling is controlled by Three Bridges Area Signalling Centre, but the rest of the line is controlled from Oxted Signal Box. The maximum line speed is 85 mph (137 km/h) and trains typically reach East Croydon from East Grinstead in around 35–40 minutes. The maximum gradient on this section is 1 in 67, south of Dormans. The summit of the line is on the north side of Oxted Tunnel, the longest on the line at 1 mi 501 yd (2.067 km). There are two other tunnels: the 837 yd (765 m) Riddlesdown Tunnel and the 565 yd (517 m) Limpsfield Tunnel. There are four viaducts on the South Croydon–East Grinstead section at Riddlesdown, Warlingham, Oxted and Cooks Pond (near Dormans). Between Hurst Green and Lingfield, the line passes beneath the Redhill–Tonbridge line, although the Crowhurst spur connecting the two was closed in 1965.

Stations on the South Croydon–East Grinstead section (ordered from north to south)
| Station | Distance from London Victoria via East Croydon | Number of platforms | Opening date | Original name | Ref. |
|---|---|---|---|---|---|
| South Croydon | 11 mi 21 ch (18.1 km) | 5 (3 for Oxted line) | 2 January 1865 | | |
| Sanderstead | 12 mi 23 ch (19.8 km) | 2 | 10 March 1884 | | |
| Riddlesdown | 13 mi 38 ch (21.7 km) | 2 | 5 June 1927 | | |
| Upper Warlingham | 15 mi 33 ch (24.8 km) | 2 | 10 March 1884 | Warlingham | |
| Woldingham | 17 mi 15 ch (27.7 km) | 2 | 11 June 1885 | Marden Park | |
| Oxted | 20 mi 25 ch (32.7 km) | 3 | 10 March 1884 | | |
| Hurst Green | 21 mi 20 ch (34.2 km) | 2 | 1 June 1907 (relocated 12 June 1961) | Hurst Green Halt | |
| Lingfield | 26 mi 23 ch (42.3 km) | 2 | 10 March 1884 | | |
| Dormans | 27 mi 62 ch (44.7 km) | 2 | 10 March 1884 | | |
| East Grinstead | 30 mi 04 ch (48.4 km) | 2 | 1 August 1882 | East Grinstead Low Level | |

=== Hurst Green Junction–Uckfield ===
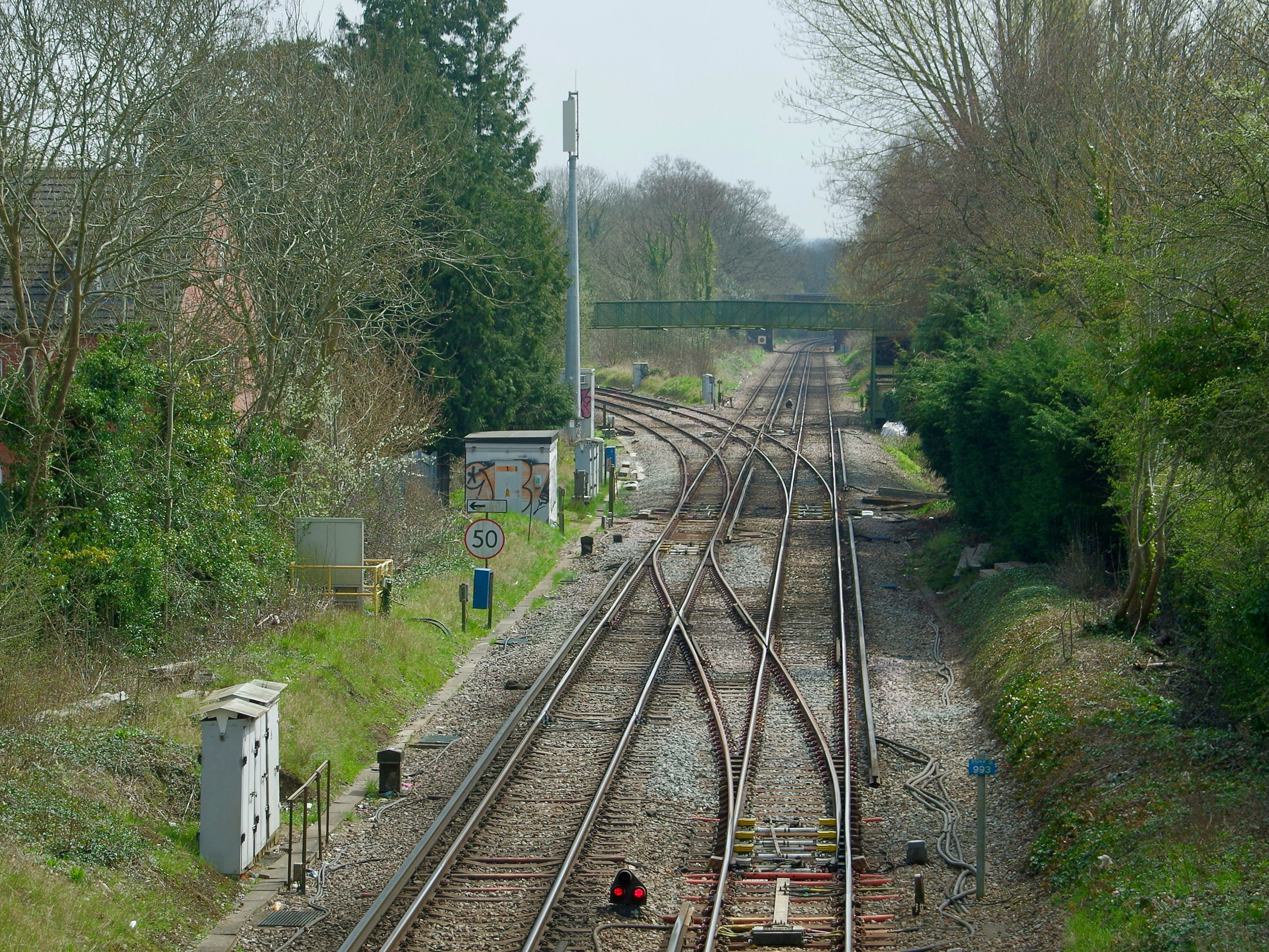
Hurst Green Junction: The unelectrified branch to Uckfield diverges to the left and the electrified line to East Grinstead continues ahead.

The Hurst Green Junction–Uckfield section is 24 mi 53 ch (39.7 km) in length and has eight stations in total. Eridge station has three platforms, of which one is used by the Oxted line and the other two by the Spa Valley Railway. Edenbridge Town, Hever, Ashurst and Crowborough stations have two platforms each; the remaining three stations (Cowden, Buxted and Uckfield) have a single platform. All stations are managed by Southern and passenger services are operated using Class 171 diesel multiple units.

This part of the Oxted line is unelectrified and signalling is controlled from Oxted Signal Box. North of Hever is double track, but to the south the line has been singled, although trains may pass at Ashurst and Crowborough stations. The maximum speed is 70 mph (110 km/h) and trains typically reach Hurst Green from Uckfield in around 40 minutes. The steepest gradient, 1 in 66, is at Burnt Oak Bridge, to the north of Buxted. There are three tunnels on the Hurst Green Junction–Uckfield section of the line. The double-track Edenbridge Tunnel (sometimes known as Little Browns Tunnel) is 319 yd (292 m) long and opens out in the middle to allow the Redhill–Tonbridge line to cross over on a bridge. (Note: An out-of-station interchange is available between Edenbridge Town station (on the Uckfield branch of the Oxted line) and Edenbridge station (on the Redhill–Tonbridge line), but there is a distance of 1 mi (1.4 km) between the two.) The other two tunnels are the 1,341 yd (1,226 m) Mark Beech Tunnel (built for double track but containing only a single track) and the 1,022 yd (935 m) Crowborough Tunnel.

Stations on the Hurst Green Junction–Uckfield section (ordered from north to south)
| Station | Distance from London Victoria via East Croydon | Number of platforms | Opening date | Original name | Ref. |
|---|---|---|---|---|---|
| Edenbridge Town | 25 mi 47 ch (41.2 km) | 2 | 2 January 1888 | Edenbridge | |
| Hever | 27 mi 27 ch (44.0 km) | 2 | 1 October 1888 | | |
| Cowden | 29 mi 26 ch (47.2 km) | 1 | 1 October 1888 | | |
| Ashurst | 32 mi 08 ch (51.7 km) | 2 | 1 October 1888 | | |
| Eridge | 35 mi 53 ch (57.4 km) | 3 (1 for Oxted line) | 3 August 1868 | | |
| Crowborough | 39 mi 11 ch (63.0 km) | 2 | 3 August 1868 | Rotherfield | |
| Buxted | 43 mi 68 ch (70.6 km) | 1 | 3 August 1868 | | |
| Uckfield | 46 mi 08 ch (74.2 km) | 1 | 18 October 1858 (relocated 13 May 1991) | | |

== History ==
=== 1860s ===
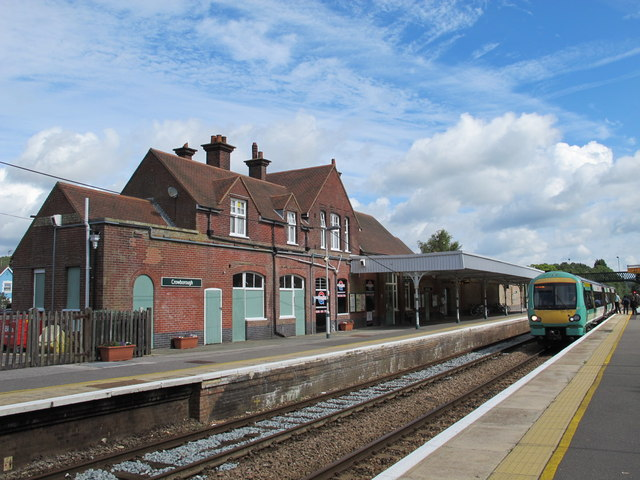
Crowborough station opened as "Rotherfield" on 3 August 1868.

The first part of the Oxted line to be completed was the section from Eridge to Uckfield. It was built to join the existing East Grinstead–Tunbridge Wells line at Groombridge (opened on 1 October 1866) to the Uckfield–Lewes line (opened on 11 October 1858). It was proposed by the Brighton, Uckfield & Tunbridge Wells Railway and was supported by the London, Brighton and South Coast Railway (LB&SCR), which owned the other two lines. The new link not only enabled trains from east Kent to reach Brighton, but was also intended to block a rival scheme from the London, Chatham and Dover Railway, which would have followed a similar route.

Brighton, Uckfield and Tunbridge Wells Railway Act 1861
- Act of Parliament
- Parliament of the United Kingdom
- Long title: An Act for making a Railway from the London, Brighton, and South Coast Railway at Uckfield in the County of Sussex to Tunbridge Wells in the County of Kent, and for other Purposes.
- Citation: 24 & 25 Vict. c. clxxiv

Dates
- Royal assent: 22 July 1861

The Brighton, Uckfield and Tunbridge Wells Railway was authorised by the Brighton, Uckfield and Tunbridge Wells Railway Act 1861 (24 & 25 Vict. c. clxxiv) and construction had begun by 1863. The LB&SCR purchased the line before completion and opened the section from Groombridge to Uckfield on 3 August 1868. The railway was initially built with a single track, although the bridges and Crowborough Tunnel were engineered to allow a second to be laid at a later date. The first passing loop was installed at Crowborough in 1879 and doubling from Eridge to Uckfield was completed in 1894.

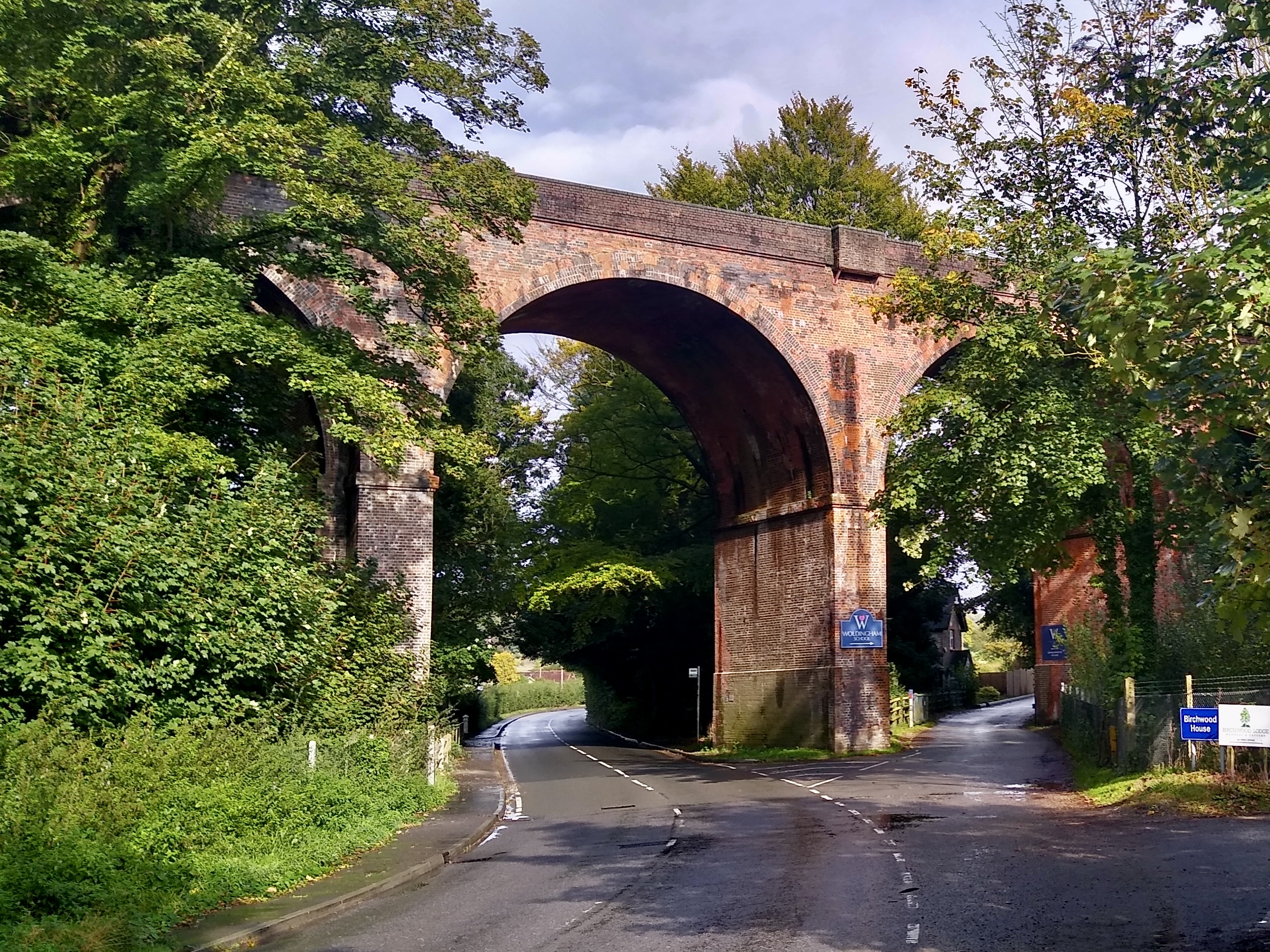
Woldingham Viaduct, completed by the SSJR before work was halted by the LB&SCR in 1869

The LB&SCR also supported the Surrey and Sussex Junction Railway (SSJR), which proposed a line linking the Brighton Main Line at South Croydon to the East Grinstead–Tunbridge Wells line at Groombridge. The new line was authorised by the Surrey and Sussex Junction Railway Act on 6 July 1865. Work began the following year, but progress was slow due to the financial panic of 1866 caused by the failure of Overend, Gurney and Company. In 1869, there was a riot at Edenbridge in opposition to the Belgian navvies who were being employed in preference to local labourers.

The London, Brighton and South Coast and Surrey and Sussex Junction Railway Companies' Amalgamation Act 1869 (32 & 33 Vict. c. lxxii) allowed the LB&SCR to acquire the partially built SSJR line in July 1896. Construction of the SSJR ceased immediately and the LB&SCR paid a fine of £32,250 (equivalent to £3.32 million in 2025) to allow it to abandon the project. By the time the works were halted, the viaduct at Woldingham had been completed and substantial progress had been made on the tunnels at Riddlesdown, Oxted and Limpsfield. Nevertheless, the LB&SCR estimated that a further £1.5–£2 million (£150–£210 million in 2025) would be required to finish the line.

=== 1870s and 1880s ===
London, Brighton, and South Coast Railway (Croydon, Oxted, and East Grinstead Railways) Act 1878
- Act of Parliament
- Parliament of the United Kingdom
- Long title: An Act to enable the London, Brighton, and South Coast Railway Company to complete and construct Railways between Croydon, Oxted, and East Grinstead, and to acquire the Lewes and East Grinstead Railway; to confer powers on the South-eastern Railway Company; and for other purposes.
- Citation: 41 & 42 Vict. c. lxxii

Dates
- Royal assent: 17 June 1878

Text of statute as originally enacted

Under the London, Brighton, and South Coast Railway (Croydon, Oxted, and East Grinstead Railways) Act 1878 (41 & 42 Vict. c. lxxii), the northern part of the SSJR scheme was resurrected. The act authorised the construction of a double track railway from South Croydon to East Grinstead. The line was to use the partially built track bed as far south as Limpsfield Tunnel, from where it would continue to meet the Lewes and East Grinstead Railway, authorised the previous August. The new line would be jointly owned and operated by the LB&SCR and South Eastern Railway (SER) between South Croydon and Crowhurst Junction, from where a spur would lead to the SER Redhill–Tonbridge line. The section south of Crowhurst Junction to East Grinstead would be solely owned by the LB&SCR.

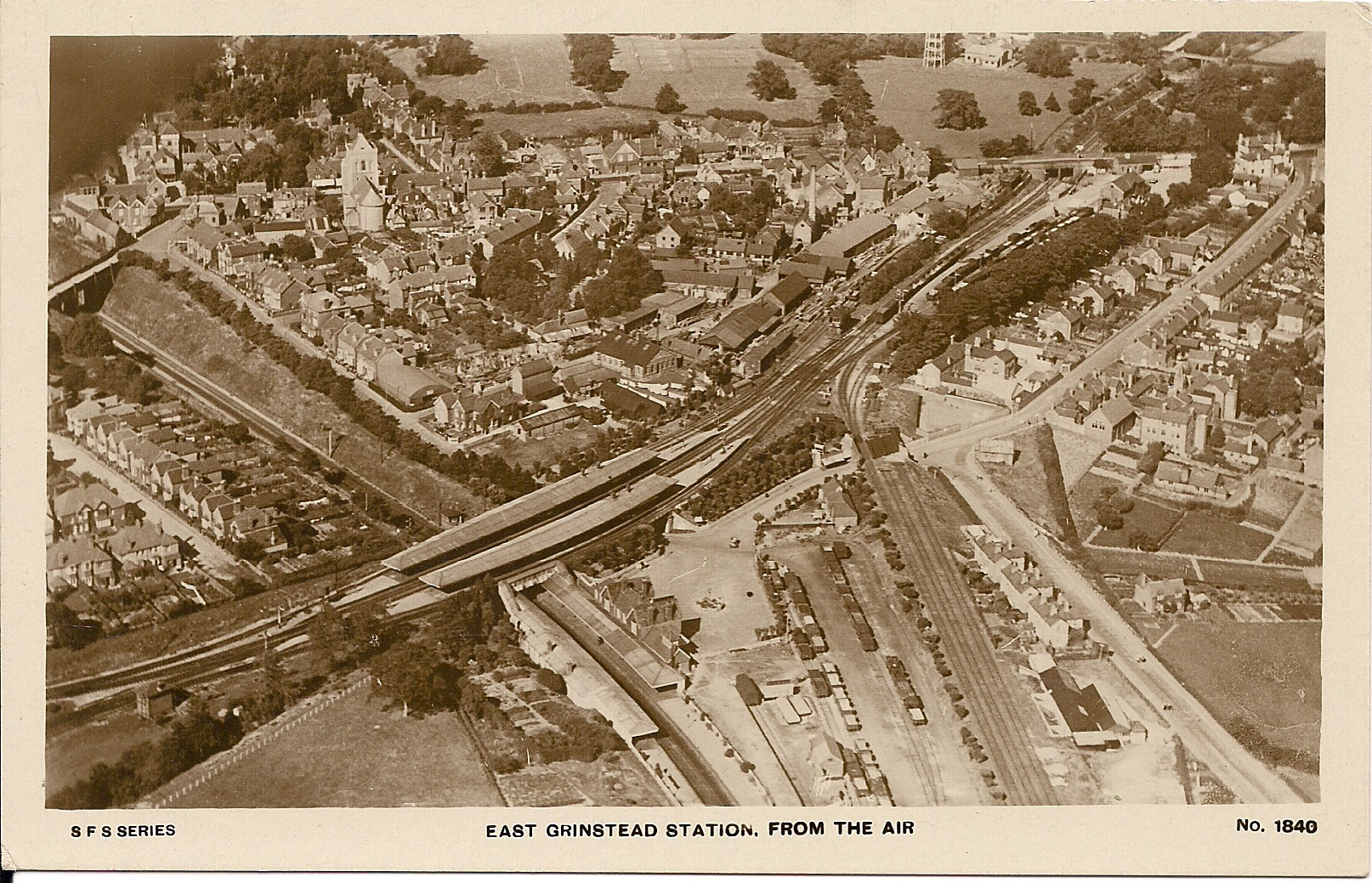
East Grinstead station c. 1920: The "high level" platforms on the Three Bridges–Tunbridge Wells line (lower left to top right) cross the "low level" platforms on the Oxted line (upper left to bottom centre).

Work on the new line began in 1881. Under the terms of their ownership agreement, the SER was responsible for providing stations at Upper Warlingham and Oxted, while the LB&SCR built those at Lingfield and Dormans. At East Grinstead, two new "low level" platforms were constructed below and at right angles to the "high level" station on the Three Bridges–Tunbridge Wells line. (Note: Trains to-and-from Oxted could access the high level station at East Grinstead via the St Margaret's Curve, constructed at the same time as the rest of the South Croydon–East Grinstead line. The low level platforms were used by most trains from Oxted, including those continuing to Lewes via Sheffield Park.)

The LB&SCR had hoped to open the South Croydon–East Grinstead line on 1 March 1884, but public services were delayed until 10 March for strengthening work on Riddlesdown Viaduct. The spur at Crowhurst was opened on 1 August, allowing the SER to run trains between Oxted and Tonbridge via Edenbridge. The first new station on the line was at Woldingham, which opened as "Marden Park" on 11 June 1885. The cost of building the station was part-funded by a local landowner.

Oxted and Groombridge Railway Act 1881
- Act of Parliament
- Parliament of the United Kingdom
- Long title: An Act for incorporating the Oxted and Groombridge Railway Company; and for other purposes.
- Citation: 44 & 45 Vict. c. clxxxix

Dates
- Royal assent: 11 August 1881

Text of statute as originally enacted

London, Brighton and South Coast Railway (Various Powers) Act 1884
- Act of Parliament
- Parliament of the United Kingdom
- Long title: An Act to confer further Powers on the London Brighton and South Coast Railway Company; to transfer to them the powers of the Oxted and Groombridge Railway Company; and for other purposes.
- Citation: 47 & 48 Vict. c. xcvii

Dates
- Royal assent: 3 July 1884

Text of statute as originally enacted

The final part of the Oxted line to be constructed was the Hurst Green Junction–Eridge section. It was proposed by the Oxted and Groombridge Railway (O&GR) company and was authorised by the Oxted and Groombridge Railway Act 1881 (44 & 45 Vict. c. clxxxix). Three years later, under the London, Brighton and South Coast Railway (Various Powers) Act 1884 (47 & 48 Vict. c. xcvii), the LB&SCR was authorised to acquire the O&GR. Points were laid at Hurst Green Junction on 14 November 1887 and the new line opened on 2 January the following year. As part of the works, a single track link, known as the Withyham Spur, was constructed to allow trains from Oxted to access Uckfield without a reversal at Groombridge. The link was primarily used for light locomotive and empty stock moves, and was not regularly used by passenger services until the First World War.

Two railways connecting to the Oxted line were completed in the 1880s. The first was the Eridge–Polegate line, commonly called the Cuckoo Line, which was opened in stages between 1849 and 1880. The second was the Woodside and South Croydon Joint Railway, opened on 2 January 1888. Built by the LB&SCR and SER, it ran from the Mid-Kent line at Elmers End to a junction with the Oxted line at Selsdon, a four-platform station serving both lines.

=== Late 19th and early 20th centuries ===
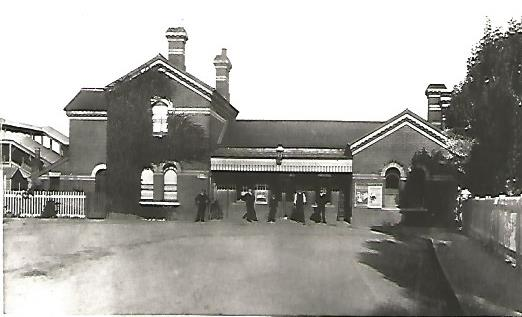
Lingfield station c. 1910

The arrival of the railway stimulated development in the Lingfield area of south-east Surrey in the late 19th century. Development at Dormans Park began in 1887 and, by 1891, a hotel and around 40 high-class "bungalow residences" had been built, set in grounds that included cricket and polo fields, a golf course and a fishing lake. Lingfield Park Racecourse, around 1/4 mi (0.40 km) from Lingfield station, opened in November 1890 and four years later, in May 1894, the station was enlarged with an additional bay platform for the use of racegoers. Sidings were added in 1898 to allow horses to be transported to the course and special trains ran on racedays until the 1970s.

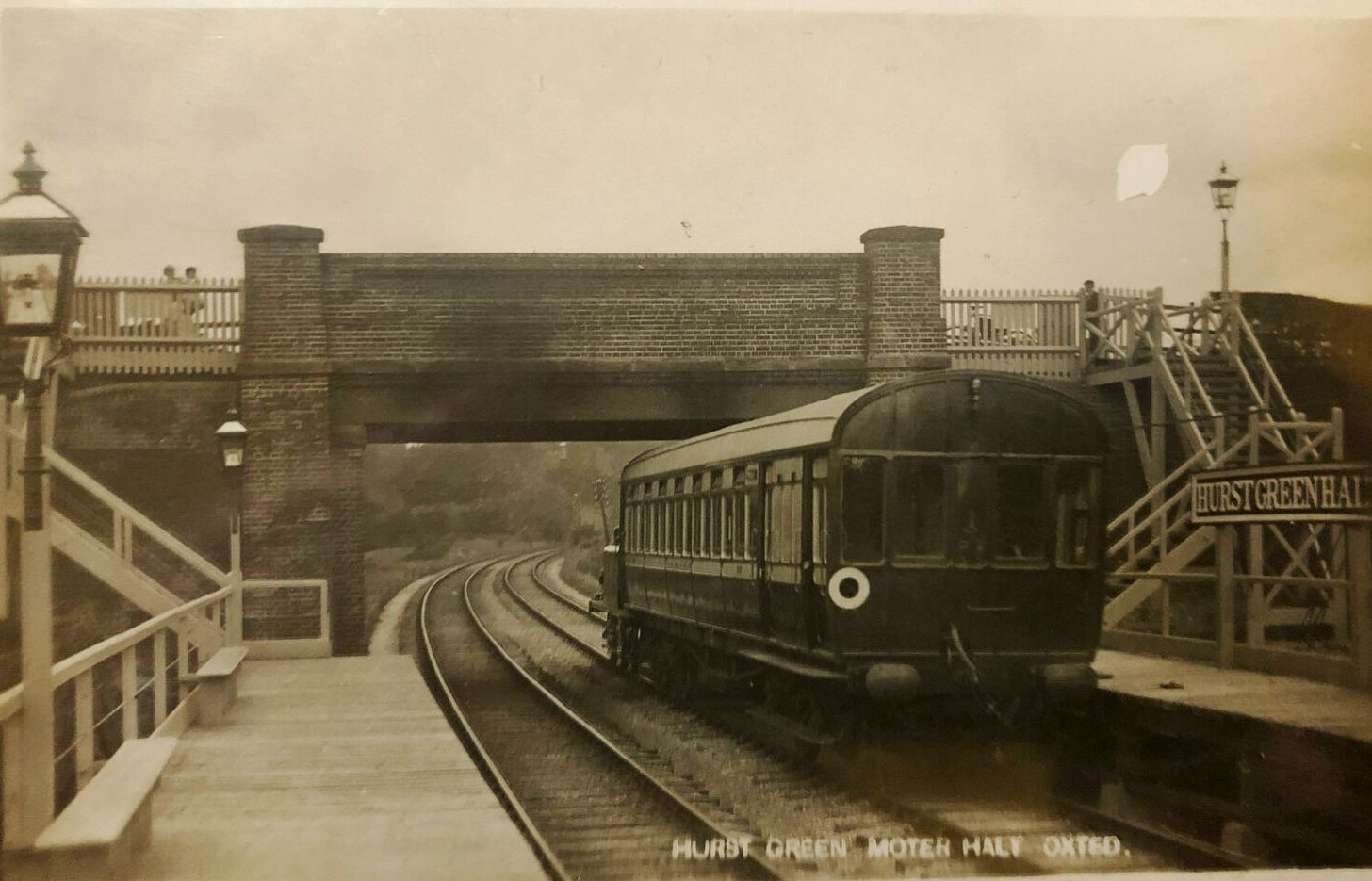
Hurst Green Halt c. 1910

Four new stations were constructed on the Oxted line in the early part of the 20th century. Hurst Green Halt and Monks Lane Halt, both between Oxted and Edenbridge Town, were opened on 1 July 1907. The latter was closed on 11 September 1939, but significant housing development in the Oxted area ensured the survival of the former. Purley Downs Golf Club Halt, which did not appear in public timetables, opened in 1914 between Sanderstead and Upper Warlingham. It had closed by 1927. Riddlesdown station opened on 5 June 1927, with the intention of stimulating housebuilding in the local area. Initially timber platform shelters were provided, but were replaced by brick structures in the 1950s.

Shortly before the start of the First World War, the Withyham spur was doubled, allowing regular passenger services from Uckfield to reach London via Oxted. The upgraded link also allowed troops to be transported to a new army camp that had been established at Crowborough. (Note: Following the end of the First World War, the army camp at Crowborough was used by the Royal Corps of Signals until its closure in August 1925.) Wartime economy measures affecting the line included the temporary withdrawal of passenger services on the Woodside and South Croydon line between January 1917 and March 1919. Trains on the Oxted line were disrupted on 22 April 1918 when an aircraft crashed on the tracks between Sanderstead and Upper Warlingham, and roof collapses occurred in Oxted Tunnel in both June 1917 and May 1919. A programme of repair was initiated involving a partial closure of the line between 7 February and 1 December 1921.

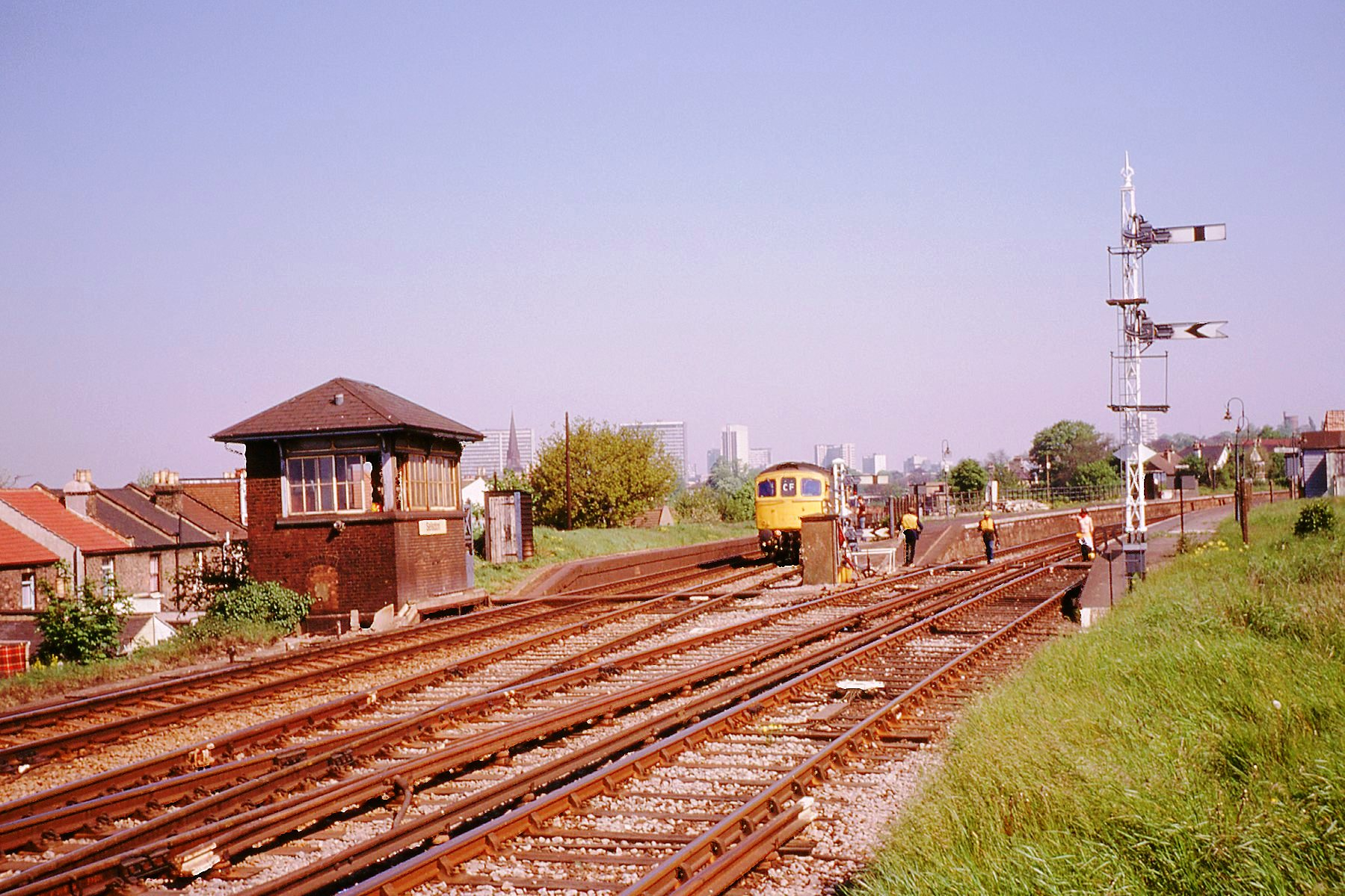
Selsdon station in 1980: The electrified lines to Elmers End are diverging to the right and the then unelectrified tracks to South Croydon are straight ahead. The short electrified section to Sanderstead is behind the camera to the left.

The first proposals to electrify the route, using overhead lines energised to 1,500 V DC, were put forward by the LB&SCR in the late 1910s and early 1920s. However, as a result of the Railways Act 1921, the Oxted line became part of the Southern Railway (SR) in 1923, which decided to implement the third-rail electrification system instead. The Oxted line was omitted from the schemes of the mid-1920s, which prioritised electrification work on other routes.

The first part of the Oxted line was electrified in the mid-1930s, when third rail was installed between Selsdon and Sanderstead stations for trains running via the Woodside and South Croydon line. Half-hourly electric services began operating between Charing Cross and Sanderstead via Elmers End on 30 September 1935. Electrification of the line from South Croydon to Horsted Keynes via East Grinstead was approved by the board of the SR in June 1939, but the project was postponed owing to the outbreak of the Second World War. In July 1946, the company announced that the work would be undertaken when sufficient labour and materials were available.

=== Nationalisation (1948–1996) ===
In October 1946, the SR announced that all former LB&SCR routes would be electrified by 1955, but two years later, the railways were nationalised. Under the Transport Act 1947, the Oxted line became part of the Southern Region of British Railways (BR). BR cancelled the SR's plans for the Oxted line, making an unfulfilled promise to electrify the route by 1964.

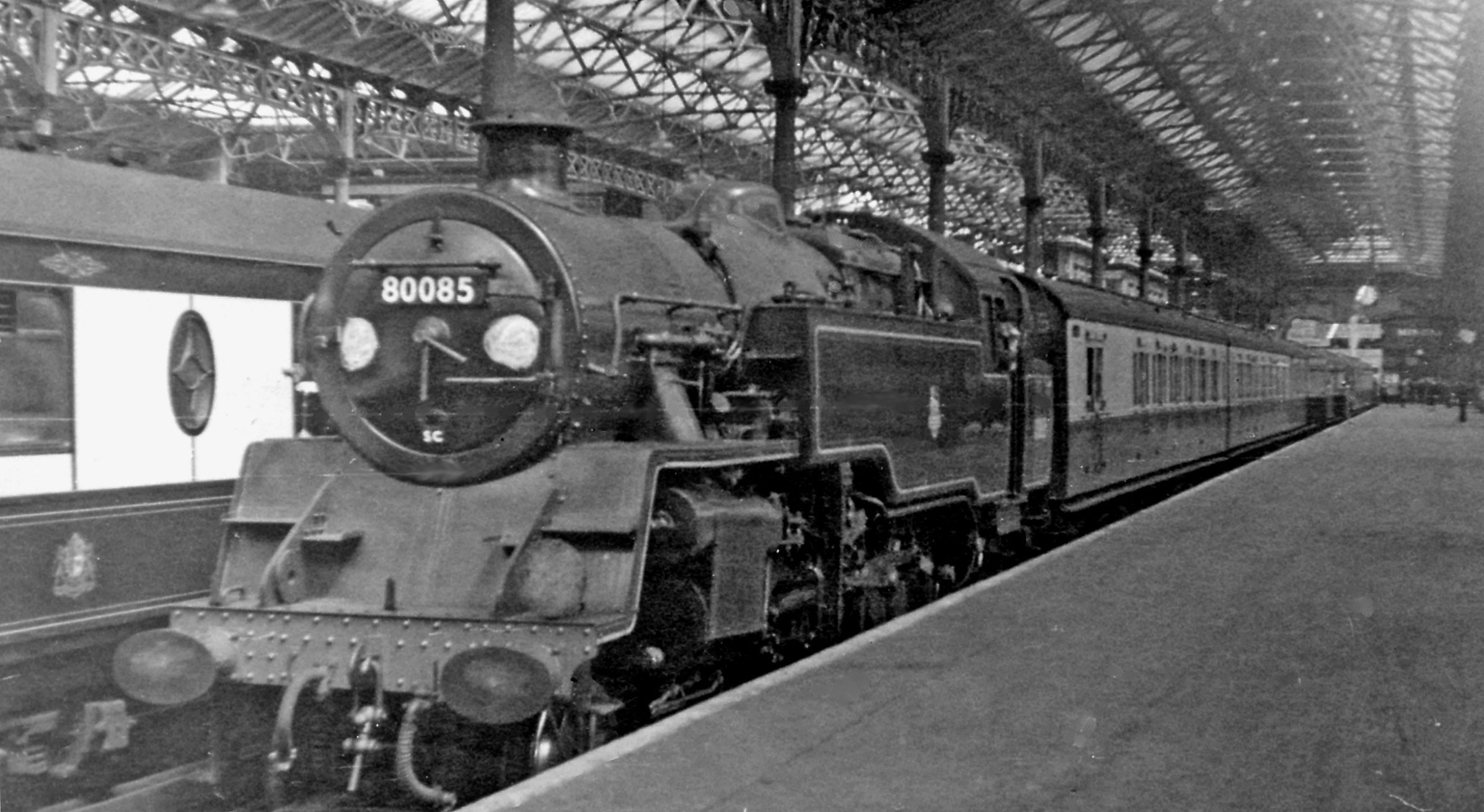
A British Railways Standard Class 4MT locomotive at London Victoria with a service to Brighton via Oxted and East Grinstead in 1954

The population of Oxted grew in the mid-1950s, with housing development south of the town centre. Work to expand and relocate Hurst Green Halt to better serve this area of development began in 1960. The replacement station, renamed simply "Hurst Green", opened on 12 June 1961. It was provided with 12-carriage platforms to enable East Grinstead trains to be split from or joined to those serving Uckfield, but instead these operations were carried out at Oxted.

Diesel multiple units were introduced to the Oxted line on 18 June 1962, when the first of nineteen Class 207 units, built specifically for the route, were introduced to peak-hour services. Steam-hauled passenger trains were withdrawn on 6 January 1964, but there were too few Class 207s to run the full timetable and so locomotive-hauled trains, operated by Class 33 diesels, were also used, especially at peak times. Additional capacity was introduced with the arrival of Class 205 units from 1970 onwards, although locomotive-hauled passenger trains continued to run until the mid-1980s.

BR began a programme of line closures in the 1950s. In mid-1955, the railway between East Grinstead and Lewes was shut, but following legal action it temporarily reopened in August the following year, before permanently closing on 17 March 1958. The Beeching report, published in March 1963, proposed the closure of several routes in Sussex and Kent, including the Three Bridges–Tunbridge Wells, Eridge–Tunbridge Wells and Eridge–Polegate lines. The railway between Crowborough and Lewes via Uckfield was also to be closed and passenger services between Woodside and Selsdon were to be withdrawn. The first to be shut was the Eridge–Hailsham section of the Cuckoo Line on 14 June 1965, followed by the Three Bridges–Ashurst Junction line on 2 January 1967. Following local campaigns, the other routes were given a reprieve, with the exception of the Uckfield–Lewes line, which closed in May 1969.

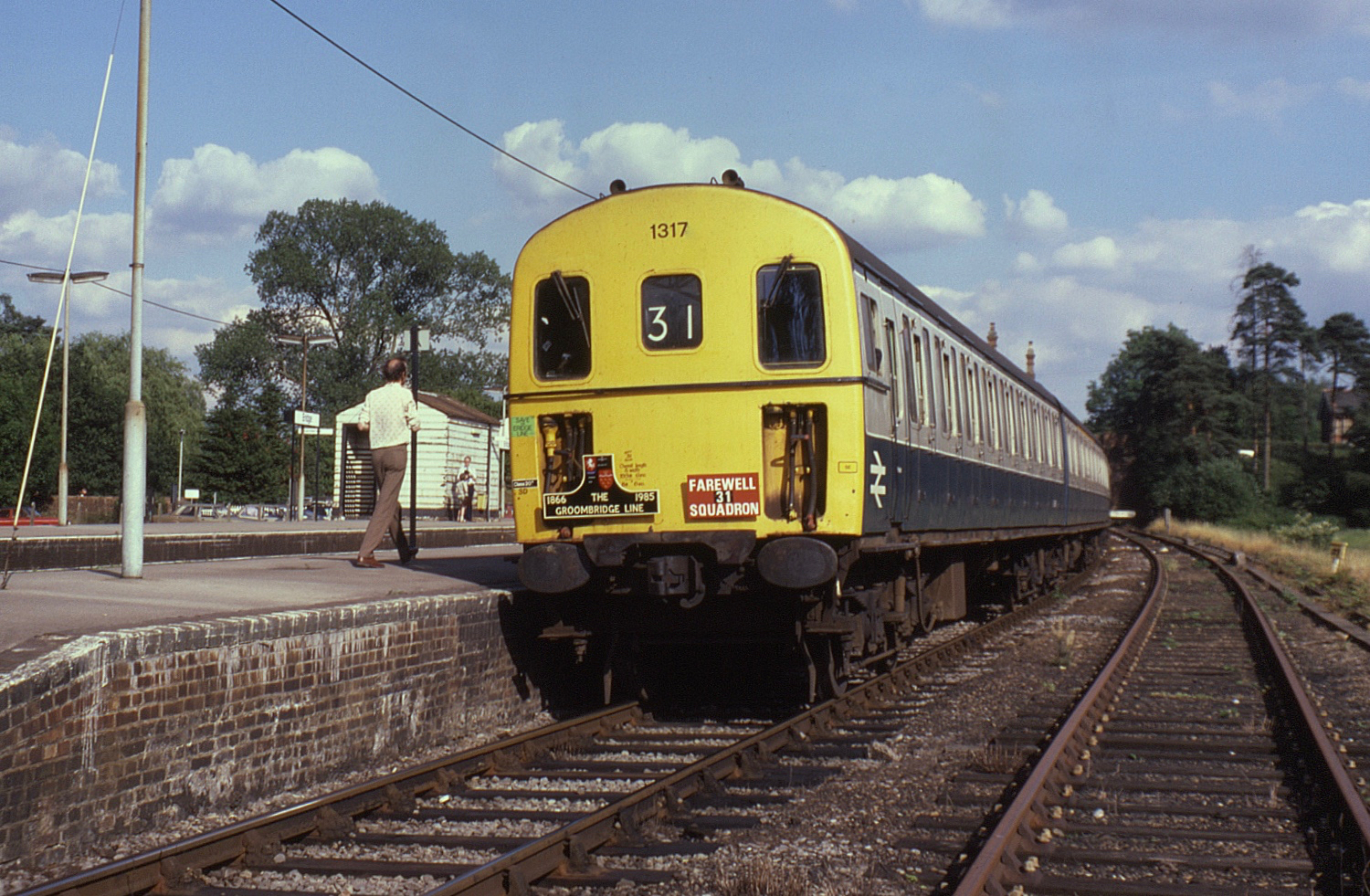
A Class 207 unit on 6 July 1985, the final day of service between Eridge and Tunbridge Wells

Two further line closures took place in the early 1980s. The electrified line between Woodside and Selsdon closed on 13 May 1983; the track bed north of Coombe Road station would be used in the 1990s for Tramlink. (Note: The Oxted line platforms at Selsdon had closed on 14 June 1959, but the platforms on the Woodside and South Croydon line remained open until the line closure on 13 May 1983.) The withdrawal of passenger services on the line between Eridge and Tunbridge Wells was announced in September 1982, although trains continued to operate until 6 July 1985. Since December 1996, part of the track bed has been used for the Spa Valley Railway. Although the Hurst Green Junction–Uckfield section of the Oxted line was not threatened with closure again, Sunday services were withdrawn in June 1981. From 1982, the railways in Surrey, Kent and Sussex came under the control of the London and South East sector of BR, which was rebranded to Network SouthEast in June 1986. As part of an initiative to provide passenger routes with individual identities, Network SouthEast introduced the name "Oxted Line" in 1989.

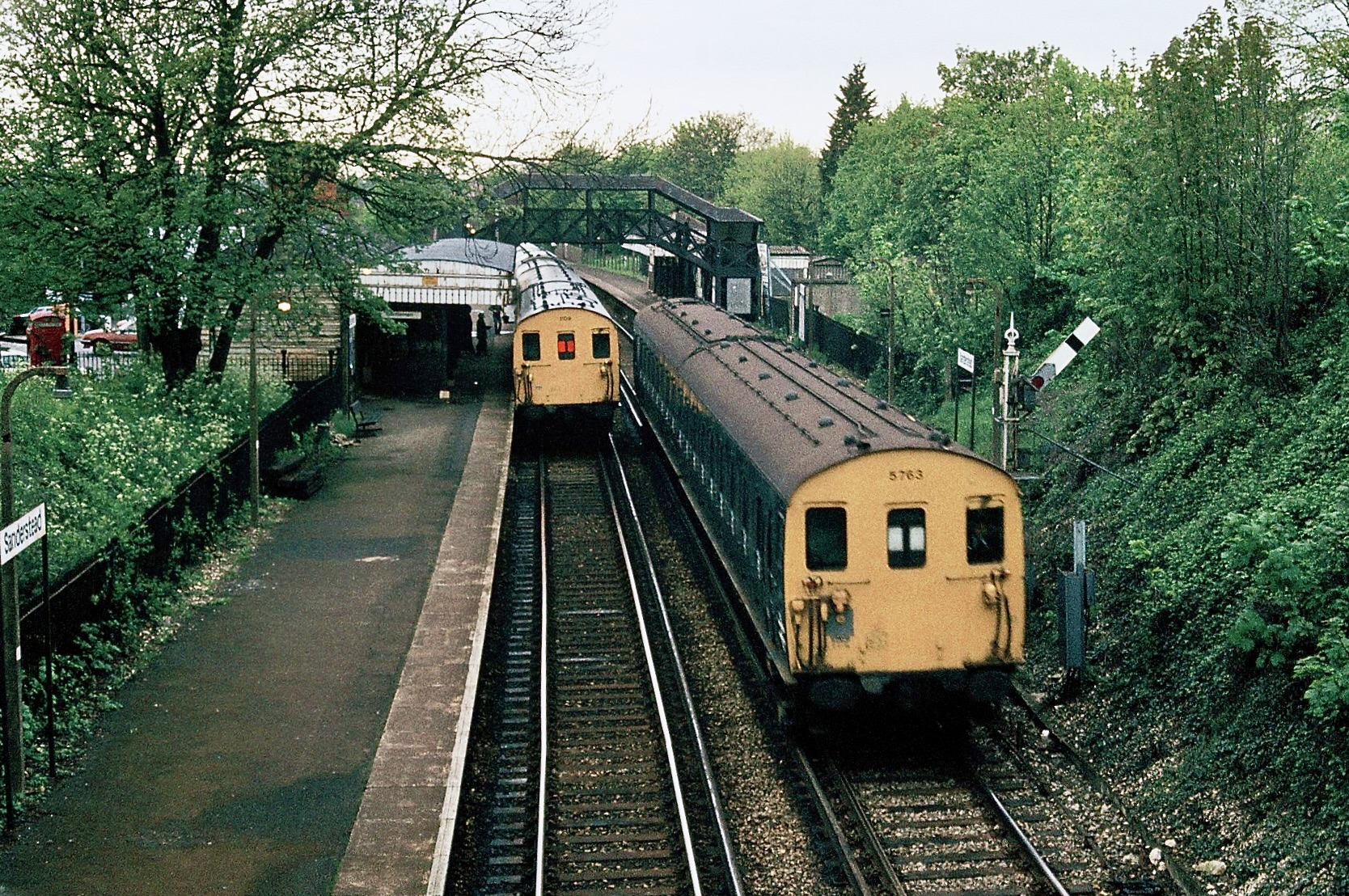
Class 416 "2-EPB" electric multiple units at Sanderstead station in May 1983

In the early 1980s, BR reached agreement with the railway trade unions to remove asbestos from the Class 205 and Class 207 diesel multiple units that worked passenger services on the Oxted line. The cost of refurbishing the trains was estimated at £4 million (equivalent to £12 million in 2025) and BR instead decided to electrify the South Croydon–East Grinstead section, at a cost of £7 million (£22 million in 2025), and to dispose of most of the contaminated units. In March 1983, third-rail electrification between South Croydon and Sanderstead was commissioned and electric trains began running on this short section of the Oxted line in May of that year.

The main phase of electrification, between Sanderstead and East Grinstead, was authorised in May 1985 and was completed in October 1987. The works included resignalling of the line south of Woldingham, transferring control to a new panel box at Oxted and constructing new station buildings at Sanderstead, Oxted and East Grinstead. Electric trains began running in public service on 5 October 1987, and the new timetable included an all-day, half-hourly service between London and East Grinstead for the first time. The new electric services proved popular with the public, and passenger numbers increased by around 12% in the first year of operation.

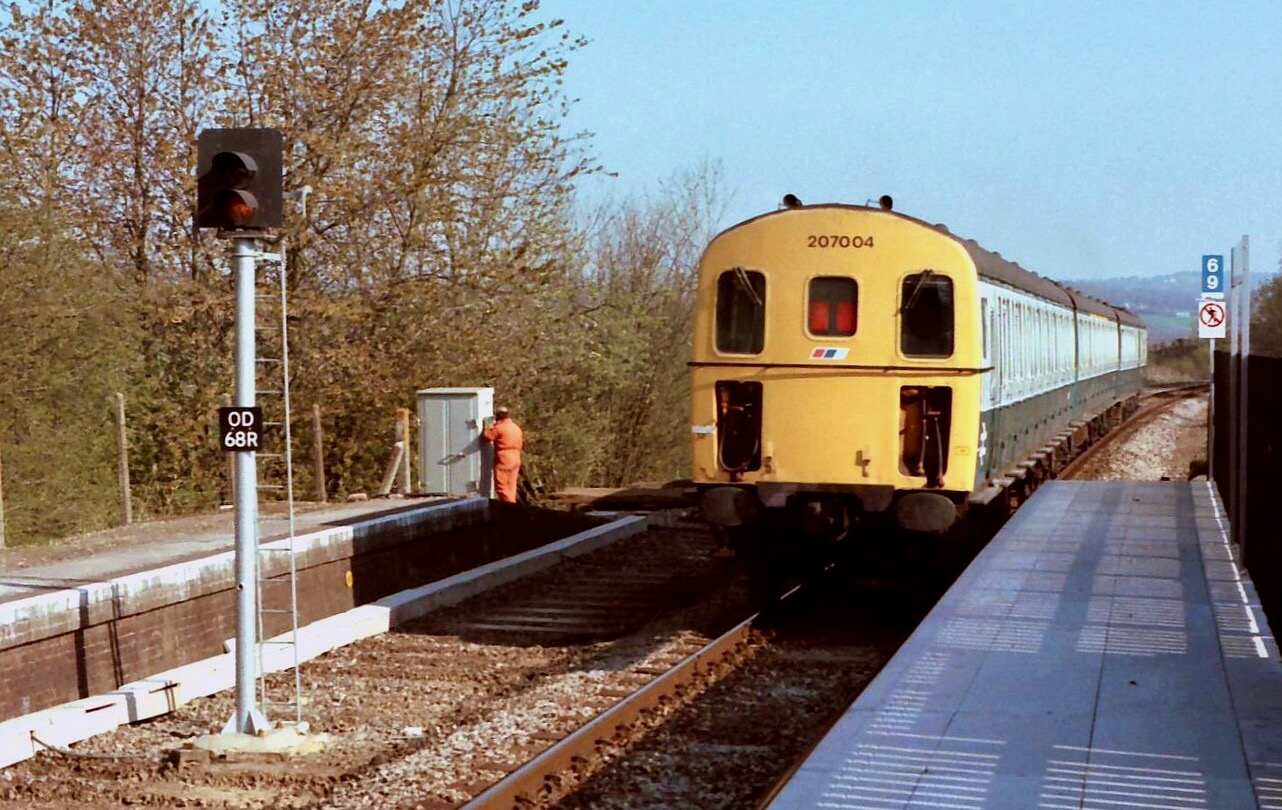
A Class 207 unit at Buxted station in April 1990: The new colour-light signal (left) has been installed on the track bed of the former northbound line.

In contrast, the Hurst Green Junction–Uckfield section was not electrified. After the East Grinstead electrification scheme had been completed, most trains from Uckfield terminated at Oxted and only four per day continued to London. Much of the branch south of Hever was converted to single track in 1990, although the associated resignalling reduced journey times by around five minutes. A Sunday service was reintroduced in May of that year, with an all-stations shuttle between Oxted and Crowborough every two hours. A full, hourly Sunday service, which included trains to Buxted and Uckfield, was introduced in May 1991. In the same month, the original Uckfield station was closed and its single-platform replacement, on the east side of the High Street, was opened. On 1 April 1994, the Oxted line came under the Network South Central shadow franchise in preparation for privatisation.

=== Privatisation (1996–2026) ===
Connex was awarded a seven-year franchise to operate passenger trains on the Oxted Line as Connex South Central, starting on 12 April 1996. Following concerns over the company's management and performance, the Shadow Strategic Rail Authority decided to re-tender the franchise in 2000. In October that year, the competition was won by Govia, which took over the running of trains in August 2001, having bought out the final two years of Connex's contract for £30 million (equivalent to £56M in 2025). Govia's ten-year franchise formally began in May 2003, when it introduced the "Southern" brand name. The agreement required the company to introduce an hourly service service between London Bridge and Uckfield by mid-2004, to retire the final slam-door trains and to invest £853 million (£1.56 billion in 2025) in new rolling stock. Class 171 units were introduced to Uckfield services in December 2003, allowing the Class 207 and Class 205 units to be withdrawn by the end of 2004.

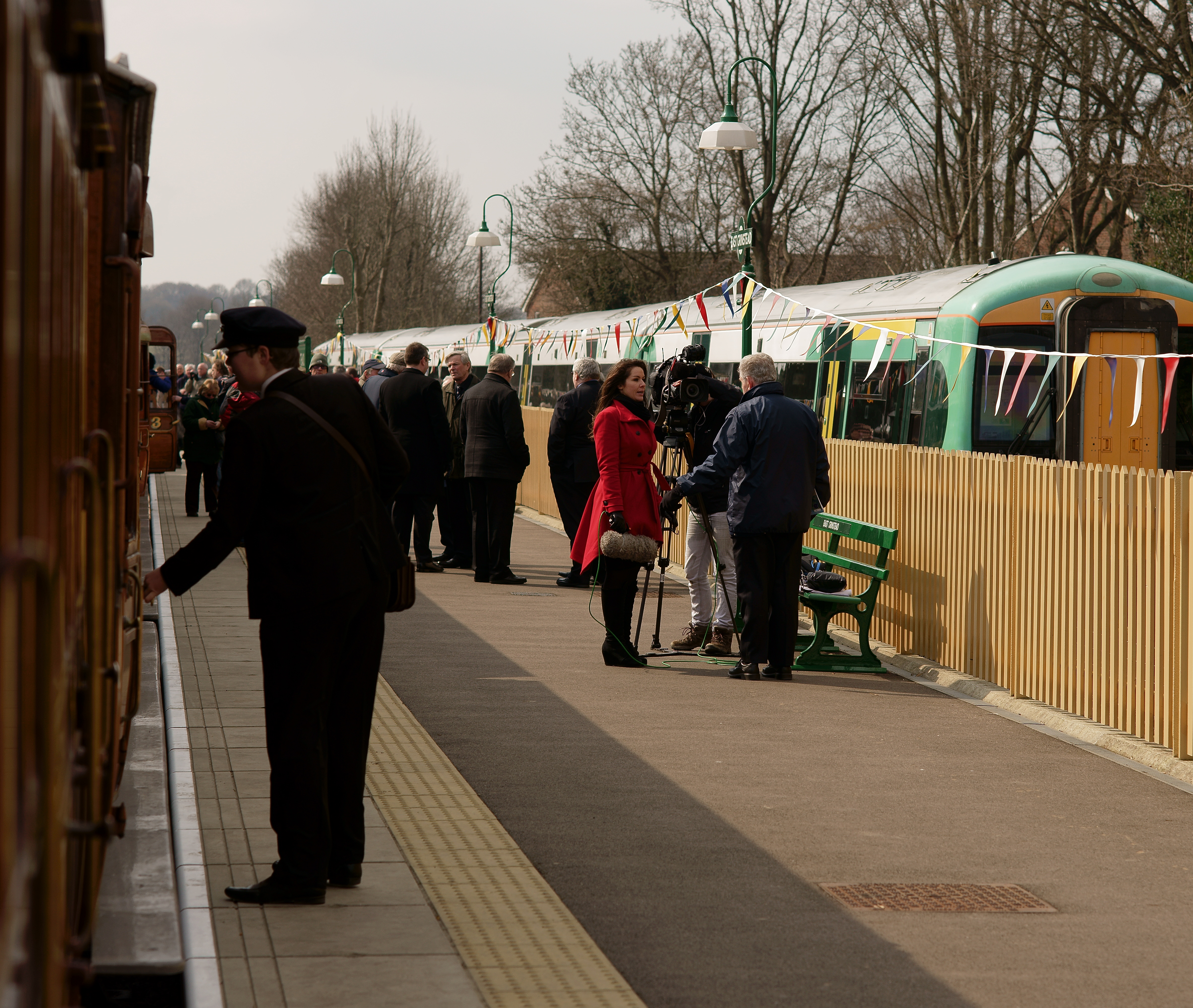
The Bluebell Railway station at East Grinstead on 27 March 2013, with a Class 377 stabled on the National Rail tracks behind

In the early 2010s, interchanges between the Oxted line and two heritage railways were created. In March 2011, the Spa Valley Railway was extended from Groombridge to the disused island platform at Eridge. A year later, in March 2012, the Bluebell Railway opened its extension to a new station at East Grinstead. A new station building for Oxted line trains at East Grinstead was first used by the public in December 2012 and was officially opened on 8 March the following year. Improvement works at other stations in the same decade included the lengthening of platforms between Edenbridge Town and Uckfield in preparation for the introduction of 10-coach trains.

Peak-hour Thameslink services, operated by 12-coach Class 700 units, began running to-and-from East Grinstead in May 2018. Station improvements in the 2020s have included the installation of new footbridges at Eridge in 2020, East Grinstead in 2022 and Crowborough in 2023. A two-year project to repair and refurbish Oxted Viaduct was completed in July 2022. The Govia Thameslink Railway contract ended on 31 May 2026, and passenger services operated by Southern and Thameslink were transferred to public ownership.

== Passenger rolling stock ==
The first steam locomotives known to have worked on the Oxted line, 2-2-2 tender engines built by Cravens, were in use in the late 1880s. A D2 class is known to have hauled freight trains in 1888 and G class locomotives, designed by William Stroudley, worked passenger services from the mid-1890s to 1909. In the first decade of the 20th century, I1 class tank engines, particularly suited to the steep gradients on the line, were introduced. Some members of the I1 class were rebuilt into the I1x class in the late 1920s and worked on the Oxted line until the start of the Second World War. Trains run by the South Eastern Railway via the Crowhurst Spur, were typically hauled by E1 class 2-4-0 and F class 4-4-0 locomotives, as well as Q class tank engines. After the formation of the Southern Railway in 1923, passenger services were hauled by B1, D, E and E1 class locomotives.

Autotrains were introduced to local stopping services in the late 1910s. These push-pull trains consisted of a tank engine coupled to a balloon trailer, a type of passenger carriage. The train would be driven from the locomotive in one direction and, in the other, from a driving position at the front of the carriage. Initially the autotrains were worked by D1 class locomotives, but these tank engines were replaced by D3, H and M7 class locomotives after the Second World War.

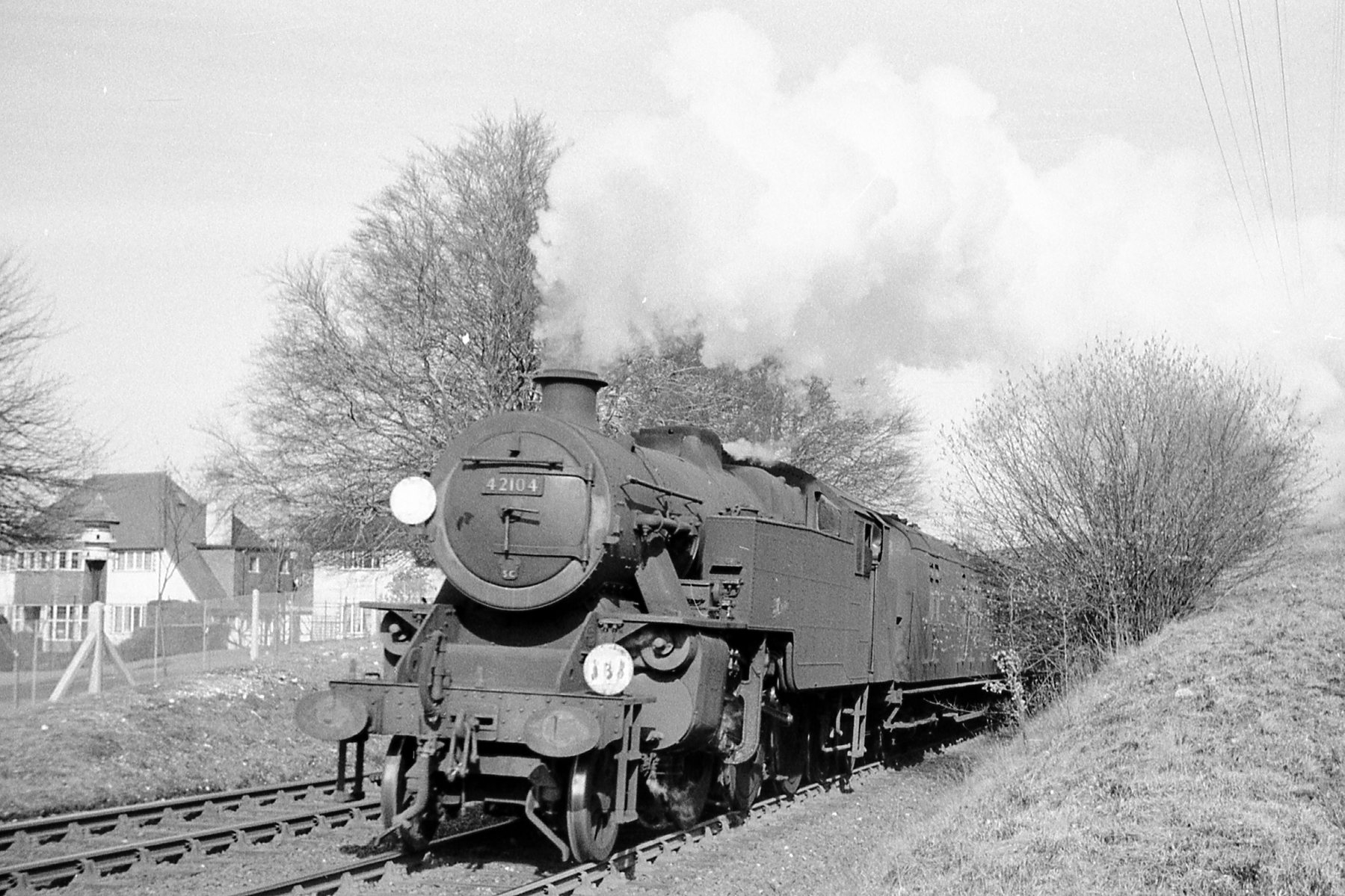
A Fairburn 2-6-4T tank engine near Sanderstead in 1960

From the mid-1940s onwards, express services were worked by K class, N class and Merchant Navy class tender engines. In the early 1950s, Fairburn 2-6-4T tank engines were introduced to the Oxted line, but were criticised by railway staff for being underpowered for the steep gradients. They were replaced in 1958 by Standard Class 3 and 4 tank engines.

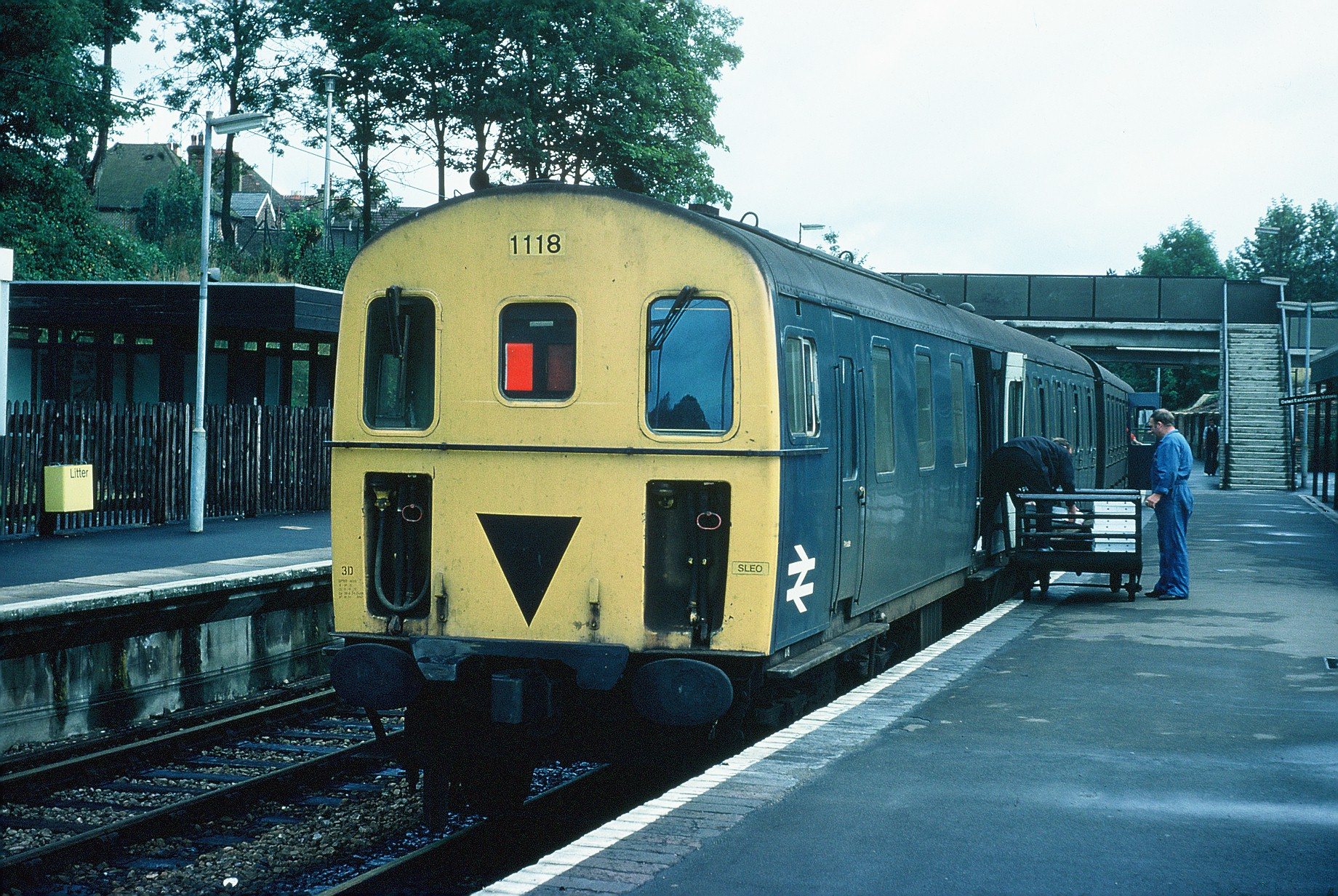
A Class 205 unit at East Grinstead in 1975

Class 207 diesel multiple units began working on the Oxted line on 18 June 1962, initially operating the busiest passenger services during peak hours. Steam-hauled passenger trains were withdrawn on 6 January 1964, but there were too few Class 207s to run the full timetable and so Class 33 locomotives were used to haul trains until 1983. In the 1970s, the Class 33s were supplemented by Class 47 and Class 73 locomotives, as well as Class 206 "Tadpole" units, normally allocated to the North Downs Line. The first Class 205 unit was trialled on the Oxted line in 1970 and two years later there were three in service on the route. Further units were transferred from other lines in the mid-1970s, and nine were reconfigured to provide more first-class seating for peak commuter services.

When they were built in the late 1950s and early 1960s, the Class 205 and Class 207 units were fitted with blue asbestos insulation panels. Following an agreement with the trade unions in the mid-1980s, the panels were removed from seven Class 207s and fifteen Class 205s. Units still contaminated with asbestos were scrapped and the remainder were used to operate services on the Uckfield branch, mostly as shuttles to-and-from Oxted. Class 171 units were introduced in passenger service in December 2003, (Note: The first Class 171 unit ran in passenger service on the Oxted line on 8 December 2003. At the time, the unit was provisionally classified as a Class 170/7.) allowing the Class 207 units to be withdrawn in August 2004. The Class 205s continued in passenger service until November of that year. (Note: 24 September 2004 was final scheduled day of service for the Class 205 units, but they were used until November 2004 whenever Class 171 units were unavailable. Additional Class 171s were cascaded to Southern from ScotRail in June 2015.)

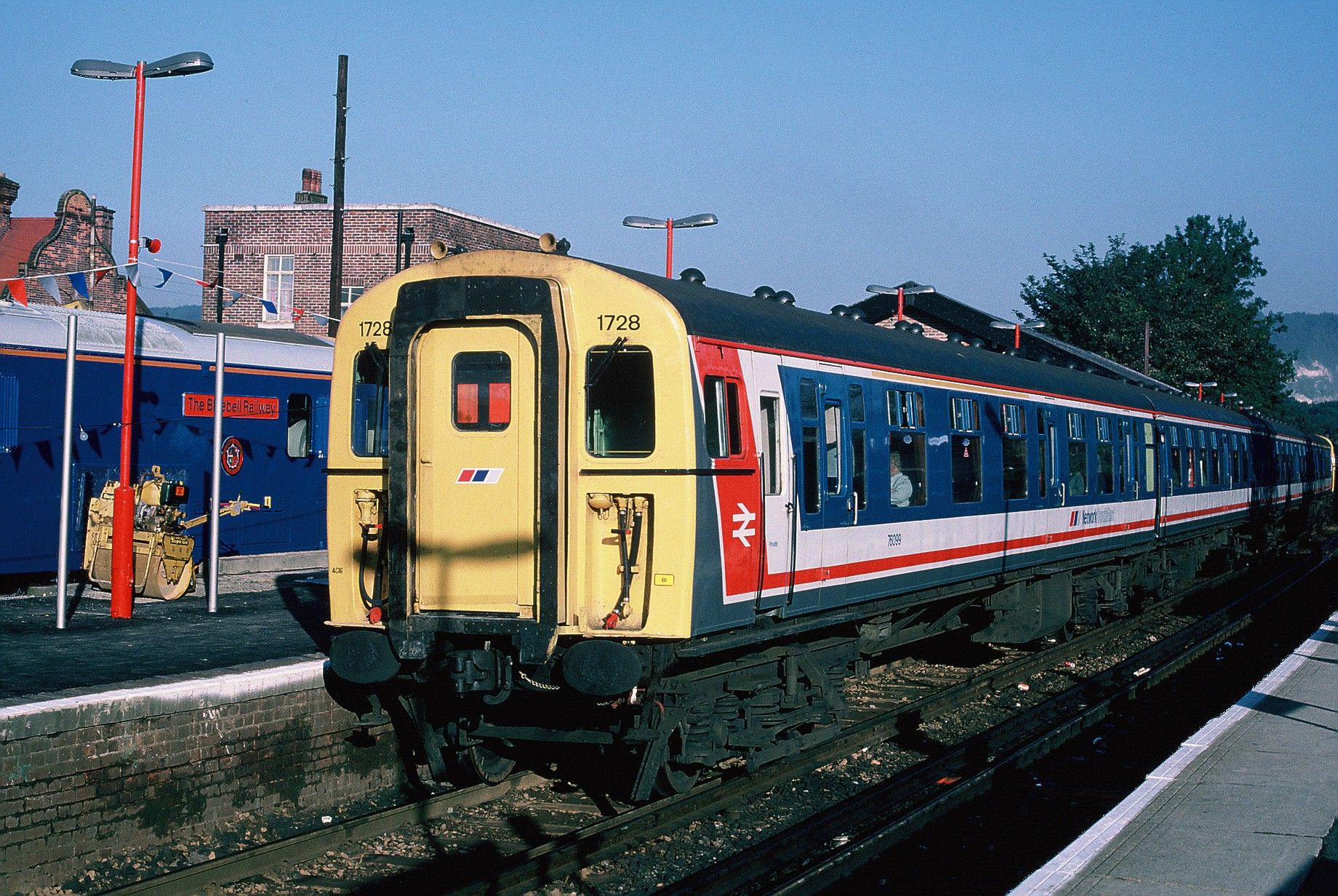
A Class 421 "4-CIG" unit at the Oxted "Electrification Gala" in September 1987

After the electrification of the South Croydon–East Grinstead section in 1987, services were run by Class 423 "4-VEP" and Class 421 "4-CIG" electric multiple units, supplemented with Class 416 "2-EPB" units on peak services. Passenger numbers increased as a result of the electrification and Class 415 "4-EPB" units, with standard class-only seating, were introduced in late 1988 to provide additional capacity at peak times. Following concerns over the gauge clearance in Oxted Tunnel, the Class 421s were withdrawn from the line in mid-1989 and window restrictors were fitted to the Class 423s.

Class 377s took over the vast majority of services on the electrified part of the Oxted line in December 2004, and the final service operated by a Class 423 unit ran on 27 September 2005. In May 2018, Class 700 units began operating Thameslink services to-and-from East Grinstead at peak times.

== Freight services ==
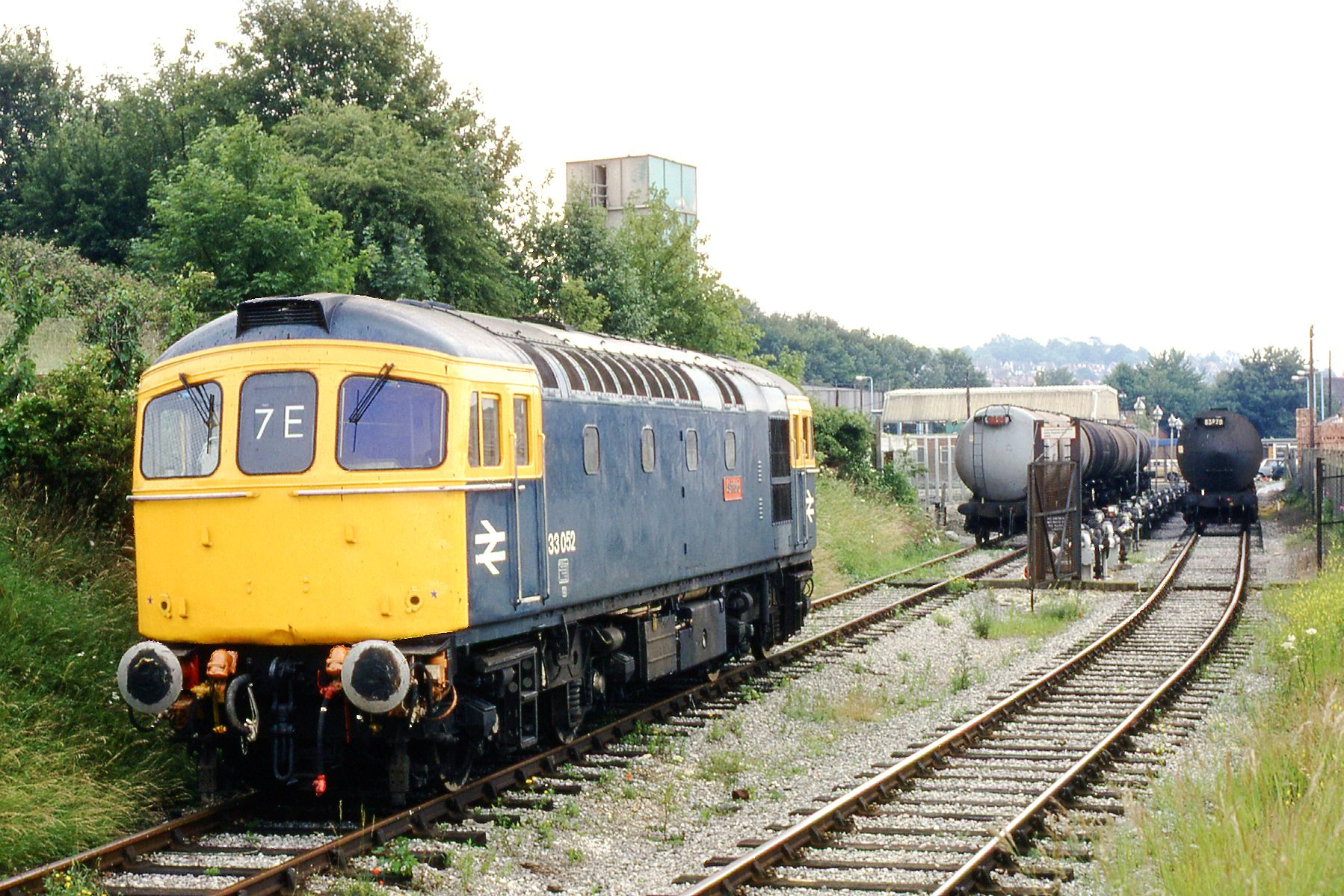
A Class 33 locomotive at Selsdon Oil Depot in 1980

Goods trains began running on the Oxted line when the South Croydon–East Grinstead section opened in 1884. Facilities for handling freight were provided at Upper Warlingham (then Warlingham), Oxted and Lingfield, and trains could access the lower and upper yards at East Grinstead from the outset. Additional sidings were provided in the 1890s at Woldingham, Lingfield and Oxted, where a goods shed was built in 1902–03. (Note: In 1933, the crane at Oxted goods yard had a lifting capacity of 6 long tons 0 cwt (13,400 lb or 6.1 t).) Tanker train deliveries to the Anglo-American Oil Company depot at Selsdon took place between 1894 and 1993.

The Oxted Greystone Lime Company was founded shortly before the opening of the South Croydon–East Grinstead section in 1884. From 1886, a standard-gauge, single-track branch ran from the Oxted line to three sidings at the base of the quarry, where lime could be transferred from the internal 2 ft (610 mm) system. Shipments via the railway ended around the start of the Second World War, but the standard-gauge branch was maintained until the rails were lifted in 1969. The majority of the narrow-gauge system was closed in 1953, but a length of around 50 m (160 ft) was retained until the 1970s to feed the lime kilns.

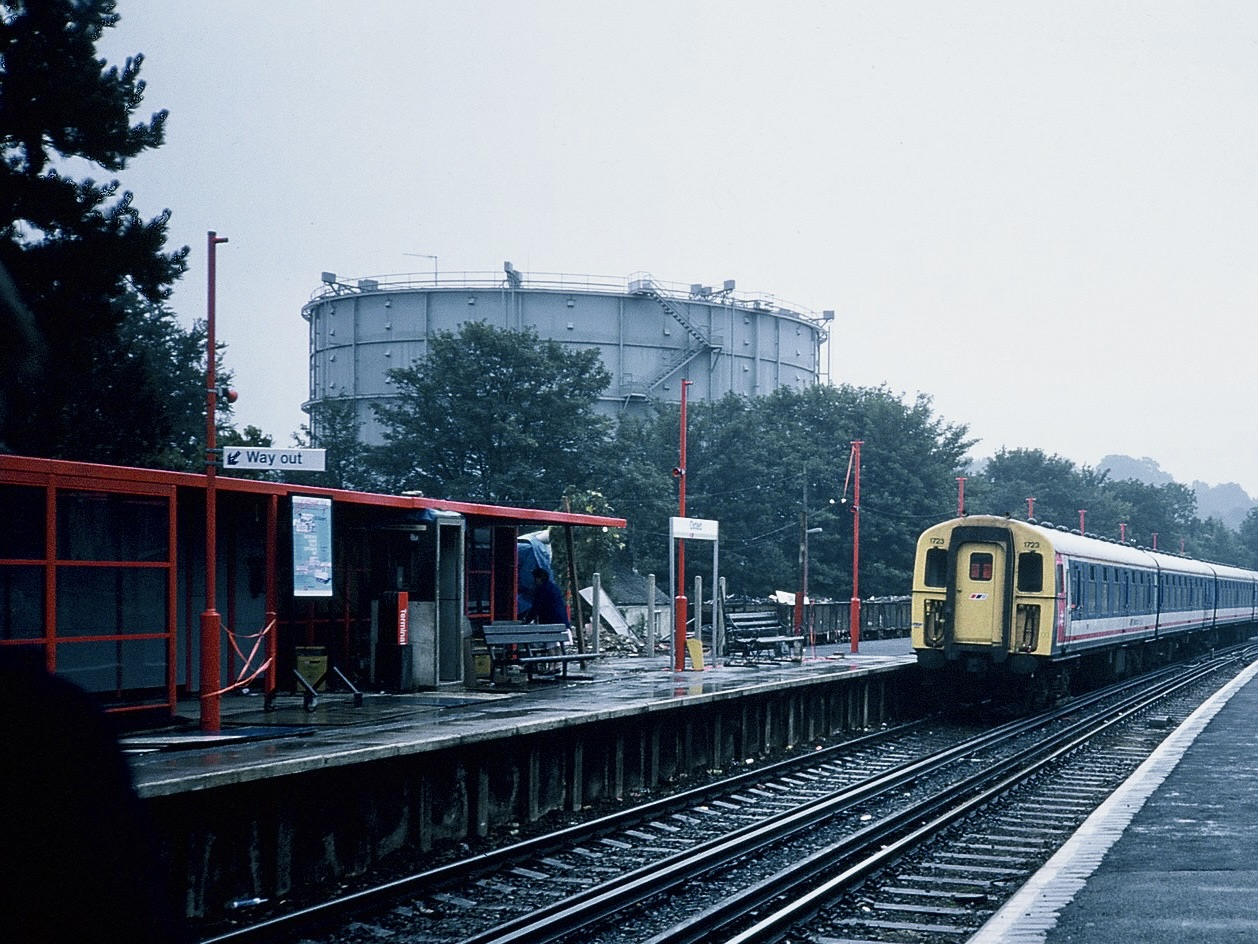
Oxted gas holder at Oxted station in 2004

The Oxted Gas Works, opened in 1885 and closed in June 1933, were served by sidings from the Oxted line. By 1920, the works were consuming around 1,750 t (1,930 tons) of coal every year, all delivered by rail. The sidings were lifted in May 1986, as part of the Sanderstead–East Grinstead electrification works.

Crowhurst brickworks (also known as Lingfield brickworks) opened with the Oxted line in 1884. Coal was delivered to a purpose-built siding until the 1950s, when the brick kilns were converted to use gas. In the 1960s, some of the claypits were used for landfill, and domestic waste was delivered to the site by rail. The brickworks closed in 1980. A banana-ripening shed opened at Lingfield in 1958 and fruit was delivered by rail in refrigerated vans until 1971. The sidings serving the ripening facility were removed in the mid-1970s.

The withdrawal of station freight facilities began in the mid-1950s, with the yard at Hever closing in 1955. The goods yard at Woldingham shut on 4 May 1959 and those at the south end of Mark Beech Tunnel, at Cowden and at Ashurst closed the following year. Also in 1960, rail deliveries to a factory between Selsdon and Sanderstead ceased, although the points to the sidings were not removed until 1969. Freight facilities were withdrawn at East Grinstead in 1967 and at Crowborough in 1968.

== Proposals ==
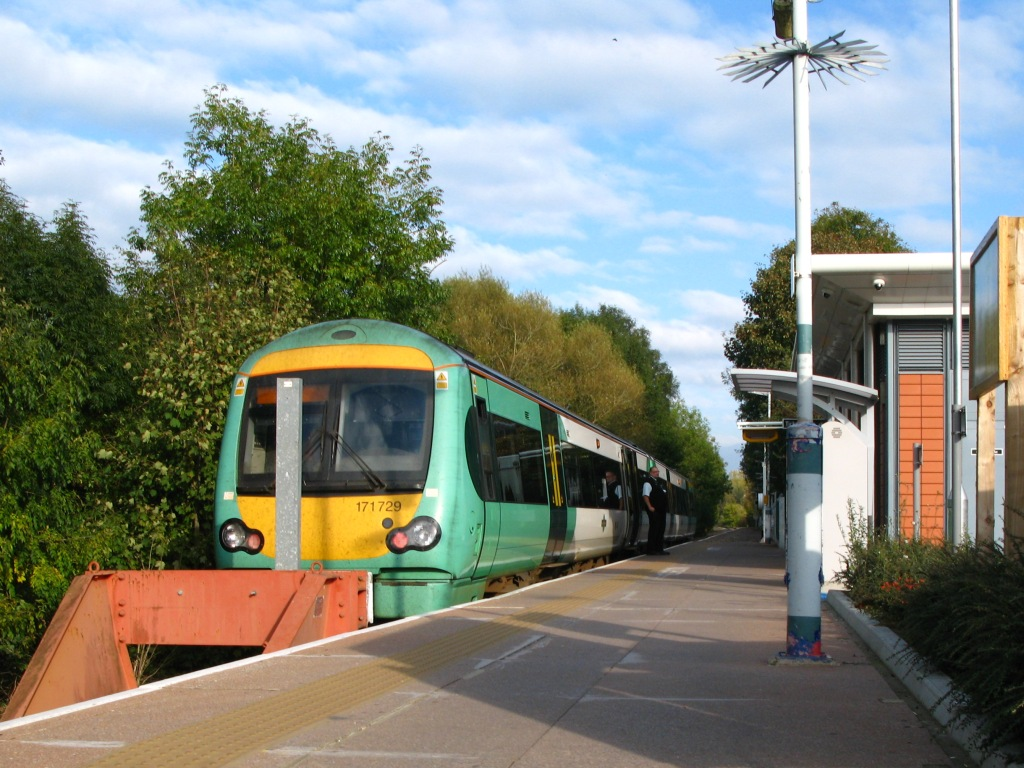
A Class 171 diesel multiple unit at the buffer stop at the current Uckfield station, opened on 13 May 1991

Electrification of the Hurst Green Junction–Uckfield section of the Oxted line, currently operated by Class 171 diesel multiple units, was identified as a priority by Network Rail in 2022. The "East Sussex Rail Strategy and Action Plan", published in November 2013, favoured electrification as well as redoubling the single-line sections. It suggested that these infrastructure improvements would reduce journey times and allow a more efficient use of rolling stock, which could lead to an increase in service frequencies. The Surrey Rail Strategy, published in March 2021 under the title "A new rail strategy for Surrey", was also supportive of electrification, noting that it would increase capacity and reduce carbon emissions.

An independent report, authored by Chris Gibb and published in March 2017, estimated that electrification of the line between Hurst Green Junction and Uckfield would cost £75–95 million (equivalent to £100–£130 million in 2025), and indicated that the existing infrastructure could support a half-hourly service without the need for redoubling. A July 2023 conference reported that the Office of Rail and Road was considering a form of third-rail electrification for the line, in which the conductor rail is switched off in stations unless a train is present. In March 2024, Govia Thameslink Railway suggested that battery-powered trains could be suitable for the route.

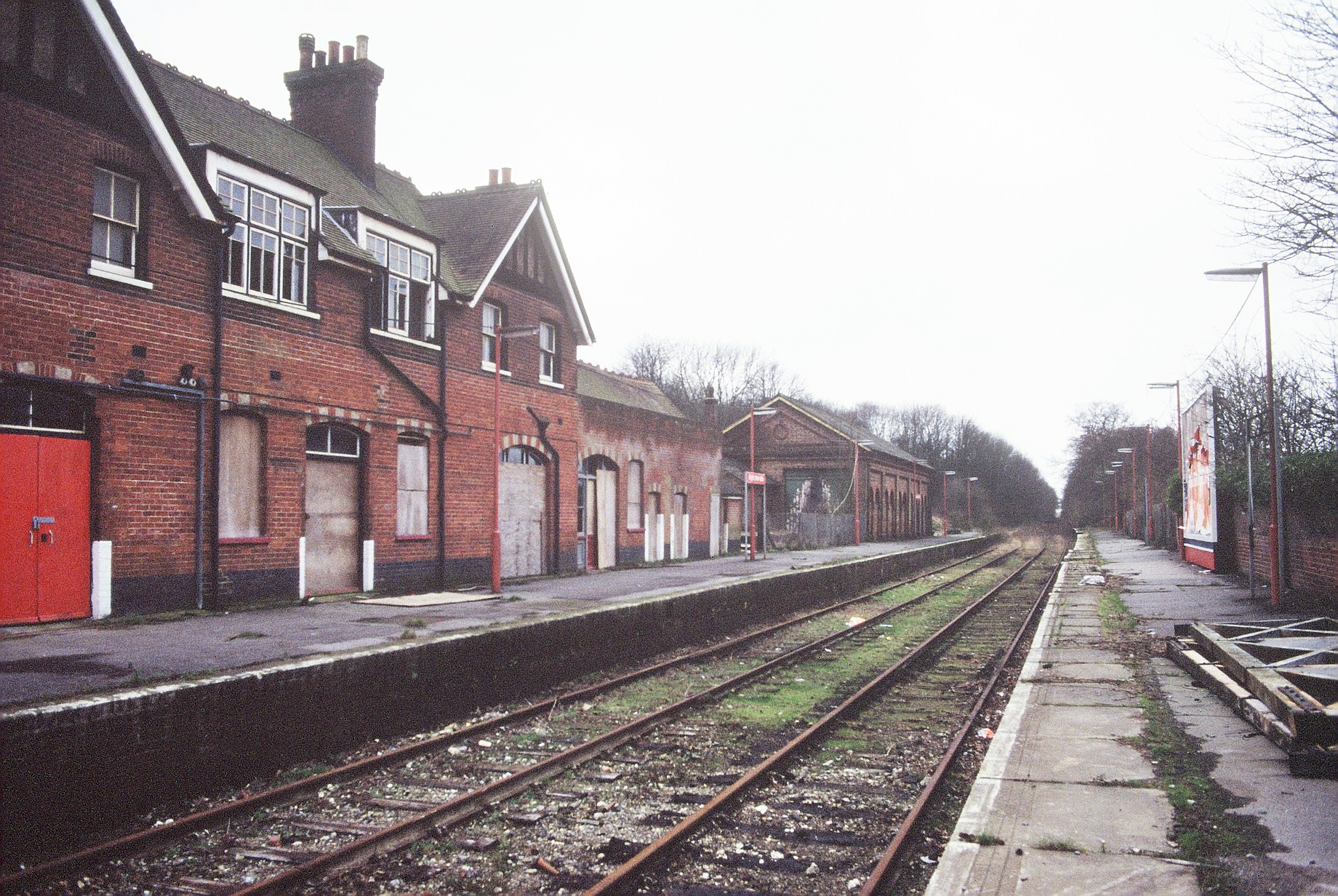
The former Uckfield station in June 1994, looking along the disused track bed towards Lewes

There have been several proposals to reopen the Uckfield–Lewes line, including as part of a longer-distance high-speed route dubbed "Brighton Main Line 2", intended to relieve the direct rail route between London and Sussex via Gatwick Airport. Although the track bed has been protected from development since May 1980, the rail infrastructure operators and the British government have repeatedly refused to authorise the schemes. The report published by Chris Gibb in March 2017 indicated that there would be no business case for rebuilding the Uckfield–Lewes line unless there was strong housing growth in the area. Furthermore, Gibb suggested that works to increase the capacity of the Brighton Main Line should be prioritised ahead of the construction of a new high-speed link.

== Accidents and incidents ==
- 1 August 1882: Two trains, one transporting navvies and the other carrying ballast, collided in Riddlesdown Tunnel while the line was still being constructed. Ten workers were seriously injured.
- 3 January 1909: A locomotive collided with a broken-down passenger train, which it had been sent to assist, between Crowborough and Buxted. Eight people were injured.
- 5 April 1916: A passenger train derailed between Crowborough and Buxted. Seven people were injured, including the driver and fireman.
- 7 December 1948: A driver was injured in Mark Beech Tunnel when part of his locomotive's boiler failed.
- 21 April 1988: A track maintenance worker was killed and a second was injured when they were hit by a train in a tunnel near Crowborough.
- 15 October 1994, Cowden rail crash: Two trains collided on the single-line section south of Cowden station after one passed a red signal. Five people were killed, including the drivers of both trains and a guard.
- 13 February 2020: A landslip near Lingfield closed the Oxted line between Hurst Green and East Grinstead for six weeks. Passenger services resumed on 30 March 2020.

== Bibliography ==
- Body, Geoffrey (1989) [1984]. Railways of the Southern Region. Wellingborough: Patrick Stephens Ltd. ISBN 978-1-85-260297-0.
- Bridge, Mike, ed. (2017). TRACKatlas of Mainland Britain (3rd ed.). Sheffield: Platform 5. ISBN 978-1-90-943126-3.
- Brown, David; Jackson, Alan A. (1990). Network SouthEast Handbook. Harrow Weald: Capital Transport Publishing. ISBN 978-1-85-414129-3.
- Course, Edwin (1974). The Railways of Southern England: Secondary and Branch Lines. London: B.T. Batford. ISBN 978-0-71-342835-3.
- Gould, David (2003). The Croydon, Oxted & East Grinstead Railway. Usk: Oakwood Press. ISBN 978-0-85-361598-9.
- Gray, Adrian (1990). South Eastern Railway. Midhurst: Middleton Press. ISBN 978-0-90-652085-7.
- Green, Chris; Vincent, Mike (2014). The Network SouthEast story. Hersham: Ian Allan Ltd. ISBN 978-0-86-093653-4.
- Jackson, Alan A. (1999). The Railway in Surrey. Penryn: Atlantic Transport Publishers. ISBN 978-0-90-689990-8.
- Kidner, R.W. (1975) [1972]. The Oxted Line. Tarrant Hinton: Oakwood Press. ISBN 978-0-85-361103-5.
- Mitchell, Vic; Smith, Keith (1984). Branch Lines to East Grinstead. Midhurst: Middleton Press. ISBN 978-0-90-652007-9.
- Mitchell, Vic; Smith, Keith (1986). Branch Lines to Tunbridge Wells. Midhurst: Middleton Press. ISBN 978-0-90-652032-1.
- Mitchell, Vic; Smith, Keith (1990). Redhill to Ashford. Country Rail Routes. Midhurst: Middleton Press. ISBN 978-0-90-652073-4.
- Mitchell, Vic; Smith, Keith (1995). Croydon (Woodside) to East Grinstead. Midhurst: Middleton Press. ISBN 978-1-87-379348-0.
- Oppitz, Leslie (1987). Sussex Railways Remembered. Newbury: Countryside Books. ISBN 978-0-90-539299-8.
- Oppitz, Leslie (1988). Surrey Railways Remembered. Newbury: Countryside Books. ISBN 978-1-85-306005-2.
- Quick, Michael (2023) [2001]. Railway Passenger Stations in Great Britain (PDF) (5.05 ed.). London: Railway and Canal Historical Society.
- Smith, Paul; Salmon, Sally (2019). Directory of British Railways: New and Reopened Stations. Barnsley: Pen and Sword. ISBN 978-1-52-670430-6.
- Turner, J.T. Howard (1978). The London, Brighton & South Coast Railway. Vol. 2 : Establishment and Growth. London: B.T. Batsford. ISBN 978-0-71-341198-0.
- Welch, Michael (2005). Southern DEMUs. Harrow: Capital Transport. ISBN 978-1-85-414287-0.
- Thomas, David St John; Whitehouse, Patrick (1988). A Century and a Half of SR150: The Southern Railway. Newton Abbot: David & Charles. ISBN 978-0-71-539148-8.
- "Kent / Sussex / Wessex Routes Sectional Appendix" (PDF). Network Rail. 2009.
- "Delivering a better railway for a better Britain | Route Specifications: South East" (PDF). Network Rail. 2016.
