= Lingfield railway station =

Railway station in Surrey, England

Lingfield
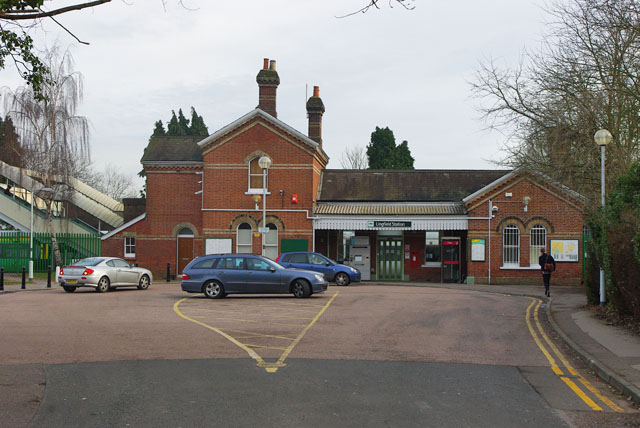

General information
- Location: Lingfield, District of Tandridge; England
- Coordinates: 51.176°N 0.007°W
- Grid reference: TQ394438
- Managed by: Southern
- Platforms: 2

Other information
- Station code: LFD
- Classification: DfT category E

History
- Opened: 10 March 1884

Passengers
- 2020/21: ▼0.128 million
- 2021/22: ▲0.318 million
- 2022/23: ▲0.353 million
- 2023/24: ▲0.385 million
- 2024/25: ▲0.415 million
Location
Notes
- Passenger statistics from the Office of Rail and Road

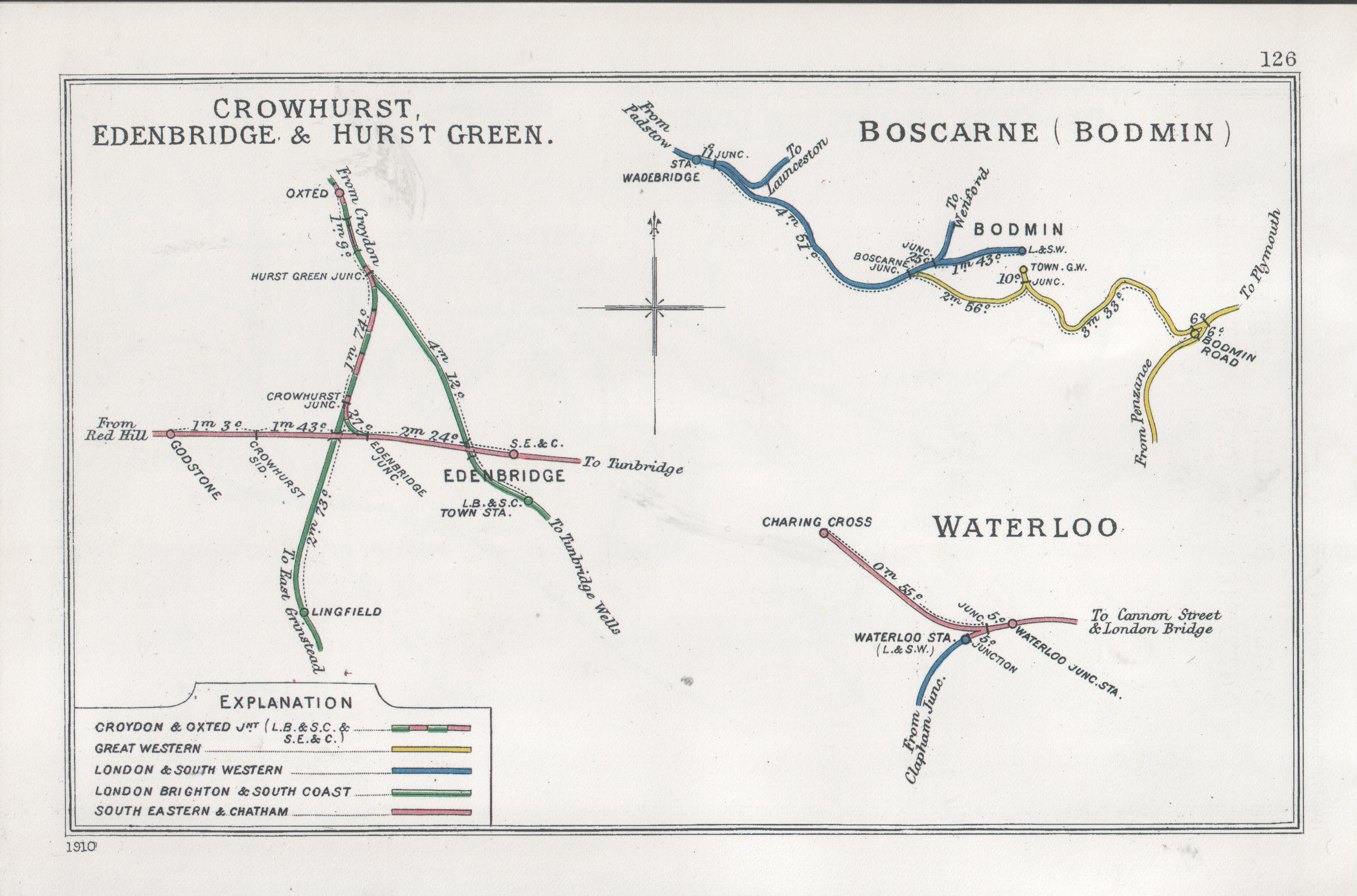
A 1910 Railway Clearing House map of lines around Lingfield railway station.

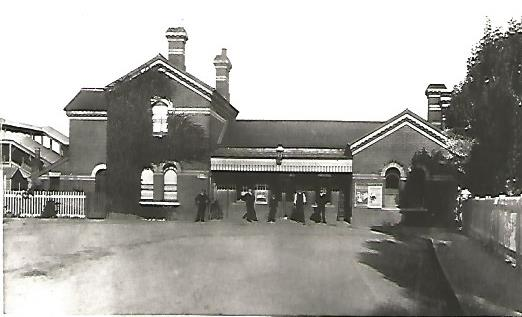
Lingfield railway station in LBSCR days circa 1910 (Frith postcard)

Lingfield railway station is on the East Grinstead branch of the Oxted line in southern England and serves Lingfield in Surrey. It is 26 miles 23 chains (26.29 miles, 42.31 km) from London Bridge, although off peak trains run to and from London Victoria. The station is managed by Southern.

The station adjoins Lingfield Park Racecourse.

== History ==
The opening of the London, Brighton and South Coast Railway's (LBSCR) Oxted Line in 1884 brought the railway to the small agricultural parish of Lingfield which, like its neighbour Dormansland, had been earmarked for residential development. The area was also to be the location of a new racecourse which was to open in 1890. Lingfield originally had only limited facilities to accommodate passengers and freight, and struggled to deal with the crowds which attended the race meetings. A goods shed and loading dock were added in May 1884, and in 1894 the down platform became an island and the loading dock was extended to become a departure platform for race specials. The LBSCR obtained authorisation to construct a line directly to the racecourse in 1898, but these plans never materialised.

Goods traffic was at a peak during the interwar period, when the sidings saw a variety of interesting traffic. Horseboxes and cattle wagons were numerous, and during the war, it was a stabling point for an emergency tank train. A large banana ripening shed was opened in the late 1950s and this received supplies direct from Avonmouth Docks. This closed on 1 October 1971 as bananas were now containerised and transported by road. Race traffic has also decreased and the track layout was progressively simplified, leaving the remaining traffic to be dealt with by strengthening ordinary services. Further modifications were carried out in 1972 when the station was "modernised" by demolishing the goods shed and removing the down platform canopy. However, the main buildings, together with the adjoining stationmaster's house, have survived as good examples of an LBSCR country station.

== Services ==
Off-peak, all services at Lingfield are operated by Southern using Class 377 EMUs.

The typical off-peak service in trains per hour is:

- 1 tph to London Victoria via Oxted
- 1 tph to East Grinstead

During the peak hours and on weekends, the service is increased to 2 tph in each direction.

During the peak hours, there are also Thameslink operated services between East Grinstead, London Bridge and Bedford. These services are operated using Class 700 EMUs.

Preceding station	National Rail	Following station
Hurst Green	Southern Oxted Line East Grinstead Branch	Dormans
Hurst Green	Thameslink Bedford to East Grinstead Peak Hours Only	Dormans
