= Dormans railway station =

Railway station in Surrey, England

Coordinates: 51°09′22″N 0°00′14″W

Dormans
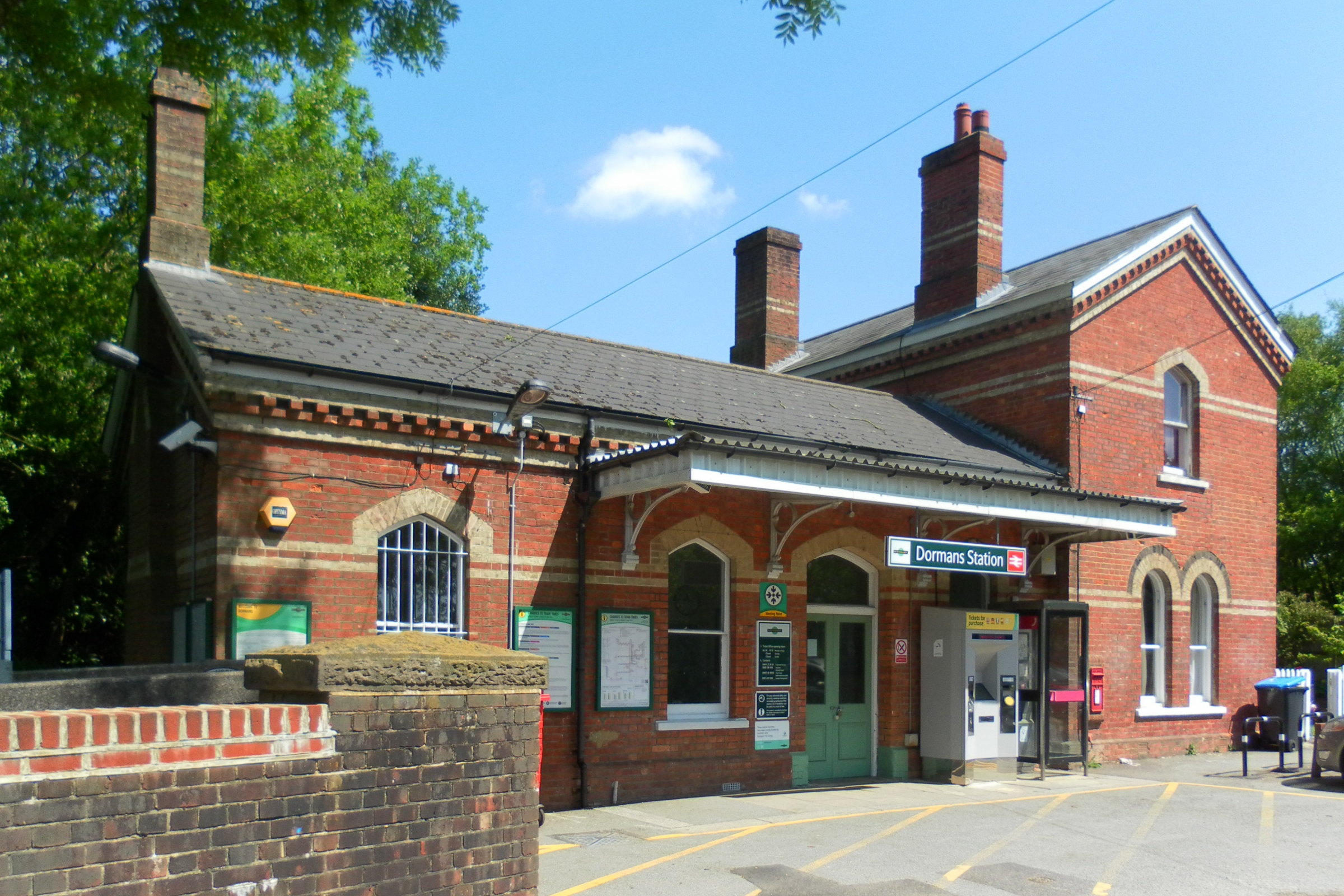

General information
- Location: Dormansland and Dormans Park, District of Tandridge; England
- Grid reference: TQ396415
- Managed by: Southern
- Platforms: 2

Other information
- Station code: DMS
- Classification: DfT category E

History
- Opened: 10 March 1884

Passengers
- 2020/21: ▼43,080
- 2021/22: ▲92,348
- 2022/23: ▲0.103 million
- 2023/24: ▲0.114 million
- 2024/25: ▲0.123 million
Location
Notes
- Passenger statistics from the Office of Rail and Road

Dormans railway station is on the East Grinstead branch of the Oxted line in southern England. It serves Dormansland and Dormans Park in Surrey. Most trains run between London Victoria and East Grinstead and are operated by Southern. Thameslink trains call at peak times on weekdays.

The station, now managed by Southern, was built by the London, Brighton and South Coast Railway and opened with the line in 1884.

== History ==
Dormans is one of the original stations on the South Croydon–East Grinstead section of the Oxted line, opened on 10 March 1884. Built by the London, Brighton and South Coast Railway (LB&SCR), the station building is on the east side of the railway, which is in a shallow cutting at this point. The L-shaped brick building has two parts – a single-storey waiting room and ticket office, and a two-storey wing that was formerly the stationmaster's residence.

No public freight yard was provided at Dormans, although private sidings were constructed for the Homes of St Barnabas (now the College of St Barnabas) and the Dormans Park estate.

== Facilities and Connections ==
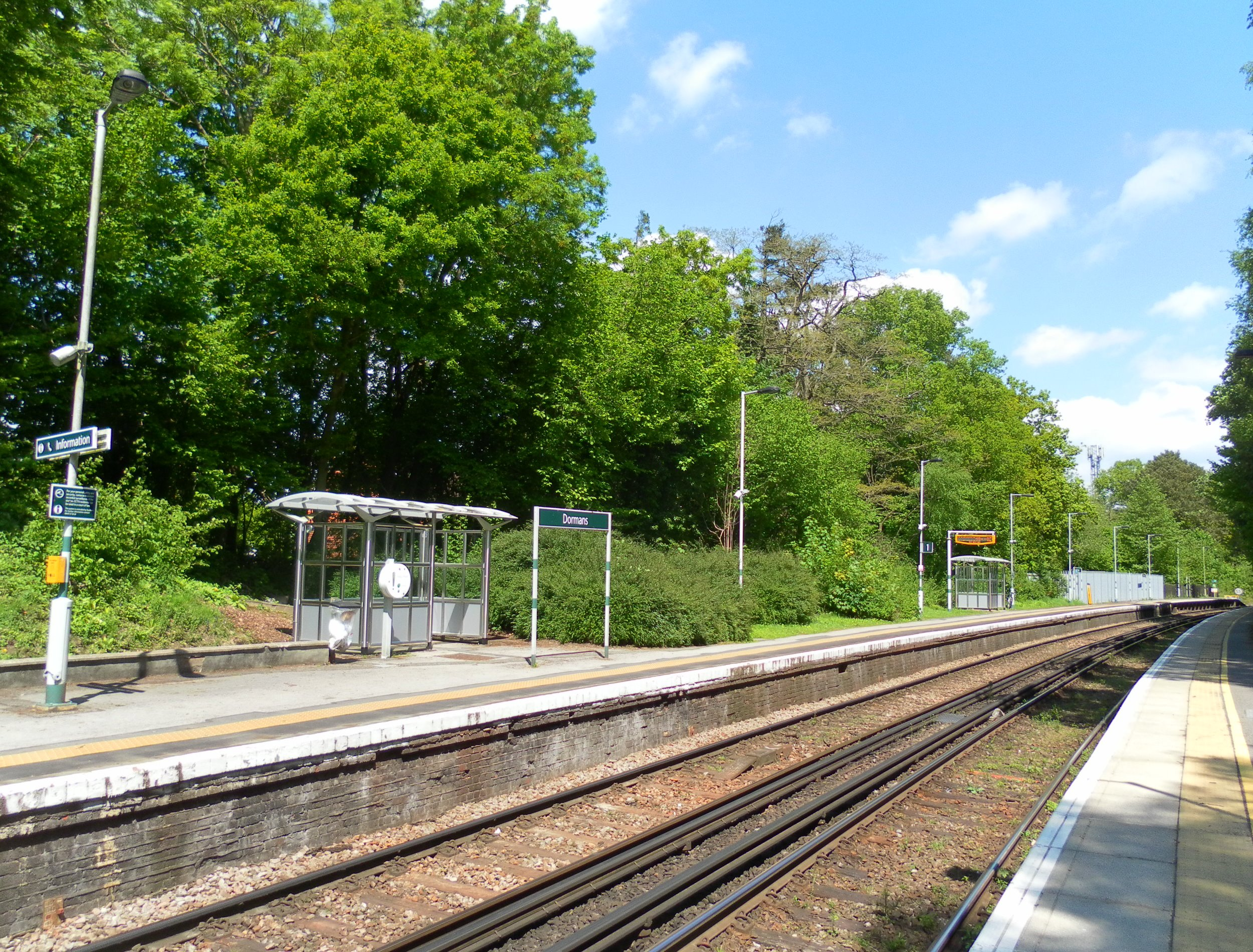
Station platforms in 2013

Dormans station is 27 mi 62 ch (44.7 km) down the line from London Victoria via East Croydon. It has two platforms: platform 1 (for northbound trains towards London via Oxted) is 169.0 m (554 ft) long and platform 2 (for trains to East Grinstead) is 167.5 m (550 ft) long. The northbound platform is wheelchair accessible, but the southbound platform can only be reached via a stepped footbridge. Passenger help points and seated areas can be found on both platforms.

The station has a ticket office (with a waiting area), which is staffed during Monday-Friday mornings only (06:30-10:15). There is a self-service ticket machine, although there are no ticket barriers. There is also a small cycle storage area at the entrance to the station.

== Services ==
Off-peak, all services at Dormans are operated by Southern using Class 377 EMUs.

The typical off-peak service in trains per hour is:

- 2 tph to London Victoria via Oxted
- 2 tph to East Grinstead

During the middle of the day on Mondays and Tuesdays, this service is reduced to one train per hour.

During the peak hours, there are also Thameslink operated services between East Grinstead, London Bridge and Bedford. These services are operated using Class 700 EMUs.

Preceding station	National Rail	Following station
Lingfield	Southern Oxted Line East Grinstead Branch	East Grinstead
Lingfield	Thameslink Bedford to East Grinstead Peak Hours Only	East Grinstead

== Bibliography ==
- Body, Geoffrey (1989) [1984]. Railways of the Southern Region. Wellingborough: Patrick Stephens Ltd. ISBN 978-1-85-260297-0.
- Gould, David (2003). The Croydon, Oxted & East Grinstead Railway. Usk: Oakwood Press. ISBN 978-0-85-361598-9.
- Jackson, Alan A. (1999). The railway in Surrey. Penryn: Atlantic Transport Publishers. ISBN 978-0-90-689990-8.
- Quick, Michael (2023) [2001]. Railway Passenger Stations in Great Britain (PDF) (5.05 ed.). London: Railway and Canal Historical Society.
- "Kent / Sussex / Wessex Routes Sectional Appendix" (PDF). Network Rail. 2009.
