= Monks Lane Halt railway station =

Former railway station in England

Monks Lane Halt

General information
- Location: Oxted, Tandridge District; England
- Coordinates: 51.220420°N 0.034590°E
- Platforms: 2

Other information
- Status: Disused

History
- Pre-grouping: London, Brighton and South Coast Railway
- Post-grouping: Southern Railway

Key dates
- 1 June 1907: opened
- 11 September 1939: closed to passengers
Location

Monks Lane Halt was a railway halt about 2.5 kilometres (1.6 mi) south of Hurst Green. It was on the Uckfield Branch of the Oxted line beside Monks Lane bridge.

Preceding station	Disused railways	Following station
Hurst Green Halt; Line open, station closed	London, Brighton and South Coast Railway	Edenbridge Town; Line open, station open

== History ==
The station was opened on 1 June 1907 by the London, Brighton and South Coast Railway (LBSCR) to serve expected development nearby, at the same time as the nearby Hurst Green halt. The halt consisted of two wooden platforms with a corrugated iron shelter on each.

The station closed to passengers on 11 September 1939. The line remains open and is today used by trains on the Uckfield branch of the Oxted line, although nothing remains of the station.
