= Purley Downs Golf Club Halt railway station =

Disused railway station in Purley, London

Coordinates: 54.1114°N 0.0988°W

Purley Downs Golf Club Halt

General information
- Location: Purley, London Borough of Croydon; England
- Platforms: 2

Other information
- Status: Disused

History
- Original company: South Eastern Railway
- Pre-grouping: South Eastern Railway
- Post-grouping: Southern Railway

Key dates
- 1914: Opened
- 1927: Closed

Purley Downs Golf Club Halt railway station served the Purley Downs golf club area of Purley, London Borough of Croydon, England, from 1914 to 1927 on the Oxted line.

== History ==
The station was opened in 1914 by the South Eastern Railway. It closed in 1927. A few months later, Riddlesdown opened south of the station.

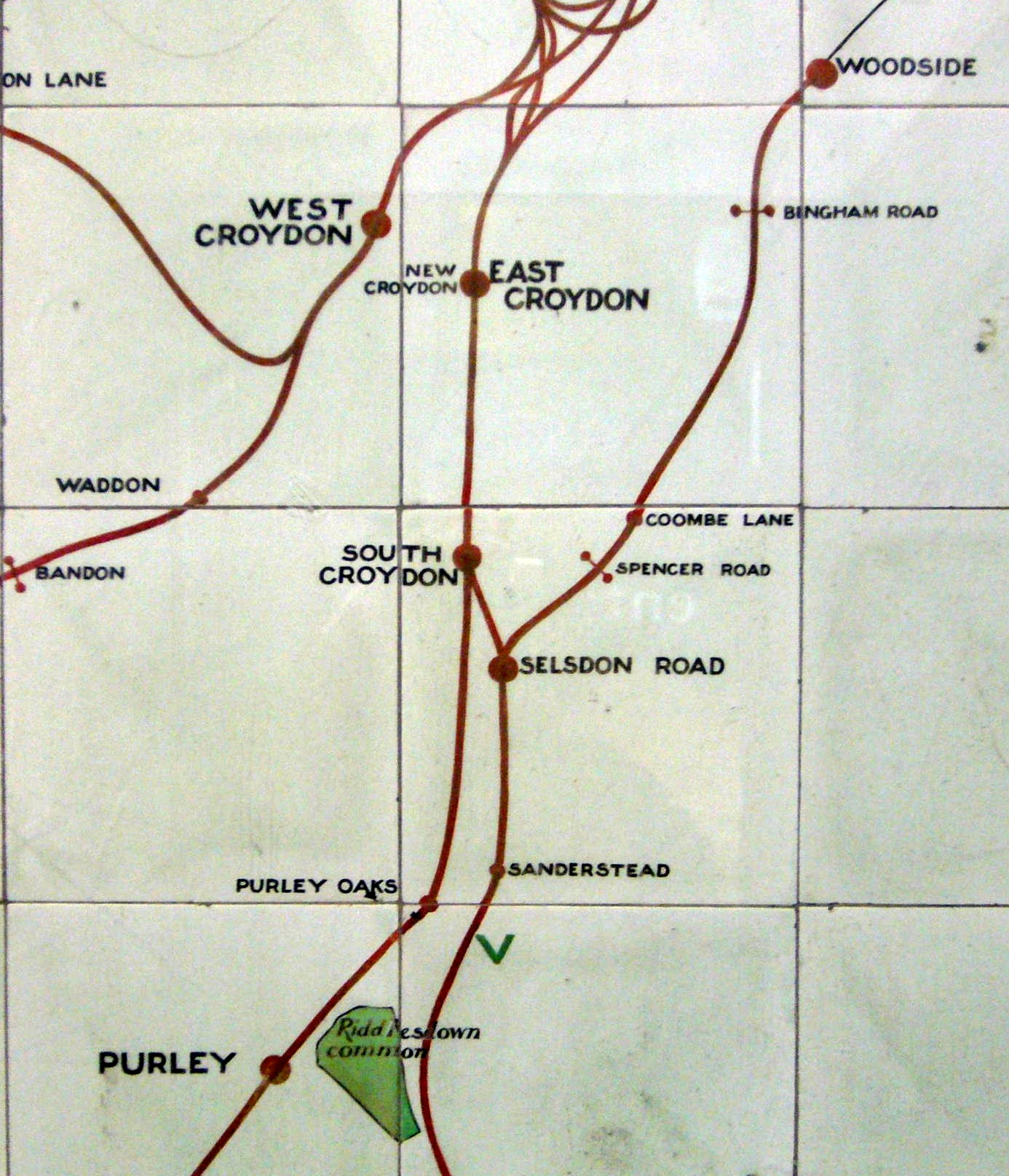
This map at Victoria Station describes it as a "golf link". (key to symbols)

Preceding station	Historical railways	Following station
Sanderstead; Line and station open	South Eastern Railway; Oxted line	Upper Warlingham; Line and station open
