= Surrey and Sussex Junction Railway =

Abandoned 19th-century railway scheme

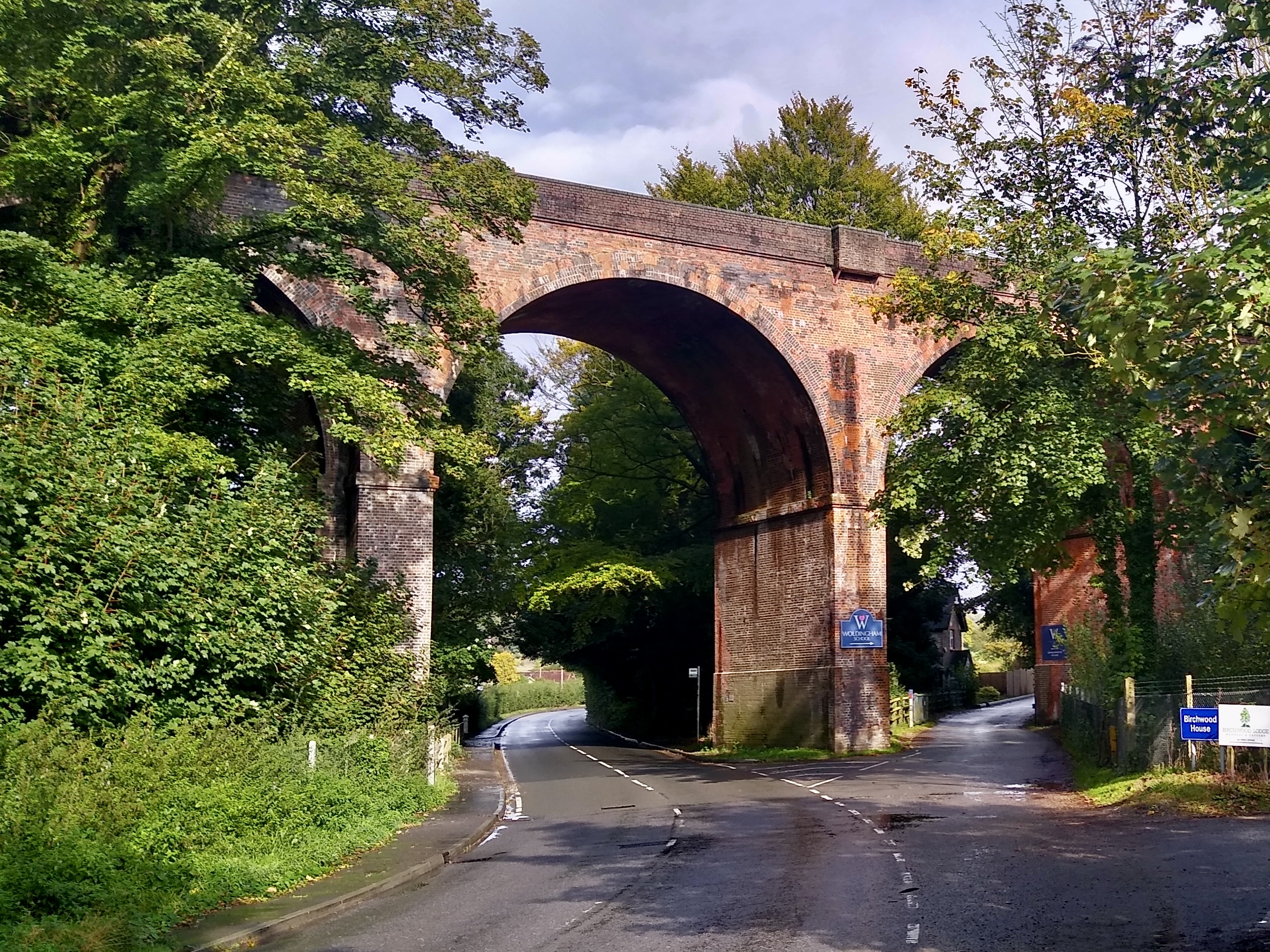
Woldingham Viaduct, completed before work ceased in 1869

The Surrey and Sussex Junction Railway (SSJR) was an abortive railway scheme to link Croydon to Tunbridge Wells, via Oxted. The company obtained powers to build the line, with the intention that it would be worked by the London Brighton and South Coast Railway (LB&SCR). The project was abandoned, before completion, in 1867. Much of the trackbed was used in the 1880s for the construction of the Oxted line.

== History ==
Surrey and Sussex Junction Railway Act 1865
- Act of Parliament
- Parliament of the United Kingdom
- Long title: An Act for making certain Railways from the London, Brighton, and South Coast Railway to the East Grinstead, Groombridge, and Tunbridge Wells Railway, and to the Brighton, Uckfield, and Tunbridge Wells Railway; and for other Purposes.
- Citation: 28 & 29 Vict. c. ccclxxix

Dates
- Royal assent: 6 July 1865

The railway originated as an independent scheme drawn up by several former officers and directors of the LB&SCR in 1864 to link Croydon to Tunbridge Wells, via Oxted. The intention was that the line, once built, would be worked by, or else leased to, the LB&SCR. An act of Parliament, the Surrey and Sussex Junction Railway Act 1865 (28 & 29 Vict. c. ccclxxix), was granted in July 1865. It authorised the SSJR to build a railway from Croydon to Groombridge, where there was to be a junction with the East Grinstead to Tunbridge Wells line.

The scheme was controversial as the SSJR was sponsored by the LB&SCR, but ran into parts of Surrey and East Sussex which were considered South Eastern Railway (SER) territory. In retaliation, the SER put forward proposals for a new "London, Lewes and Brighton" railway, together with the London Chatham and Dover Railway.

London, Brighton and South Coast and Surrey and Sussex Junction Railway Companies' Amalgamation Act 1869
- Act of Parliament
- Parliament of the United Kingdom
- Long title: An Act for the amalgamation of the Surrey and Sussex Junction Railway with the London, Brighton, and South Coast Railway; and for other Purposes.
- Citation: 32 & 33 Vict. c. lxxii

Dates
- Royal assent: 12 July 1869

Construction of the SSJR was slow, in part because of the 1866 financial panic caused by failure of Overend, Gurney and Company. In 1869, there was a riot at Edenbridge because Belgian navvies were being employed to build the line instead of local labourers. A second act of Parliament, the London, Brighton and South Coast and Surrey and Sussex Junction Railway Companies' Amalgamation Act 1869 (32 & 33 Vict. c. lxxii), was obtained to transfer the line formally to the LB&SCR, which immediately asked for powers to suspend works. The company paid a penalty of £32,250 and construction ceased immediately. (Note: Construction of the Ouse Valley Railway, which was to have linked Lindfield, Uckfield, Hailsham and Bexhill-on-Sea, was similarly abandoned by the LB&SCR in 1868.)

By the time works ceased in 1869, the SSJR had completed the brick, four-arch Woldingham Viaduct. Substantial progress had been made on the construction of the 2,267 yd long (2.073 km) Oxted Tunnel, although sources disagree as to whether breakthrough had been achieved. Excavation of the Riddlesdown, Limpsfield and Mark Beech Tunnels had also begun.

No work took place on the unfinished railway line until 1878, when the London, Brighton, and South Coast Railway (Croydon, Oxted, and East Grinstead Railways) Act 1878 authorised the Croydon, Oxted and East Grinstead (CO&EGR) railway. The new company took over much of the uncompleted SSJR trackbed between South Croydon and Hurst Green, from where its line would run south to East Grinstead. The railway historian, Alan Jackson, writes that the 10 mi (16 km) of line north of Oxted was "practically identical" to the SSJR route. However, the abandoned and incomplete Limpsfield Tunnel workings had collapsed and so a new tunnel was bored, immediately to the east. The Riddlesdown and Oxted Viaducts were constructed by the CO&EGR to a design by Henry Wallis using wrought iron girders, in preference to building in brick, as intended by the SSJR. The South Croydon–East Grinstead line finally opened to passenger traffic on 10 March 1884.

The general alignment of the southern part of the SSJR (between Hurst Green and Groombridge) was followed by the Oxted and Groombridge Railway (O&GR), authorised in 1881. There were significant differences in the two routes, including the length of Mark Beech Tunnel, the construction of which was started by the SSJR. Originally intended to be 1,100 yd (1,000 m) long, the tunnel was 1,338 yd (1,223 m) long when completed by the O&GR. In 1884, the LB&SCR was authorised to acquire the O&GR and the line opened on 2 January 1888.

== Bibliography ==
- Gould, David (2003). The Croydon, Oxted & East Grinstead Railway. Usk: Oakwood Press. ISBN 978-0-85-361598-9.
- Gray, Adrian (1990). South Eastern Railway. Midhurst: Middleton Press. ISBN 978-0-90-652085-7.
- Jackson, Alan A. (1999). The railway in Surrey. Penryn: Atlantic Transport Publishers. ISBN 978-0-90-689990-8.
- Kidner, R.W. (1972). The Oxted Line. Tarrant Hinton: Oakwood Press. ISBN 978-0-85-361103-5.
- Turner, J.T. Howard (1978). The London, Brighton & South Coast Railway. Vol. 2 : Establishment and growth. London: B.T. Batsford. ISBN 978-0-71-341198-0.
- Turner, J.T. Howard (1979). The London, Brighton & South Coast Railway. Vol. 3 : Completion and maturity. London: B.T. Batsford. ISBN 978-0-71-341389-2.
