= Tunbridge Wells West railway station =

Station in Tunbridge Wells, Kent, England

Coordinates: 51.12315°N 0.25349°E

Tunbridge Wells West
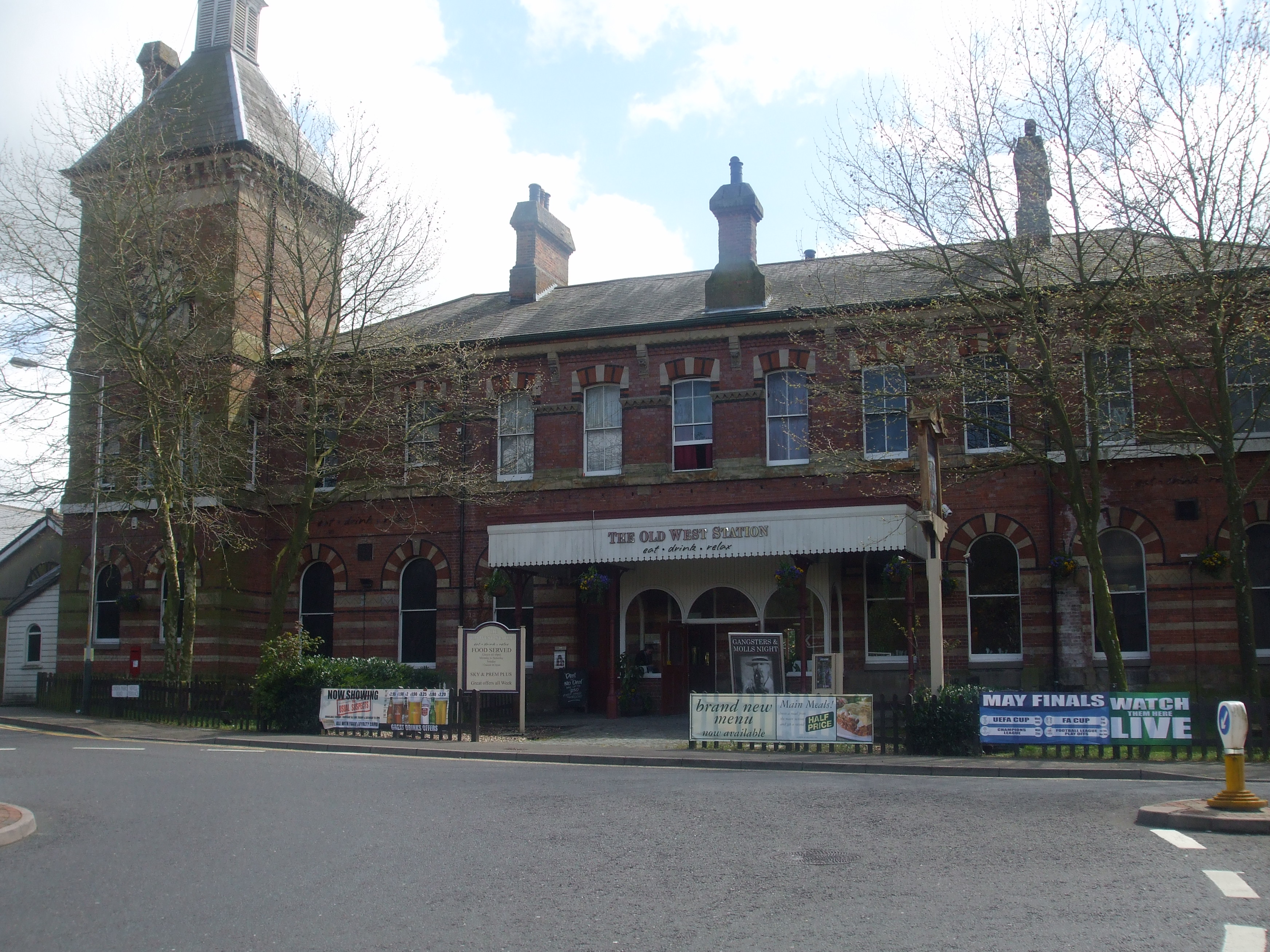

General information
- Location: Kent; England
- Grid reference: TQ578384
- System: Station on heritage railway
- Owner: Southern Railway; Southern Region of British Railways; Spa Valley Railway
- Manager: London, Brighton and South Coast Railway
- Platforms: 1 (originally 5)

Key dates
- 1 October 1866: Opened (Tunbridge Wells)
- 22 August 1923: Renamed (Tunbridge Wells West)
- 4 September 1961: Goods facilities withdrawn
- 8 July 1985: Closed to passengers
- 10 August 1985: closed completely
- 21 December 1996: New station on site opened by Spa Valley Railway
Location

Tunbridge Wells West is a railway station located in Royal Tunbridge Wells, Kent, England. It is one of two railway stations in Tunbridge Wells constructed by rival companies. The other, Tunbridge Wells Central was opened in 1845 by the South Eastern Railway (SER). Tunbridge Wells West was closed to mainline passenger services in 1985. A new station on part of the site has been opened as a heritage railway line opened in 1996. It stands next to the original engine shed which has been restored to use. The line is called the Spa Valley Railway.

== Opening ==
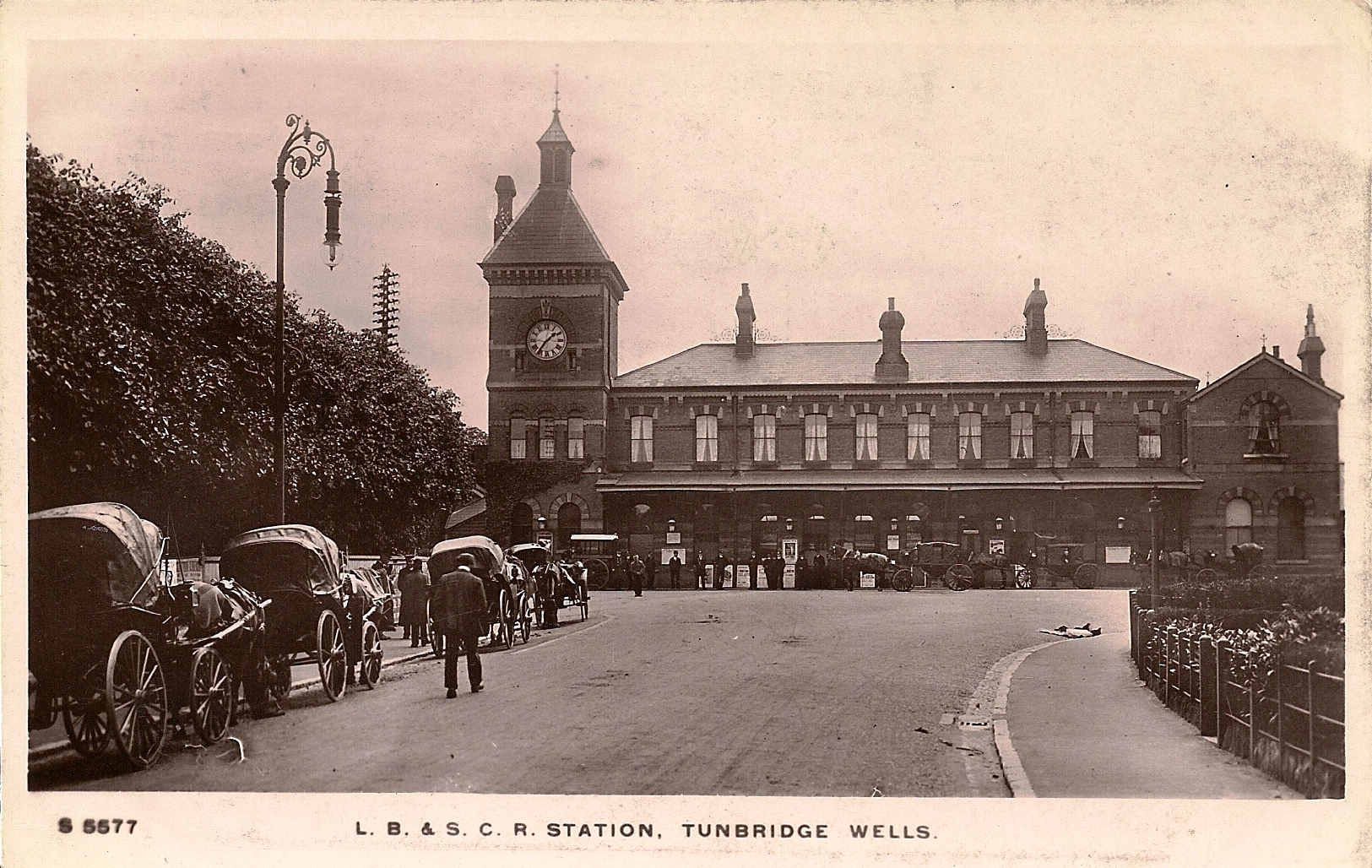
The Station Approach in the early 1900s. A Yablochkov candle can be seen on the left of the picture.

The station was opened in 1866 by the London, Brighton and South Coast Railway (LBSCR), as the eastern terminus of the East Grinstead, Groombridge and Tunbridge Wells Railway (EGGTWR), itself an extension to the Three Bridges to East Grinstead Railway, which had been completed in 1855.

The station buildings were designed by Charles Henry Driver.

Engineered by the LBSCR's Chief Engineer Frederick Banister as part of the EGGTWR, the station was built as part of a race between the LBSCR and SER conducted during the 1860s for access to the town; "the LBSC was becoming concerned at threatened incursions by the [SER] on its territory. So a battle was on. Tunbridge Wells was first reached from East Grinstead in 1866 via Groombridge. Two years later, with the South Eastern Railway (SER) looking towards Lewes, the London, Brighton and South Coast Railway countered with a line from Groombridge to Uckfield."

From Tunbridge Wells West there were direct services to the South Coast at Brighton and Eastbourne and to London Victoria. The Victoria services ran via Groombridge and Ashurst. As a sign outside the station proudly proclaimed, "New Route to London: Shortest, Quickest and Most Direct. Frequent Express Trains."

== Station buildings ==
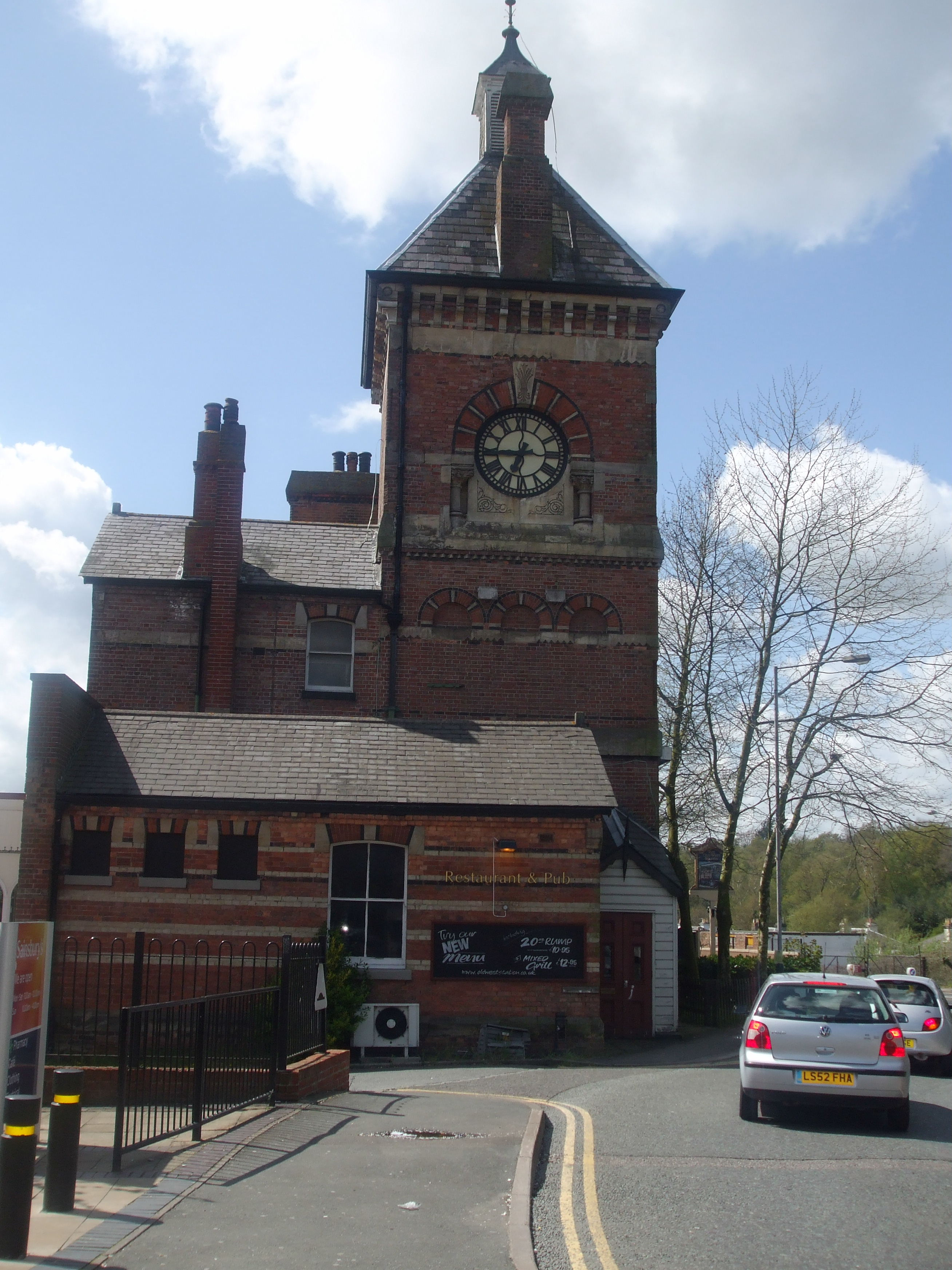
Station clocktower

The imposing two-storey main station building was most likely designed by the LBSCR's Chief Engineer, F. Dale Bannister, who was responsible for other stations on the line. Called the "St. Pancras of the Weald" by the Wealden Line Campaign, it was a statement of intent to local inhabitants by the LBSCR which was establishing the limits of its territory. The station is composed of a central block flanked on the western side by a gable-fronted wing, and on the eastern side by a three-storey clocktower with a pyramidal slate roof surrounded by a louvred cupola with a weathervane. The facade of the building is constructed of red brick with ashlar and black brick dressings; on the ground floor level are a series of nine round-arched windows and an arched doorway, with a decorated ashlar impost band connecting the windows. The eaves are serrated with an ashlar cornice. Inside the building was a gas-lit booking hall with four ticket windows and a panelled ceiling supported by arches springing from stone columns.

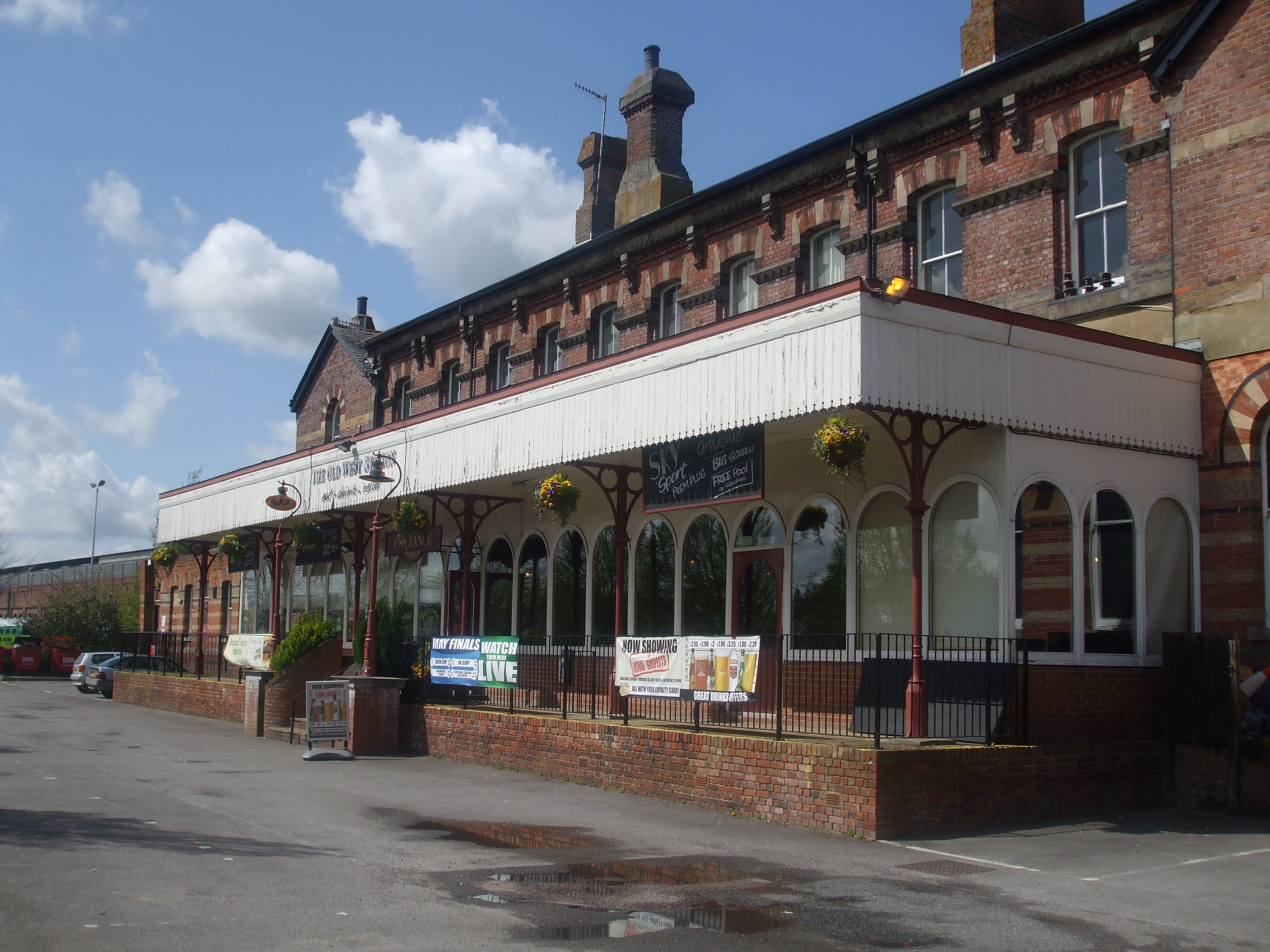
Station platform from the north-west

The station's facilities were much larger than those at Tunbridge Wells Central. The passenger station originally had five platform roads: three serving long platforms (two of which were island platforms) and two other shorter bay platforms. The reason for the station's extensive layout was that it served no fewer than six different routes: three of which bifurcated at or near Groombridge and two at Eridge. The station was self-contained on one site which incorporated a substantial goods yard, motive power depot and carriage sidings. The station yard was controlled by two signalboxes, one at the west end with 45 levers (first known as "Tunbridge Wells West West" then as the "A Box"), and the other at the east end by Montacute Road Bridge (variously named "East Cabin", "No. 2 Box" and "B Box"). The A Box also controlled roads to the locomotive shed and carriage sidings.

=== Motive Power Depot ===
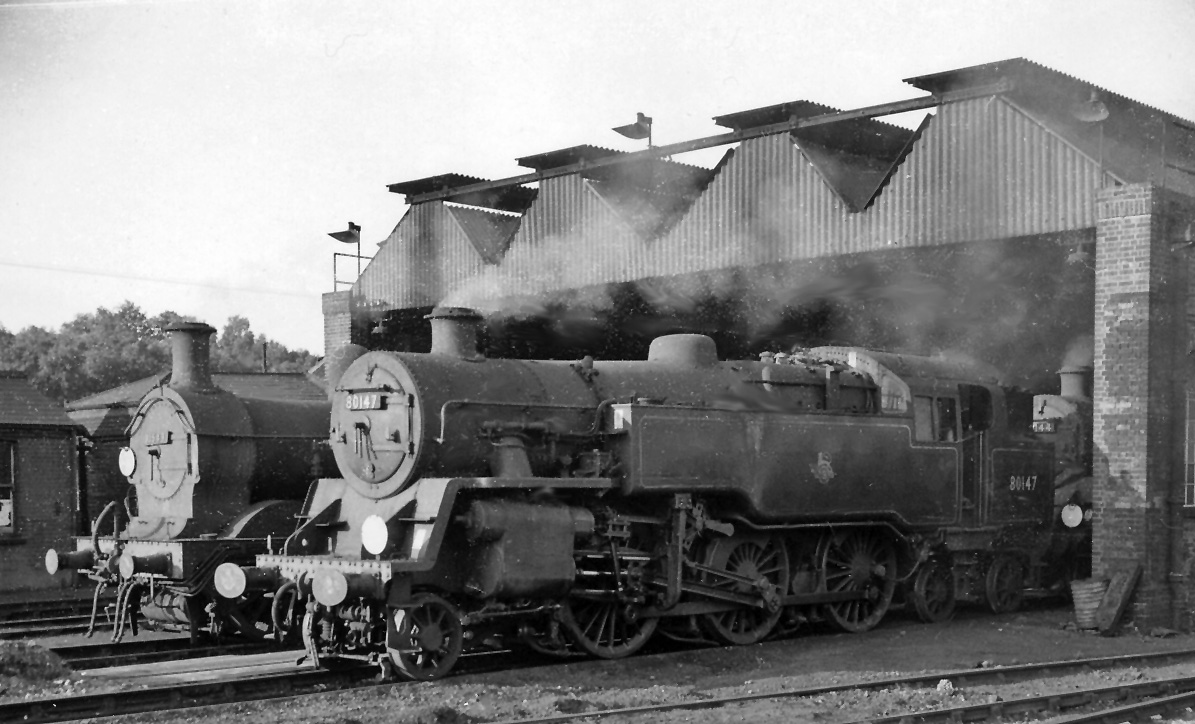
The depot in 1961

The original two-road locomotive shed (code number 75F) was capable of accommodating six engines and situated to the south of the station. It was opened in 1866 and replaced in 1891 by a larger four-road shed located to the north-west of the station. Following bomb damage on 20 November 1940 during the Second World War, the slate roof of the engine shed was replaced with corrugated asbestos. It was closed to steam locos in June 1965 but the tracks were used for storage of engineers rolling stock until the late 1970s when they were removed.

== Grove Junction ==
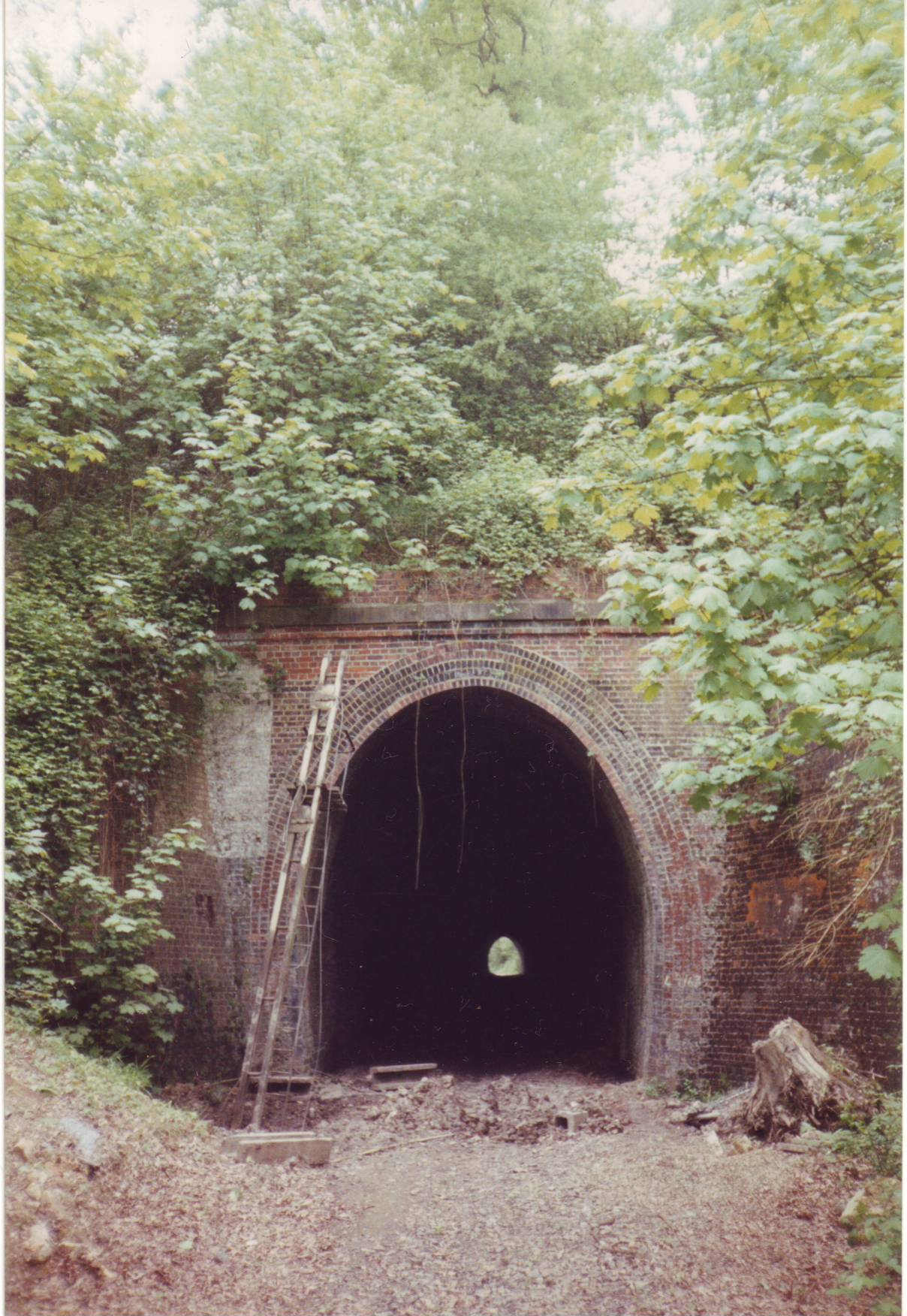
Eastern portal of Grove Tunnel

Although initially conceived as a terminus station, an agreement between the SER and the LBSCR saw Tunbridge Wells West linked by a short spur to the Hastings Line thereby connecting it with the Central station. The spur came about as a consequence of the intense rivalry between the two railway companies which in 1864 had led to both simultaneously depositing bills before Parliament for competing routes across the south-east. The LBSCR obtained authorisation to construct the Ouse Valley Railway, whilst the SER proposed a new line to Eastbourne.

Conscious of the threat that the SER's line would pose to the Cuckoo Line, the LBSCR managed to persuade the SER to withdraw its proposal in return for a construction of a spur between the two stations in Tunbridge Wells. A short single-track spur was therefore opened from Tunbridge Wells West through Grove Tunnel after which the track curved north to join the main Hastings Line towards Tunbridge Wells Central, enabling through-running to the Hastings Line and the Brighton Main Line from the West station.

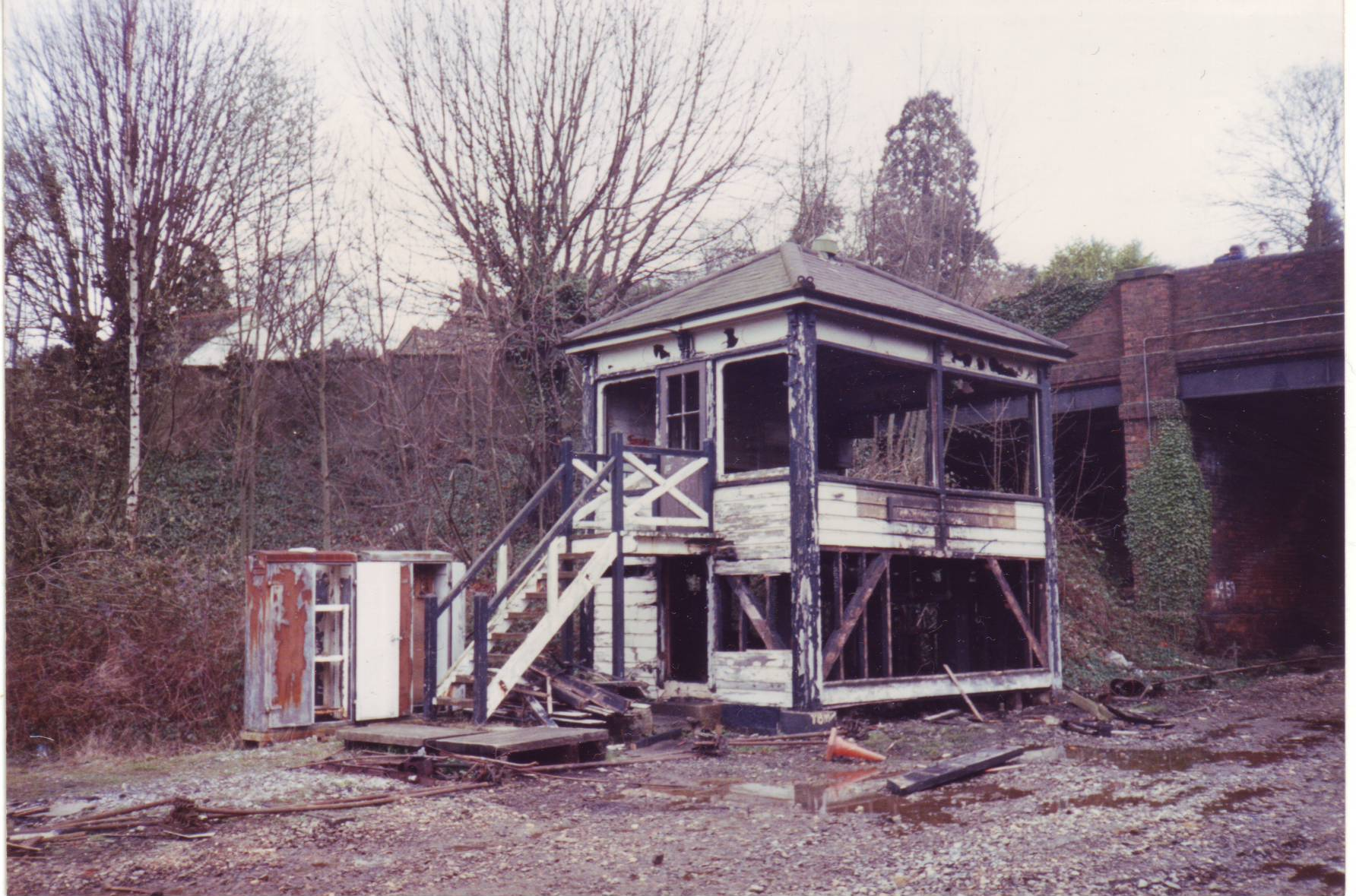
Derelict "B" signalbox, c1986

An LBSCR goods service first used the spur from 1 October 1866, but the introduction of a passenger service was delayed until 1 February 1876. Even by 1894, only 5 passenger services and 1 goods train were using the spur in a down direction from the Central station. Usage did however increase when the Southern Railway took over the line following the grouping and in 1924, 9 down passenger services used it. By 1952, this had increased to 13, and in 1958, to 29 plus one goods service each way, which made the spur one of the busiest single-track sections anywhere in the country. Through-running on the Cuckoo Line had been possible since 5 April 1880 when the LBSCR extended the line from Hailsham to Eridge which enabled services to run through to Tunbridge Wells West.

== Operations ==
=== Early years ===
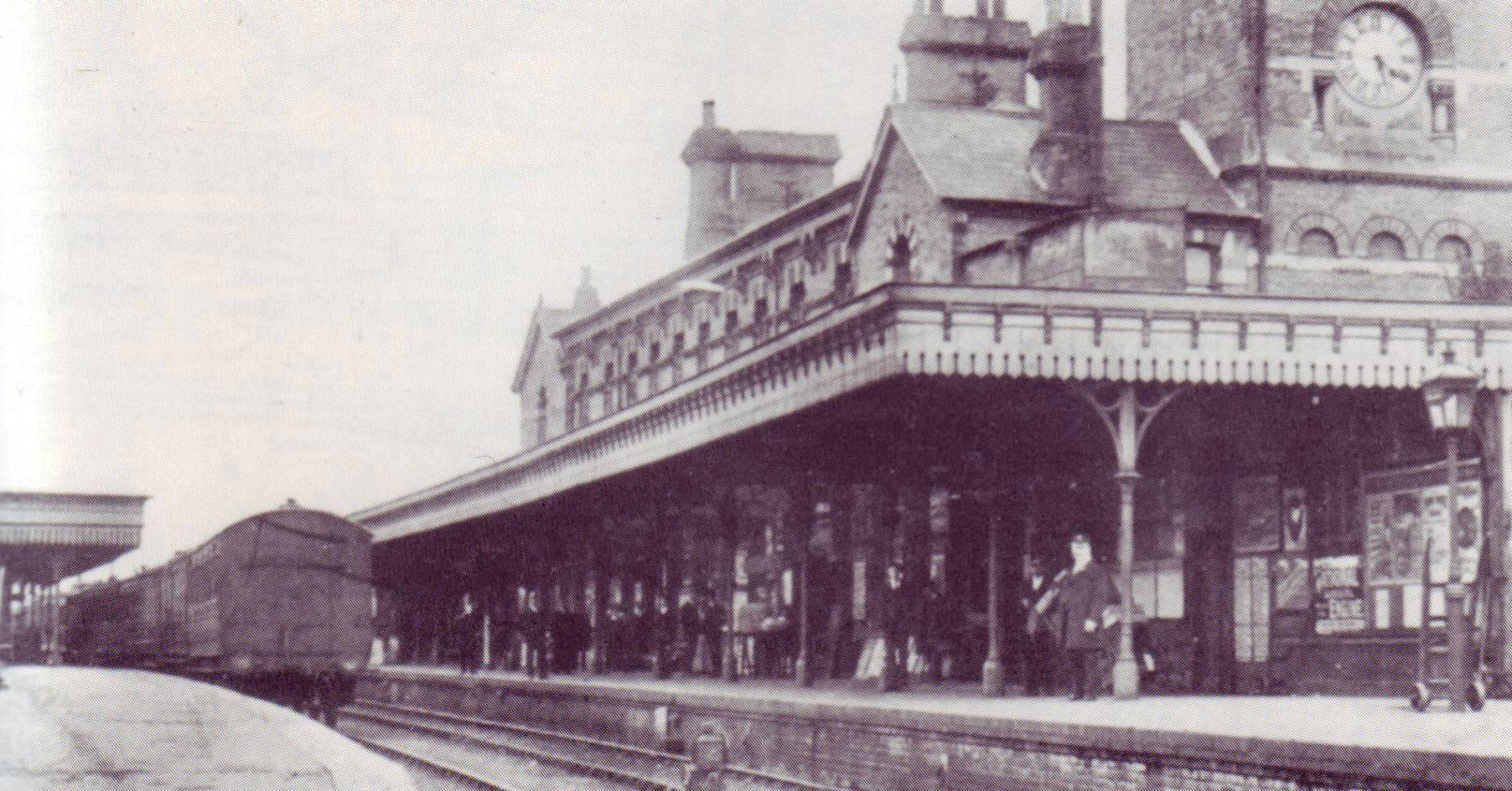
The Station Platforms in 1904; the island platform can be seen on the left.

In 1903 Buffalo Bill caused a storm when the special train carrying his famous show arrived at Tunbridge Wells West for a performance. Crowds of onlookers watched as the horses and coach involved in the show's "Deadwood Stage ambush event" dashed out of the circus marquee to head directly to the station where covered wagons were waiting to take them to their next venue. One of the bay platforms was subsequently nicknamed the "Jumbo Platform" - a name arising from the days when circus trains were unloaded at the station and the elephants were marched along the street to the circus site on nearby Tunbridge Wells Common.

=== Post-grouping ===
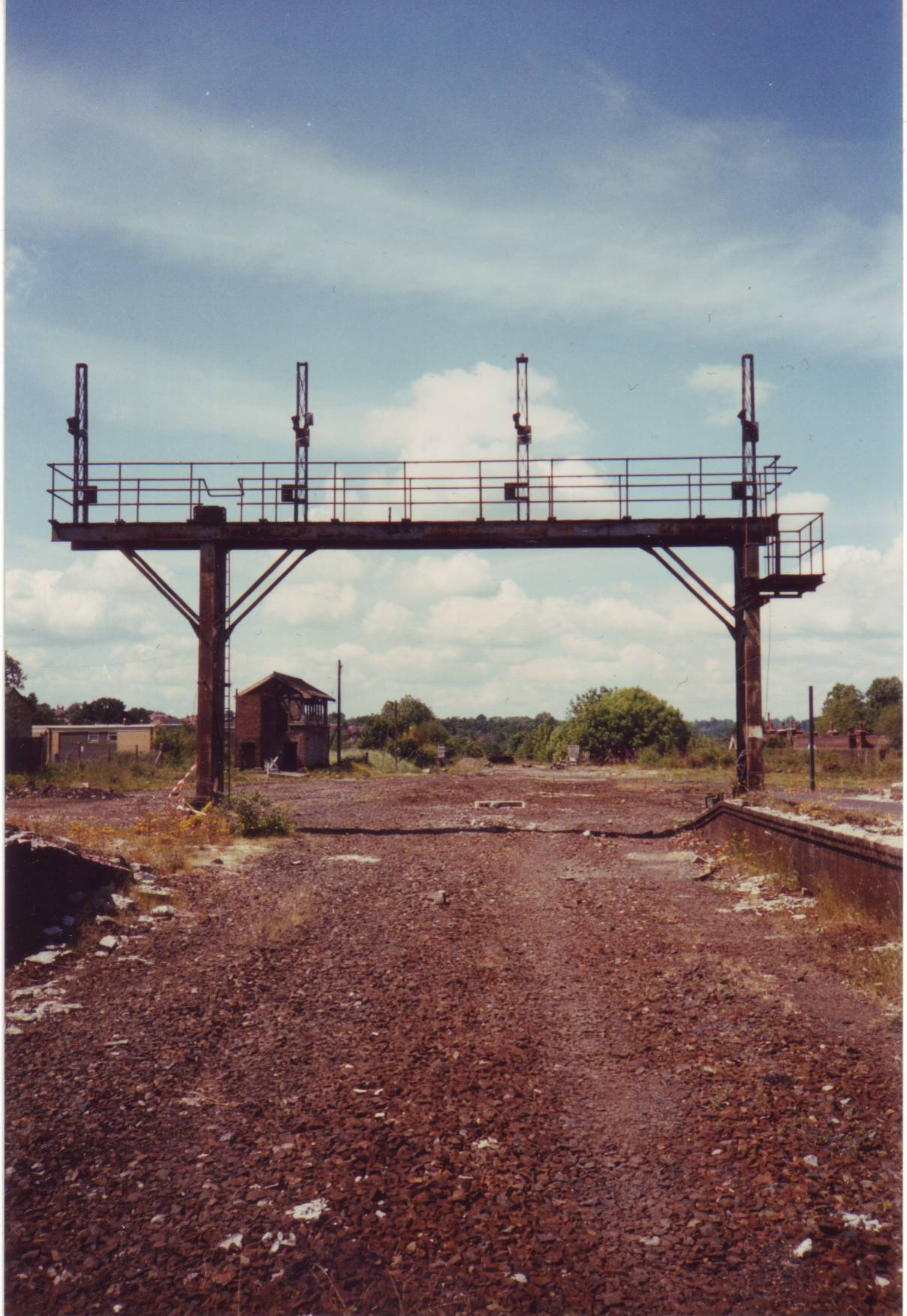
Signals gantry

In 1923 following the grouping ordered by the Railways Act 1921, the station passed into the ownership of the Southern Railway (SR). The SR added the suffix "West" to the station's name on 22 August 1923, in order to distinguish it from the other Tunbridge Wells station, which was named "Central". This period saw the station become very popular with cross-country services with over 100 trains passing each day. From Groombridge to Tunbridge Wells West alone there were 83 workings, with trains proceeding to three destinations - Three Bridges, Brighton via the Oxted Line and Eastbourne via the Cuckoo Line. The spur saw little use by 1925 - four daily workings to Brighton and two to Uckfield.

=== 1950s heyday ===
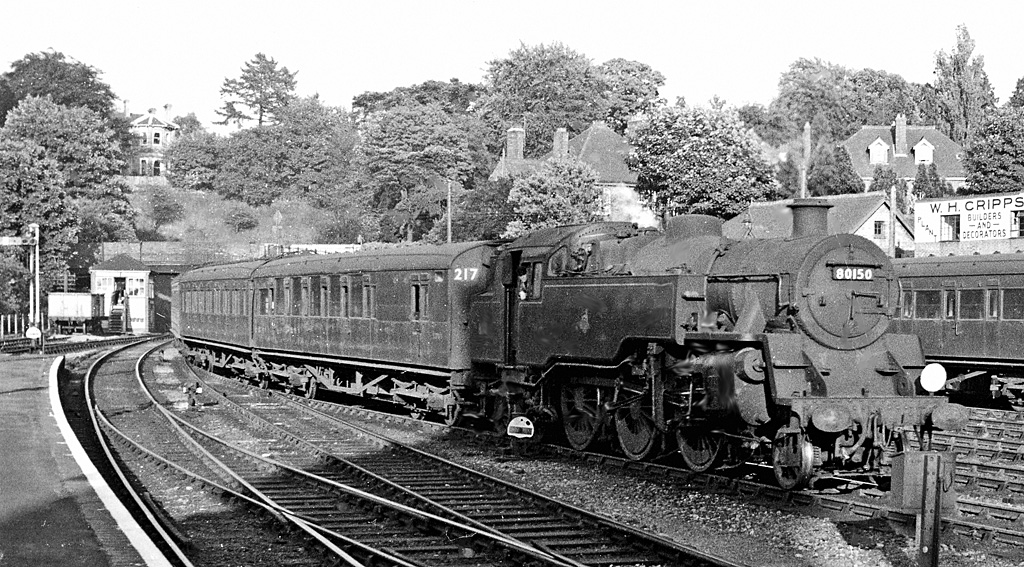
Tonbridge - Brighton train in 1961

With the introduction of the 1955 summer timetables, the services between London and Tunbridge Wells were entirely revised and the number of stopping passenger trains increased. On a normal weekday 136 trains called at Tunbridge Wells West: 66 departures and 70 arrivals; there were also nine goods trains (five in and four out) daily. In an 18-hour period between 6 am and midnight, on average one passenger train departed or arrived every eight minutes.

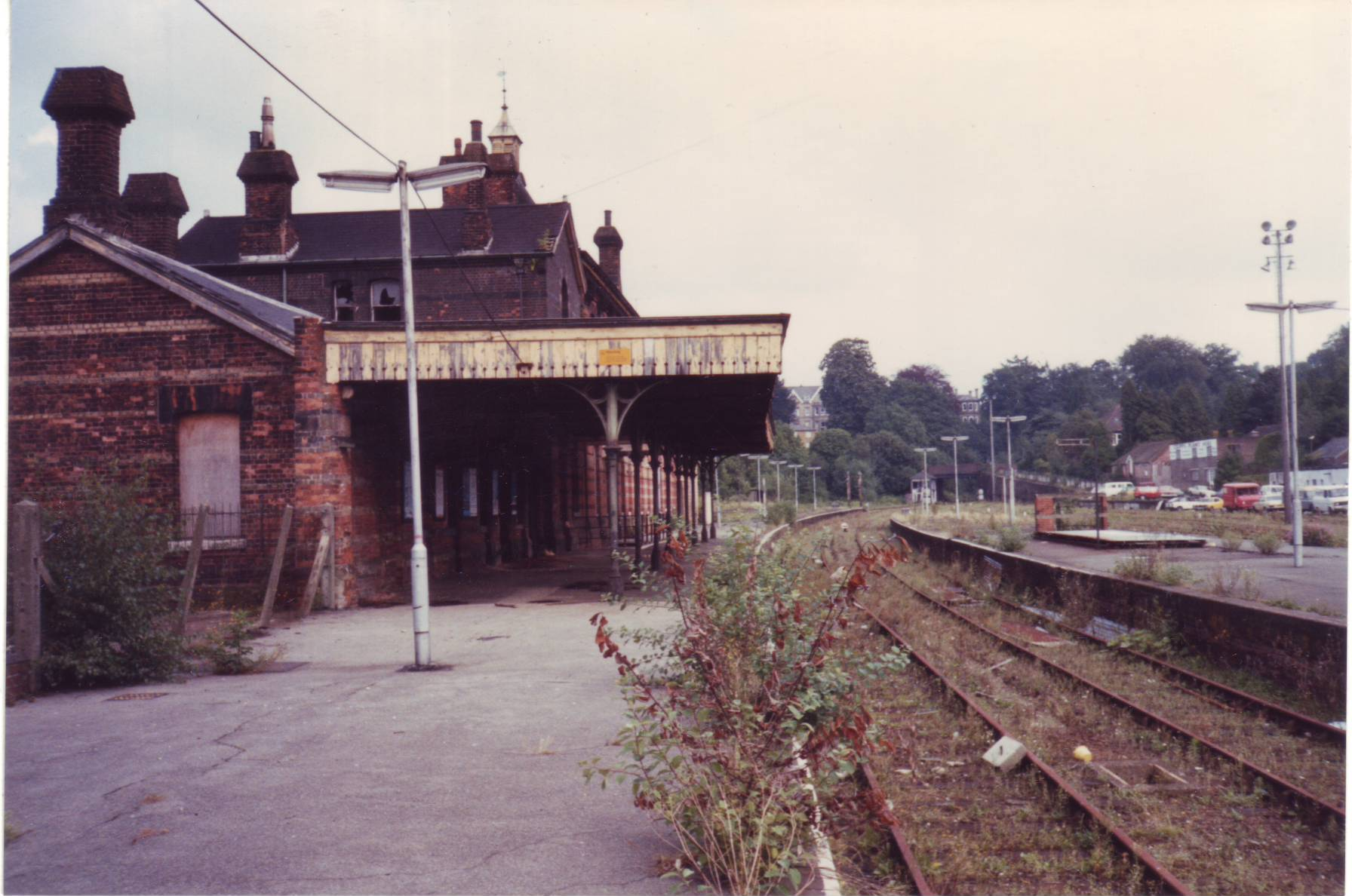
Main station platform, c1986

The six routes served were: (1) Oxted and London via Edenbridge Town; (2) Oxted and London via East Grinstead; (3) Three Bridges via East Grinstead; (4) Uckfield, Lewes and Brighton; (5) Heathfield, Hailsham and Eastbourne; and (6) Tonbridge and Sevenoaks via Tunbridge Wells Central.

Preceding station	Disused railways	Following station
High Rocks Halt	British Rail; Southern Region; Cuckoo Line; Wealden Line; Three Bridges to Tunbridge Wells	Tunbridge Wells; Central

== Decline and closure ==
Notice announcing the Station's closure in 1985

As the popularity of the motor car increased, train services were severely cut back due to the lack of patronage, and the number of services passing through Tunbridge Wells West declined as one line after another was closed from the 1950s onwards. First, the Cuckoo Line in 1965, the Three Bridges to Groombridge in 1967, and finally the Uckfield to Lewes Line in 1969. Tunbridge Wells West was itself listed for closure in 1966, only to be subsequently reprieved. The line to Tunbridge Wells West remained open, although in its latter years passenger services were mainly confined to a shuttle service between Tonbridge (via the single line connection to Tunbridge Wells Central - now plain Tunbridge Wells) and Eridge with a few through trains to Uckfield; however there was a depot at the station which housed rolling stock for services on the Uckfield and East Grinstead - London (via East Croydon) lines, and there were plenty of empty stock moves early and late in the day.

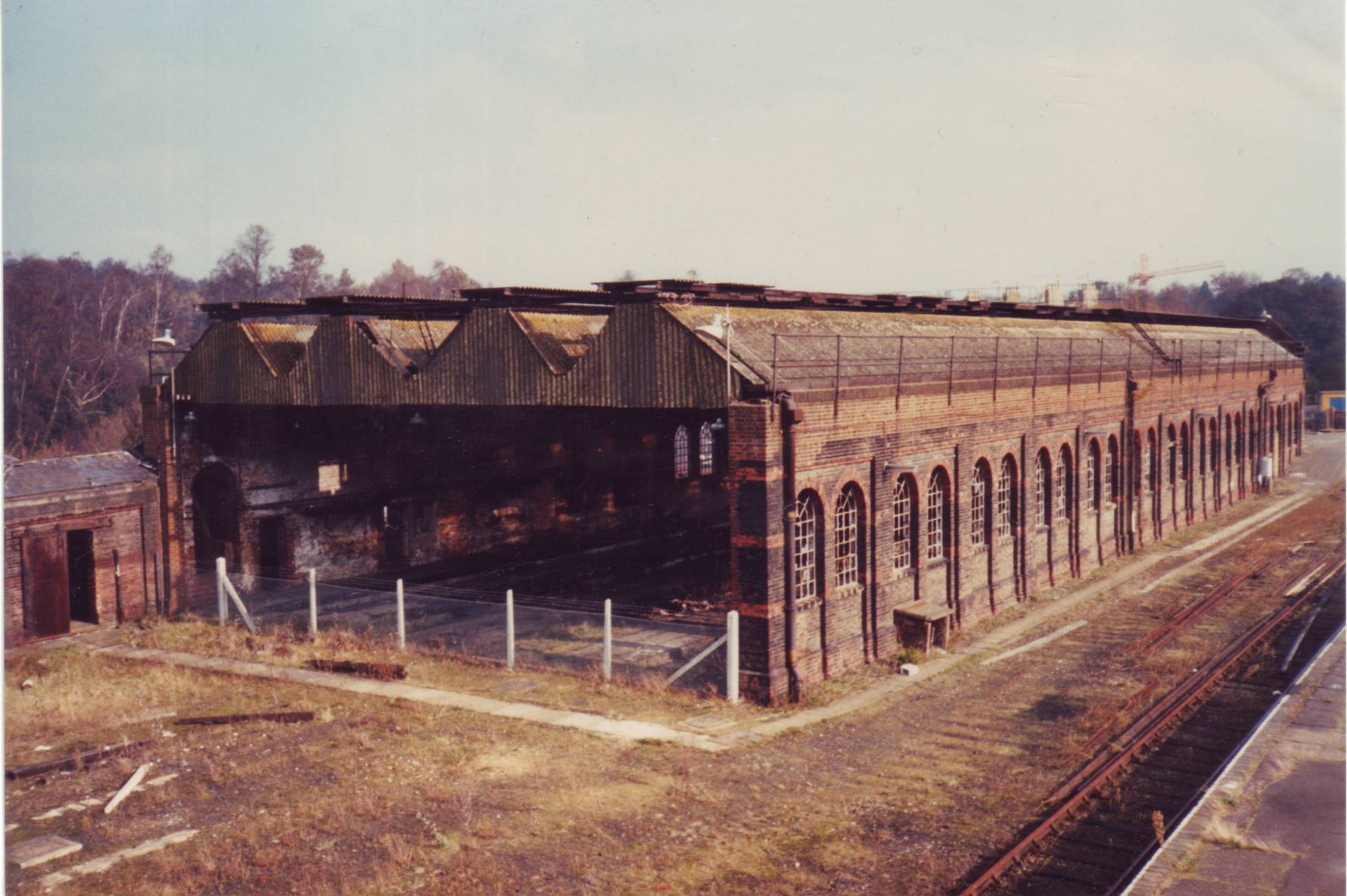
Derelict locomotive shed, c1986

Following a total lack of investment for decades (since Beeching spending on anything other than essential repairs was non-existent), by the early 1980s the track and signalling needed to be replaced. British Rail, at the time were planning an upgrade of the Tonbridge to Hastings Line which included the renewal of Grove Junction, decided that the cost of keeping the line from Eridge to the Central station open and undertaking the works, some £175,000, did not justify the outlay. It therefore announced the proposed closure of the line (including Groombridge and the West station) from 16 May 1983 which was later deferred after public objections. The Secretary of State for Transport agreed to the withdrawal of passenger services which took effect from 8 July 1985, although the section between Tunbridge Wells West and Birchden Jn remained open for rolling stock movements until 10 August, when the depot at the West station was shut. At the time of closure Tunbridge Wells West station had gas lighting, which was in operation in the ticket office and under the canopy.

== Revival ==
=== Spa Valley Railway ===
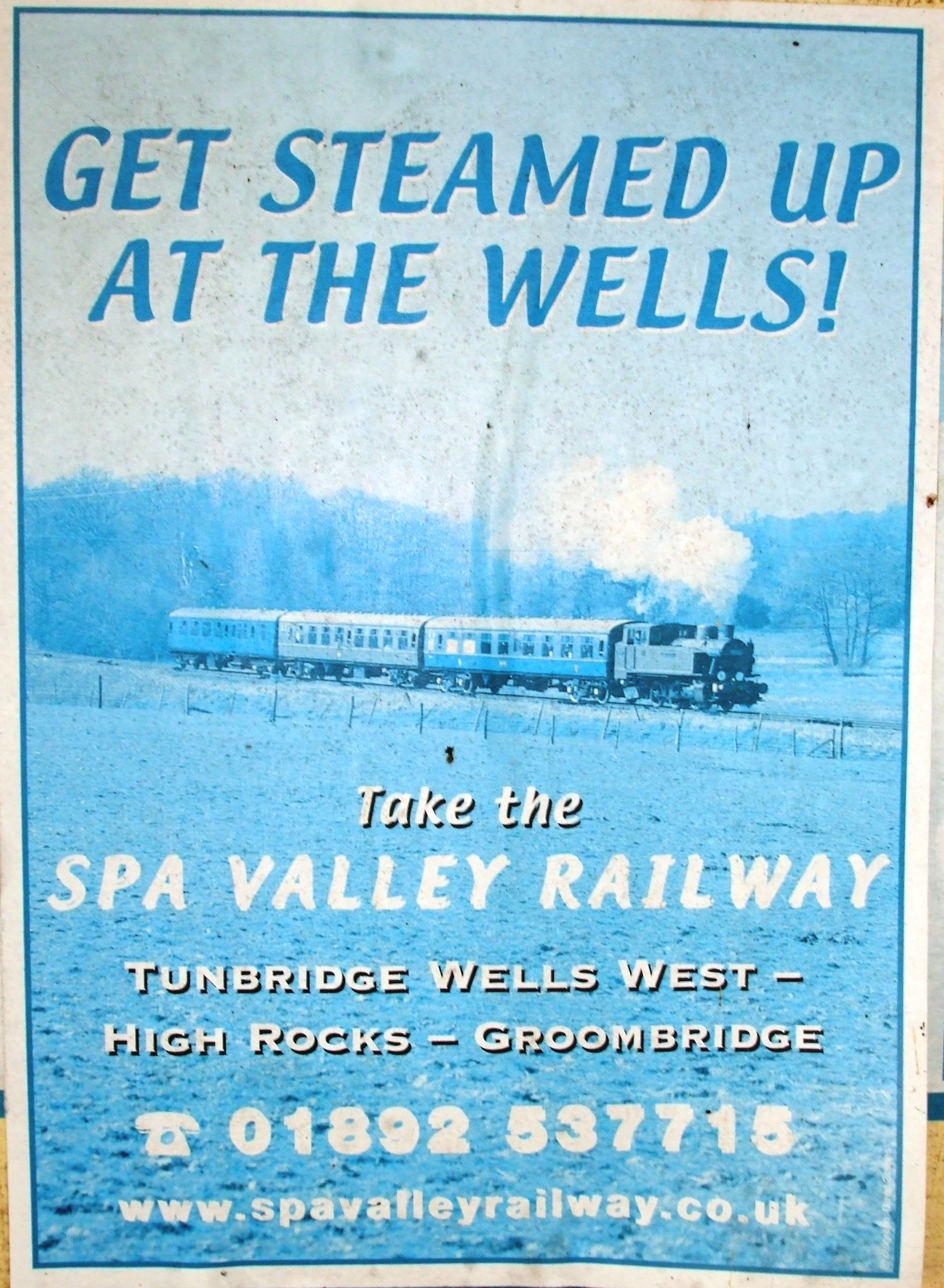
Spa Valley Railway Poster

More than 20 years after its closure, Tunbridge Wells West is once again a busy railway station and depot. Passenger services using heritage trains now run on the Spa Valley Railway (SVR) between Tunbridge Wells West to Eridge, via High Rocks and Groombridge. After an 11-year struggle - during which Tunbridge Wells Borough Council gave planning permission for the construction of a Sainsbury's supermarket complex on the site of the derelict goods yard - in 1996 the Society acquired the trackbed of the former line as far as Birchden Junction. Alongside the former LB&SCR loco shed a new platform was built, from where services began running to Cold Bath Bridge (about 0.75-mile away) in December 1996. Services were extended to Groombridge in August 1997, and Birchden Junction in 2005. After the successful "Return to Eridge" appeal to raise £500,000 for the extension to the Uckfield main line at Eridge, railway re-connected the line to Eridge on 25 March 2011

Preceding station	Heritage railways	Following station
High Rocks towards Eridge	Spa Valley Railway	Terminus

=== Station buildings ===
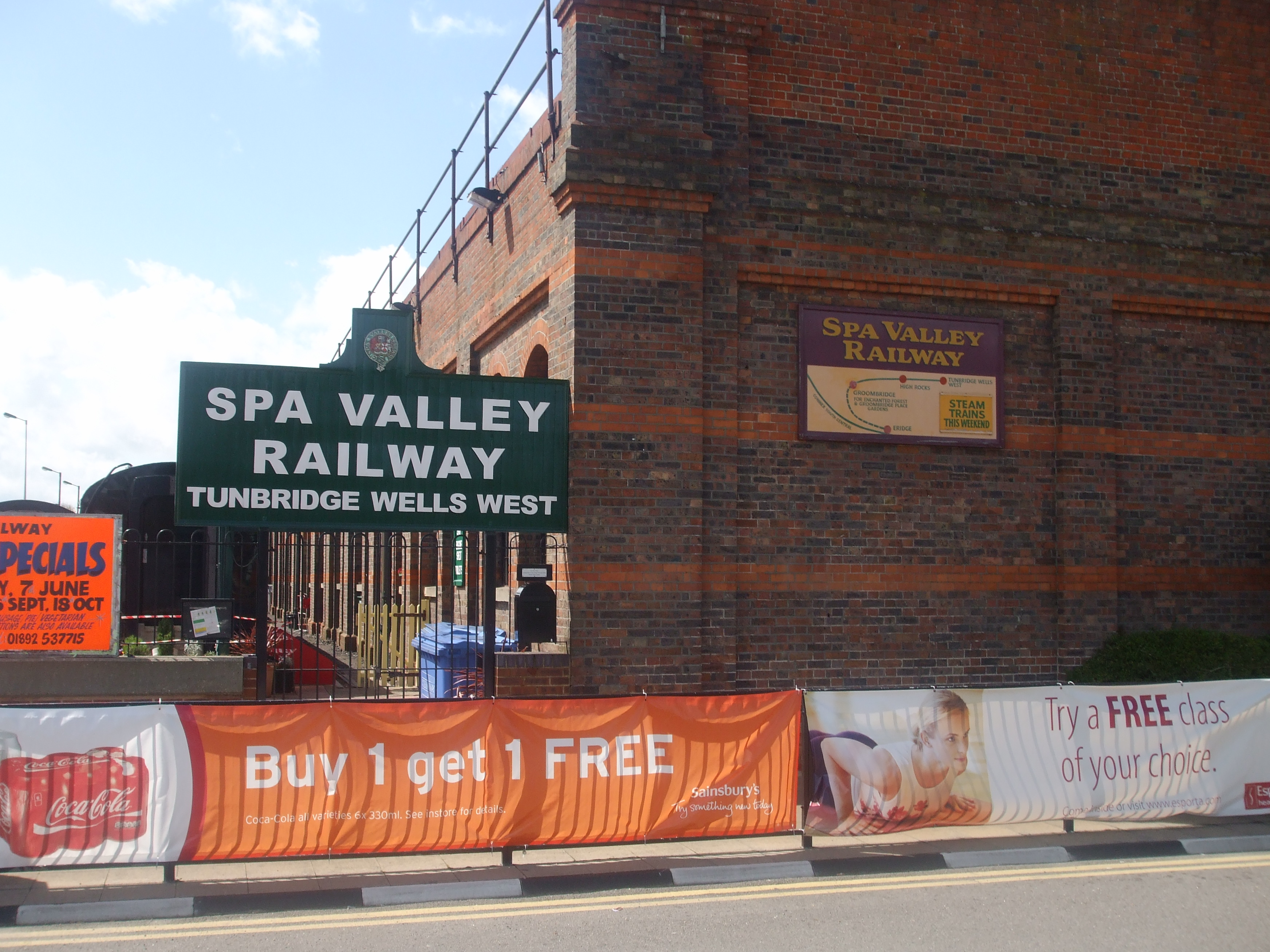
Spa Valley Railway operations in former Engine Shed

Following closure of the station, the main building was converted into a Beefeater restaurant named "The Old West Station", before being purchased by Herald Inns and Bars which operate it under the same name as a pub-cum-restaurant. It is now a Smith & Western. The building was Grade II listed on 27 March 1986. The former goods yard and stabling sidings are lost under a Sainsbury's supermarket and a Homebase, and the trackbed was made into a car park and the frontage to the supermarket. An agreed corridor was left alongside Linden Park Road to enable any reinstated line to run through the site and a formal agreement was concluded between Tunbridge Wells Borough Council and Lord Sainsbury whereby the company agreed that, if required, they will remove at their own cost any buildings obstructing the path of the railway. In the mid-1990s, a toilet block was constructed on the corridor, but this could be demolished in accordance with the terms of the agreement.

The spur to Grove Junction remains in an overgrown state; it was sold for £1 in 2001 to Railway Paths Ltd (a subsidiary of Sustrans), but is protected by covenants ensuring that it can only be used for railway purposes; the section is also safeguarded from development in the East Sussex and Brighton and Hove Structure Plan 1991–2011 as well as the Wealden Local Plan. Tunbridge Wells Borough Council has acknowledged the "considerable benefits" that the line's reopening would bring to the local community and economy, whilst at the same time admitting that this will not happen in the "near future". An inspection carried out by Mott MacDonald in 1997 revealed that £100,000 would be required to bring Grove Tunnel back up to operating standards.

== Future ==
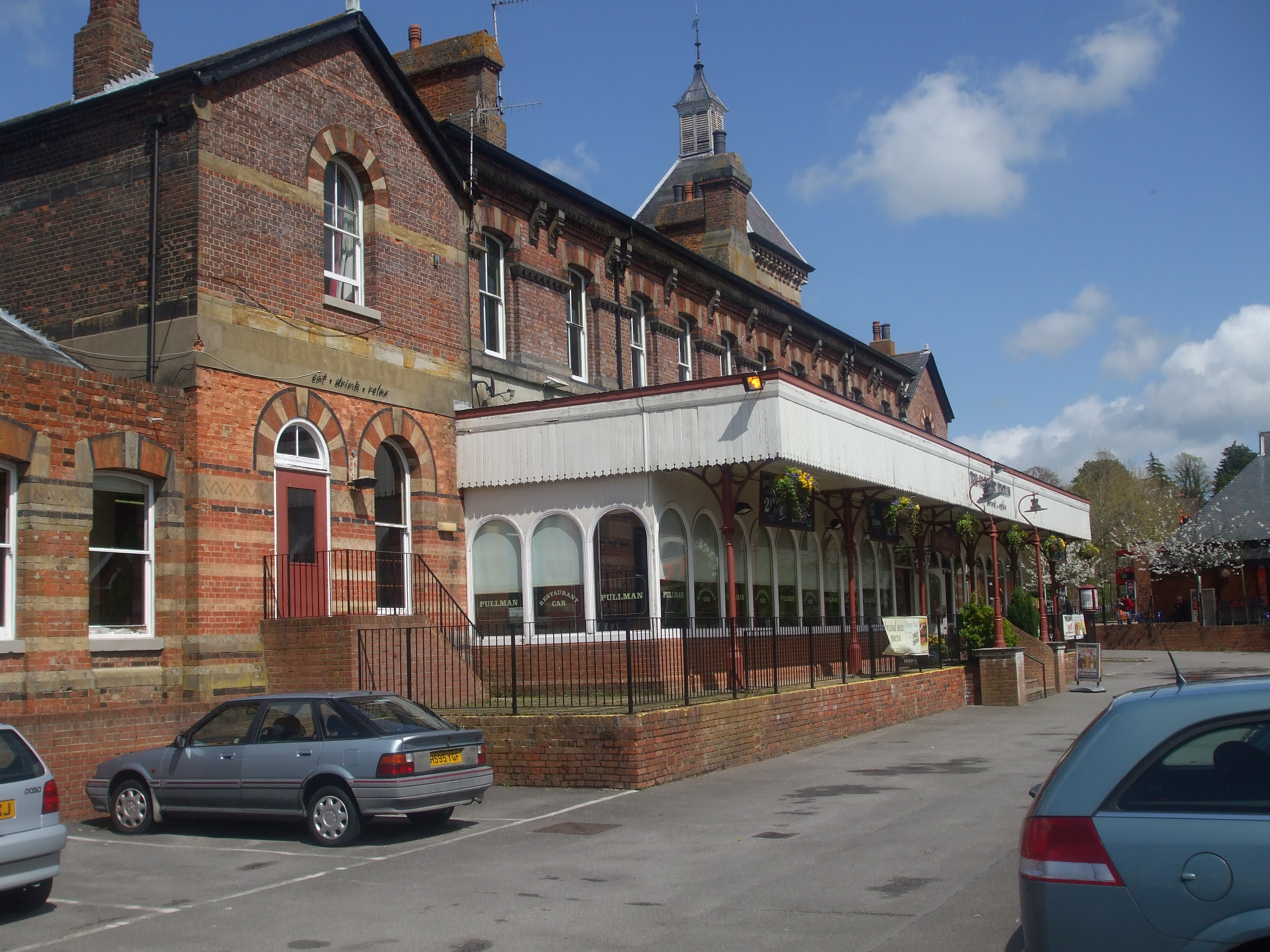
Converted station building from the north-east

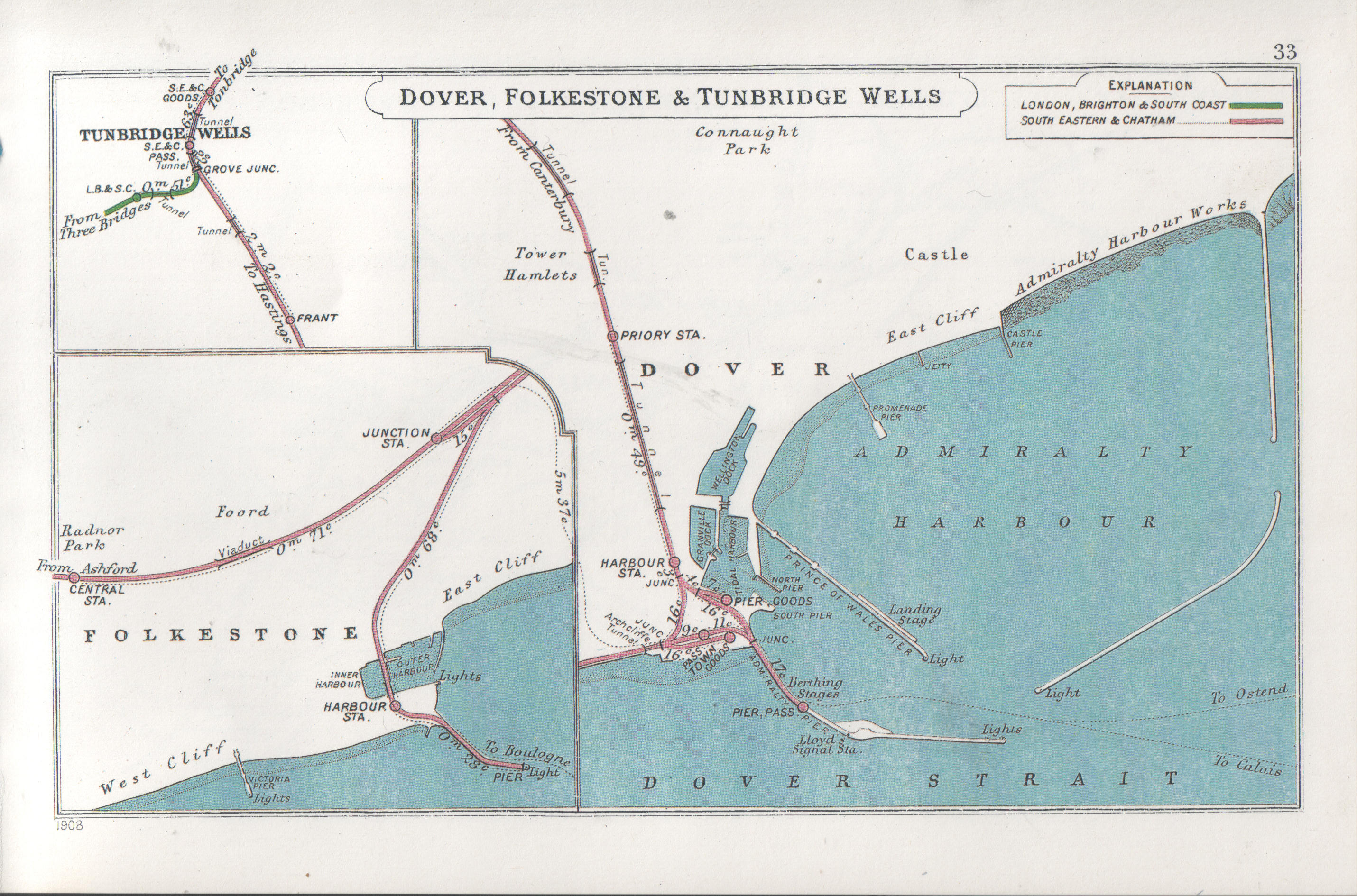
A 1908 Railway Clearing House map of lines around Tunbridge Wells (upper left). Tunbridge Wells West is in green labelled L.B.&S.C.

A reopening campaign has been run by the Wealden Line Campaign since 1986, seeking to reopen the railway between Tunbridge Wells Central and Eridge and between Uckfield and Lewes as a part of the National Rail network.

Although the SVR reopened the line between Tunbridge Wells West and the national rail network at Eridge in 2011 it has no plans for the reinstatement of the line east to Tunbridge Wells Central.
