= Groombridge railway station =

Station in East Sussex, England

Groombridge
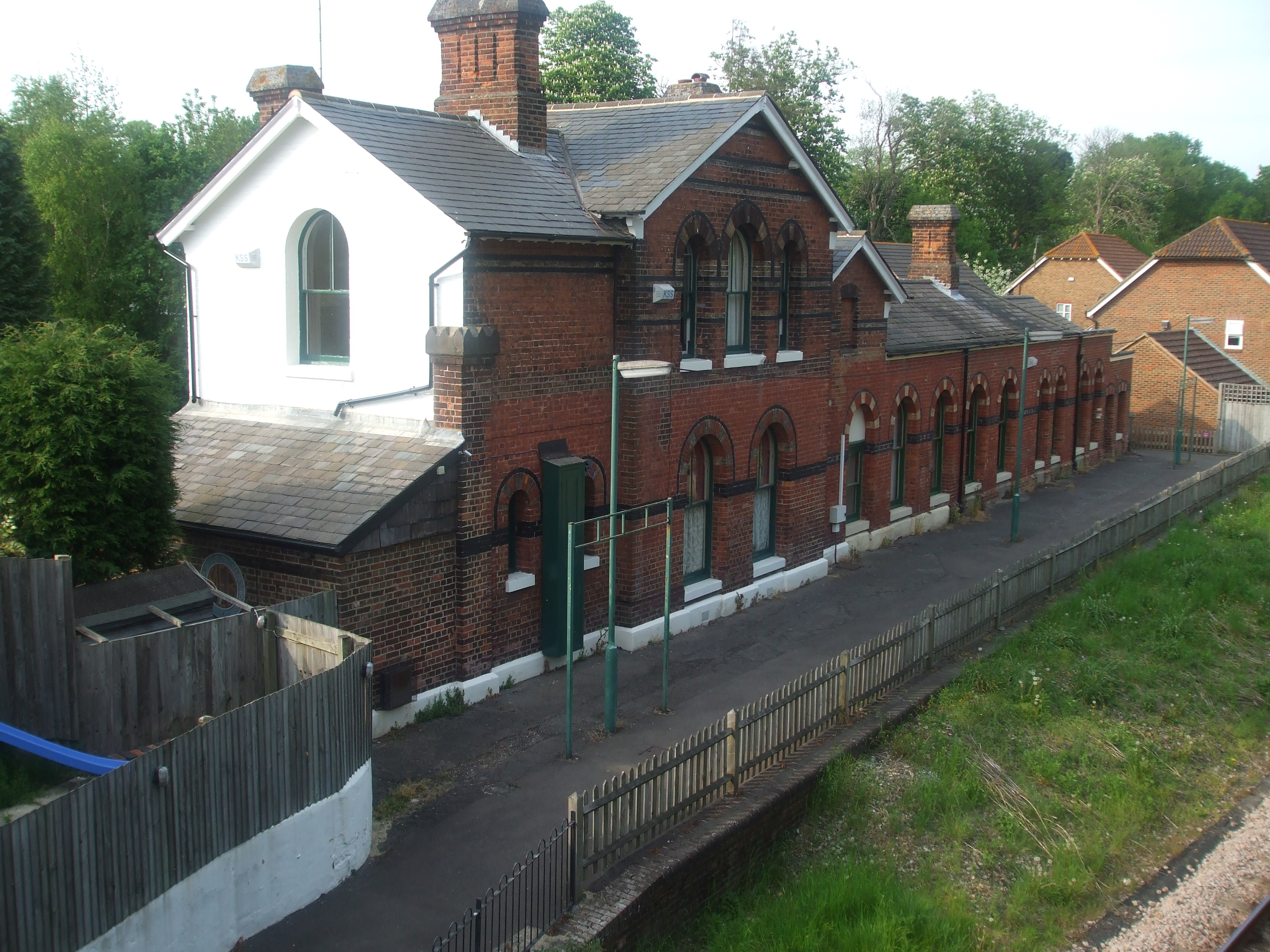
- Groombridge station building, 2008

General information
- Location: Groombridge, Wealden, East Sussex; England
- Coordinates: 51°06′43″N 0°11′16″E
- Grid reference: TQ533372
- System: Station on heritage railway
- Owner: Southern Railway; Southern Region of British Railways; Spa Valley Railway
- Manager: London, Brighton and South Coast Railway
- Platforms: new station 1 (original station 3)

Key dates
- 1 October 1866: Opened
- 4 November 1968: Goods facilities withdrawn
- 8 July 1985: Closed to passengers
- August 1997: Reopened by Spa Valley Railway
Location

Groombridge railway station is a station on the Spa Valley Railway (SVR) in Groombridge, East Sussex, England. Once a busy station serving four directions, it closed in 1985 to British Rail services. A new station the other side of Station Road bridge was opened by the SVR in 1997 as part of a standard gauge heritage railway to Tunbridge Wells West.

== Early years ==
The first Groombridge station was opened in 1866 by the London, Brighton and South Coast Railway (LBSCR) when it extended its Three Bridges to Tunbridge Wells Central Line to Tunbridge Wells.

Two years later, the station's importance increased with the completion of the line from Lewes. At that time, trains from Lewes and Uckfield could only reach East Grinstead by reversing at Groombridge.

In 1878, authority was obtained to lay a single-track spur south of Ashurst Junction, which would enable services to bypass Groombridge. Although completed in 1888, this spur remained largely unused until 1914. It was eventually doubled to handle increased traffic on the Cuckoo Line and regular services to Uckfield.

That reduced the importance of Groombridge as a junction station, because direct Victoria - Crowborough/Uckfield services no longer had to reverse there. The opening of the spur meant that more services were routed through Eridge, which became the point where London trains were divided for the two lines south. To compensate for this loss, slip coaches were shed from some down trains at Ashurst.

Upon the completion of the Cuckoo Line in 1880, which opened up a route to Eastbourne via Polegate, the line between Eridge and Groombridge was doubled. At the same time, a crossover was constructed on the western side of the station, together with associated signalling equipment, and later the Groombridge West signal box. After the opening of the Oxted Line, a second box, "Groombridge Junction", was provided on the opening of the Cuckoo Line, and a third, "Groombridge West" was added in 1888, and the name of the first box was changed to "Groombridge East".

Within 10 years of nationalisation, the three signal boxes had been closed by British Rail and replaced by a single box on 23 November 1958 when the Groombridge section was resignalled.

== Main station building ==
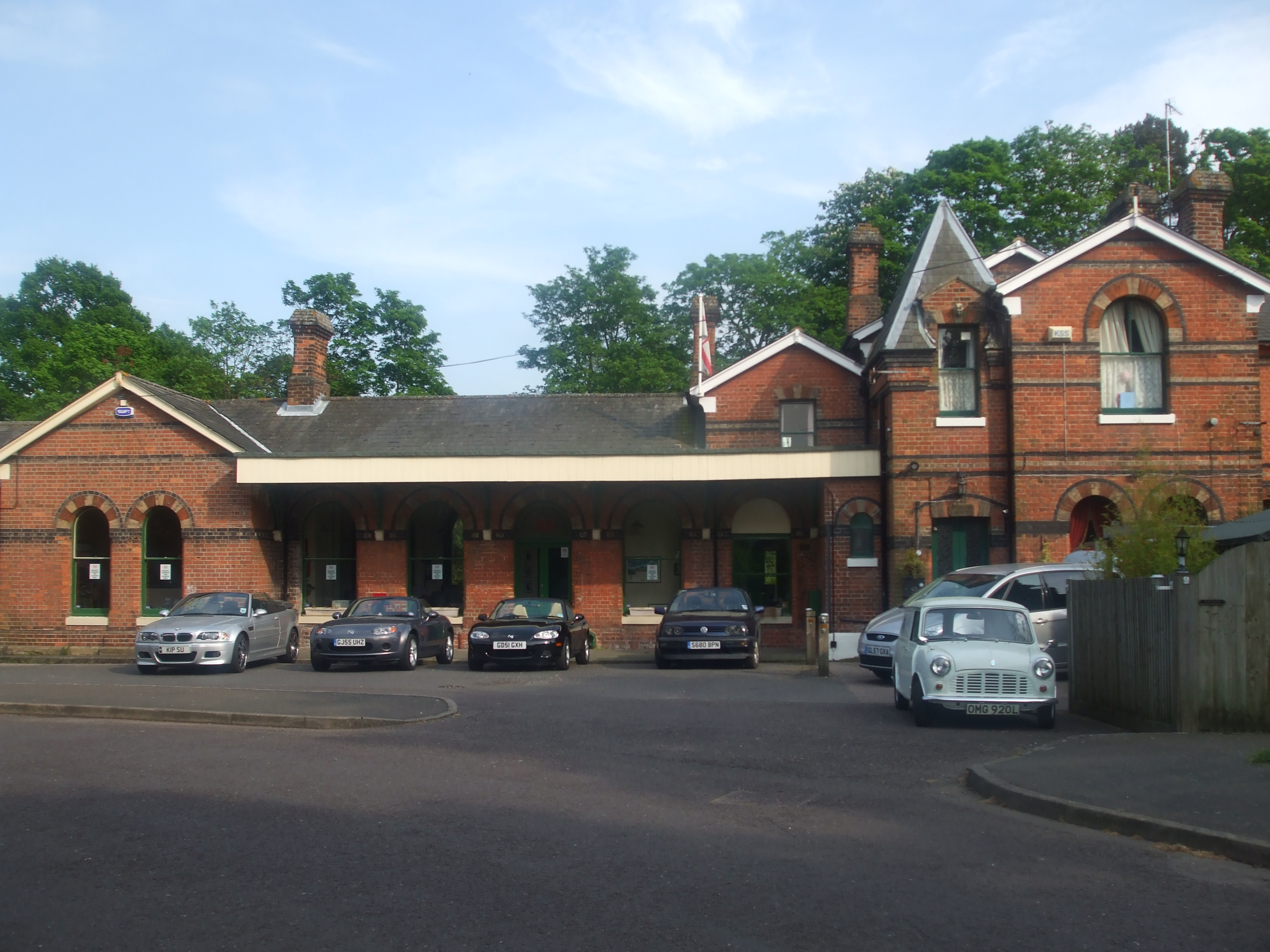
Groombridge Station frontage, 2008

Designed by Charles Henry Driver, the Groombridge station building is located on the east side of Station Road, and is architecturally designed to be "the exact counterpart in miniature of Tunbridge Wells". The building is made of red brick with string courses of blue and white brick, and features coloured brick reveals on the doors and windows. Originally, the stationmaster's residence was on the western side of the building, adjacent to a booking hall. A new goods and parcels office was added to the eastern end of the building, next to the gentlemen's toilets.

The station was equipped with three platform faces, with the main station platform used for down trains, and the far side of the island platform served the up trains. A double track ran through the station, with a third line splaying out to the other side of the island before merging once again with the line to Tunbridge Wells. A subway led from the main platform to the island platform, which previously had no passenger facilities until 1896; upon the urging of a passenger, a waiting room and buffet were added at a cost of £2,300.

Four sets of goods sidings lay to the north of the main station, serving a carriage dock, blacksmith's shop, and stable. The extensive goods yard and generous facilities did not, however, see much use, and the Southern Railway used the station as a collection point for empty wagons and, at one point, as a holding yard for Tunbridge-bound trains.

A footbridge was installed in 1889 to the west of the station, replacing deep cutting steps that led down the embankment on either side of the footpath; the use of those steps was becoming more dangerous with the increasing traffic. By 1899, the levels of traffic generated from the Oxted Line prompted the LBSCR to invest in extending the island platform and re-aligning the track around it.

== Decline ==
Notice announcing the line's closure in 1985

Prior to 1965, north-south train services ran in two sections: Victoria - Tunbridge Wells West, and Tunbridge Wells West - Brighton/Eastbourne; the two sections were interconnected at Groombridge, where Eastbourne and Tunbridge Wells coaches were detached from London trains. The traffic grew from around 80 trains per day in the 1900s to 120 in the 1930s and more than 200 per day in the 1950s. However, the pattern of operations changed significantly in the wake of the Beeching Report, when the relative importance of Groombridge and Eridge as railway junctions diminished with the closure of one after another of the lines in the area. The Cuckoo Line was the first to go in June 1965, followed by the line from Three Bridges and East Grinstead in January 1967, and then the Uckfield line to the south of Uckfield in 1969. The line between Ashurst Junction and Groombridge was taken out on 5 January 1969. At the same time, the 1958 signal box was closed, leaving the block signalling section between Tunbridge Wells West and Birchden Junction.

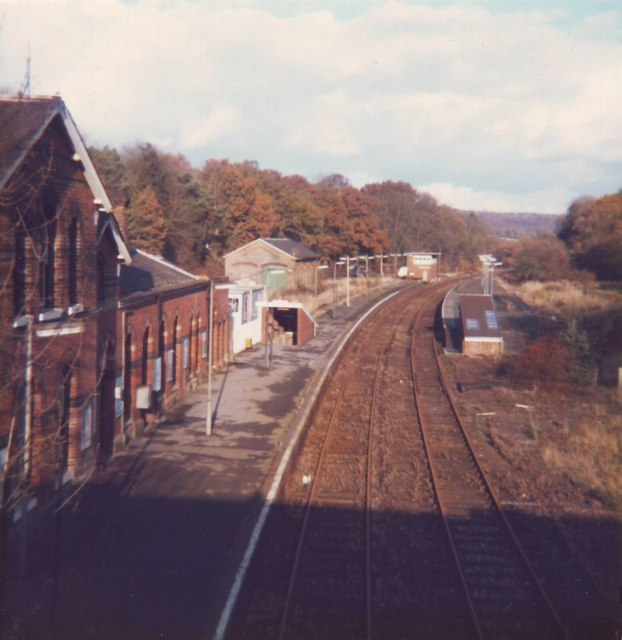
Station shortly after closure, 1986

The section from Birchden Junction to Grove Junction remained open with an hourly off-peak 3-coach DEMU shuttle between Eridge and Tonbridge, with connecting services at Eridge provided for Uckfield line passengers. By the 1980s, the section had been gradually run down with little maintenance and disruptions to service patterns. All of these factors took its toll on passenger numbers, although some commuter traffic remained.

Groombridge station was staffed on the morning shift only by the wife of a railwayman at Tunbridge Wells West, who kept the station clean and tidy. The 1958 signal box remained boarded-up, and the goods yard contained a moribund coal merchant business. In 1985, the Department for Transport gave British Rail permission to close the line from Eridge to Tunbridge Wells with additional alternative bus services being provided. It was announced that the last service would run on 6 July. Empty carriage stock trains continued to pass through the station until the last train on 10 August 1985, after which the line was closed completely.

A private company called "Surrey Downs Ltd" proposed running a joint service with BR from Tonbridge to Uckfield, but that never materialised, amid scepticism from BR that somebody outside the industry could make a loss-making line pay.

== Revival ==
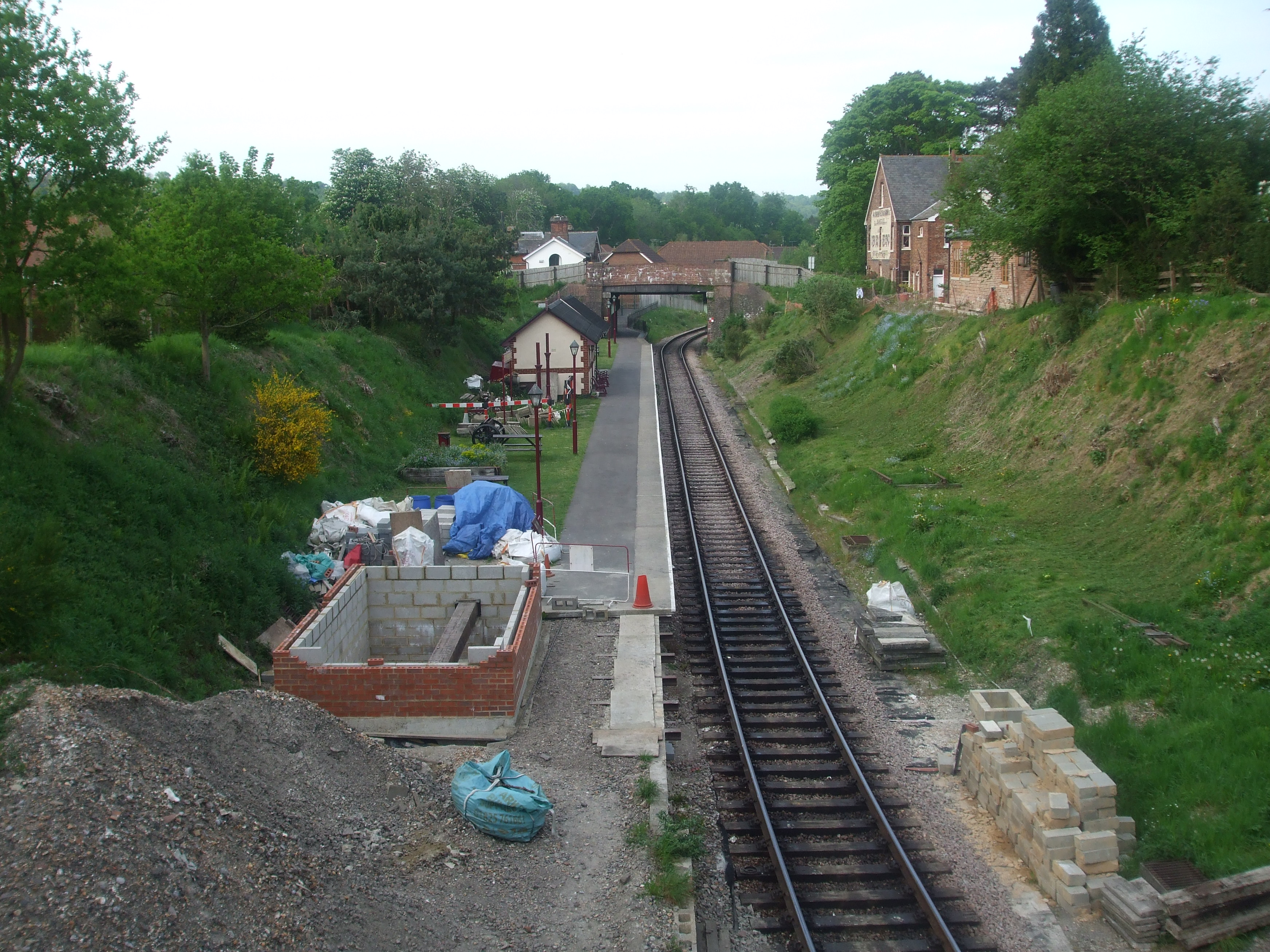
Spa Valley Railway platform, looking towards High Rocks, 2008

In March 1996, the Spa Valley Railway obtained the trackbed between Tunbridge Wells West and Birchden Junction. The first public services started in December 1996, running for under 1 mile (1,600 m) from Tunbridge Wells West. After much hard work, the public service from Tunbridge Wells West to Groombridge was reinstated in August 1997.

Becauae the original Groombridge station building had been turned into a private residence, and the old ticket offices served as offices for a local financial adviser, a new station had to be constructed on the opposite side of the road bridge. Access to the new station was provided via the old main station platform, which was extended. The new single track had to be laid to curve along the trackbed of the old up-loop line into the new station, due to houses having been built on part of the former trackbed.

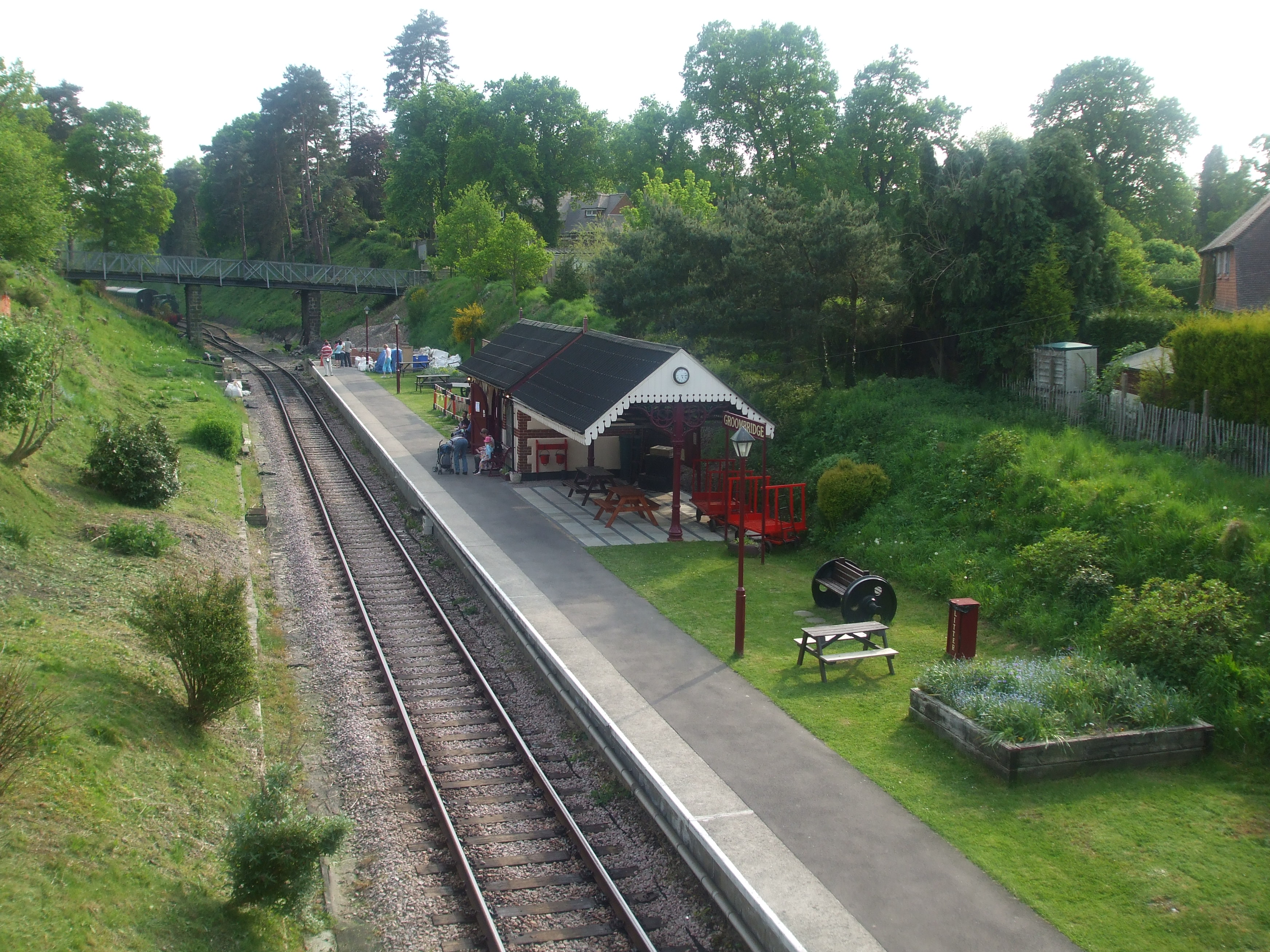
Spa Valley Railway platform, 2008

Canopies have been erected on the station, using the former canopy supports from Gravesend West station. The signal box has been updated from the current picture, and an LBSCR signal frame, originally from the Birchden Junction signal box, has been installed. It was first operated on 1 August 2014. A refreshment kiosk has also been constructed, selling local produce, hot and cold drinks, and ice creams. The section of line between Groombridge to Eridge reopened on 25 March 2011.

Preceding station	Heritage railways	Following station
Eridge Terminus	Spa Valley Railway	High Rocks towards Tunbridge Wells West
Disused railways
Eridge	British Rail; Southern Region; Wealden Line	High Rocks Halt
Eridge	British Rail; Southern Region; Cuckoo Line	High Rocks Halt
Withyham	British Rail; Southern Region; Three Bridges to Tunbridge Wells Central Line	High Rocks Halt
Ashurst	British Rail; Southern Region; Oxted Line	High Rocks Halt
