= Spa Valley Railway =

Heritage railway in southeast England

Coordinates: 51.12384°N 0.23706°E

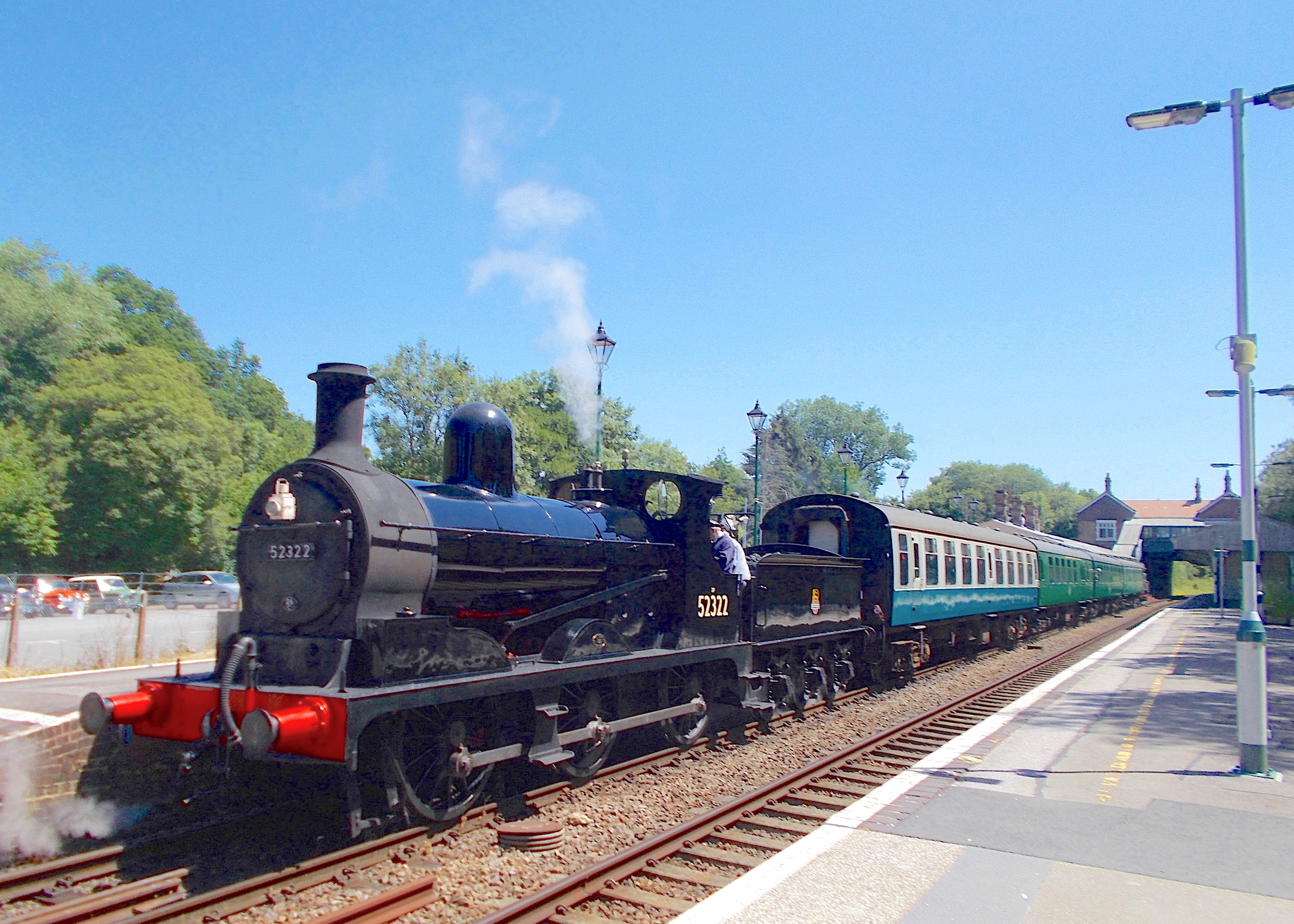
- British Railways 0-6-0 Class A No. 52322 at Eridge

Commercial operations
- Original gauge: 4 ft 8 1/2 in (1,435 mm) standard gauge

Preserved operations
- Stations: 4
- Length: 5.5 mi (8.9 km)
- Preserved gauge: 4 ft 8 1/2 in (1,435 mm) standard gauge

Commercial history
- Closed: 1985

Preservation history
- December 1996: Re-open first 0.8 mi (1.3 km) from Tunbridge Wells West to near High Rocks
- August 1997: Open to Groombridge
- 2005: line to Birchden Jn open for special services
- 25 March 2011: Open to Eridge
- Headquarters: Tunbridge Wells West railway station

The Spa Valley Railway is a standard gauge heritage railway in the United Kingdom that runs from Tunbridge Wells West railway station in Royal Tunbridge Wells to High Rocks, Groombridge, and Eridge, where it links with the Oxted Line.

It crosses the Kent and East Sussex border, covering a distance of 5 miles (8 km), along the former Wealden Line between Tunbridge Wells Central and Lewes. The railway headquarters is also at Tunbridge Wells West railway station.

== History ==
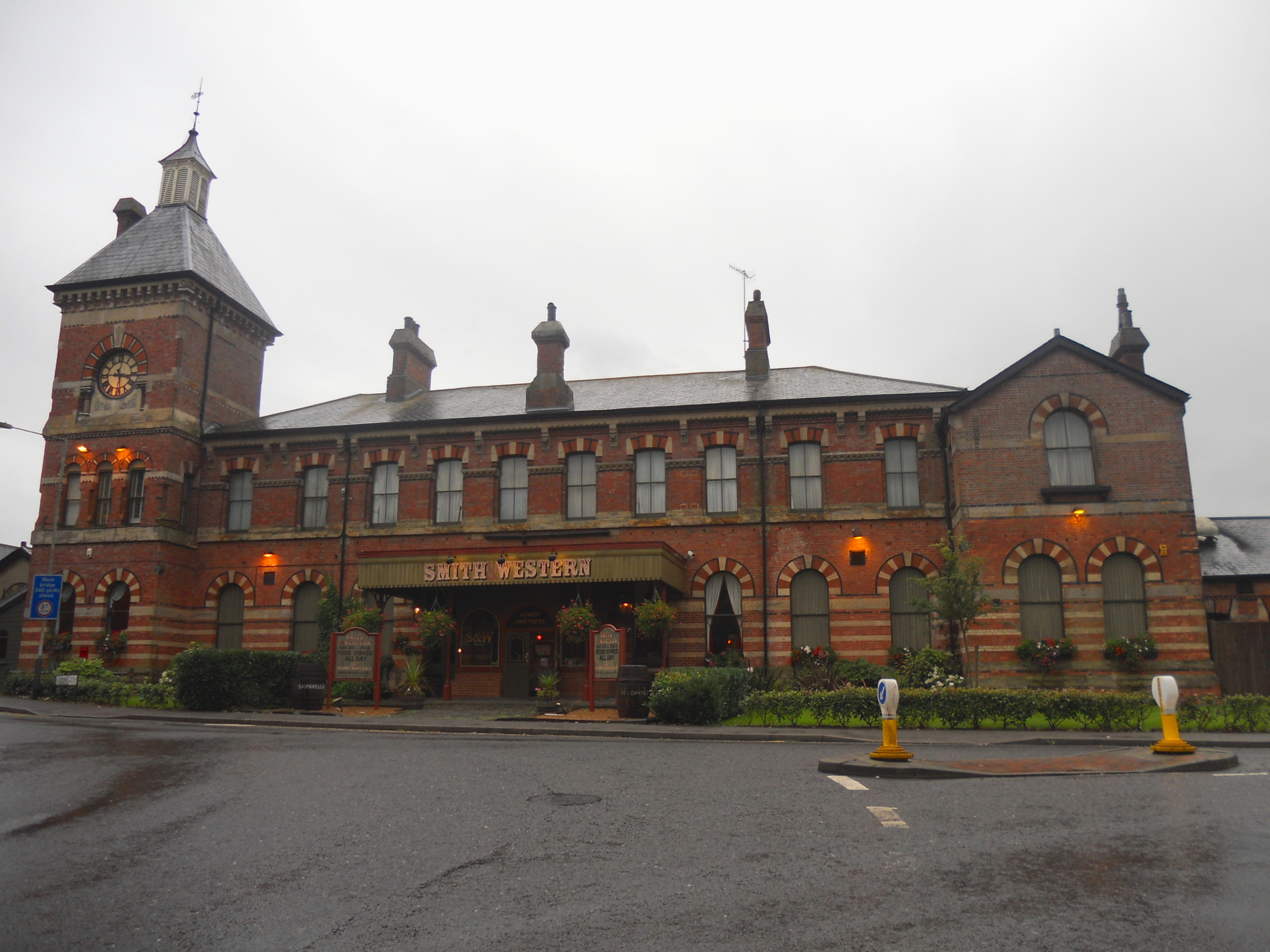
The original Tunbridge Wells West station building

The East Grinstead, Groombridge and Tunbridge Wells Railway railway was engineered by the London, Brighton and South Coast Railway (LB&SCR) Chief Engineer Frederick Banister opened in 1866. This being an extension to the Three Bridges–East Grinstead line which had been completed in 1855. The line between Uckfield and Groombridge Junction opened in 1868.

The EGGTWR was part of a regional race between the LB&SCR and the SER, and a specific race to access the town of Royal Tunbridge Wells:

From Tunbridge Wells West railway station there were direct services to the South Coast at Brighton and to London Victoria. With the opening of the Cuckoo Line in 1880 direct services ran to Eastbourne. Completion of the line between Hurst Green and Ashurst Jn in 1888 enabled a sign to be displayed outside the station proudly proclaimed, "New Route to London: Shortest, Quickest and Most Direct. Frequent Express Trains".

=== Closure ===
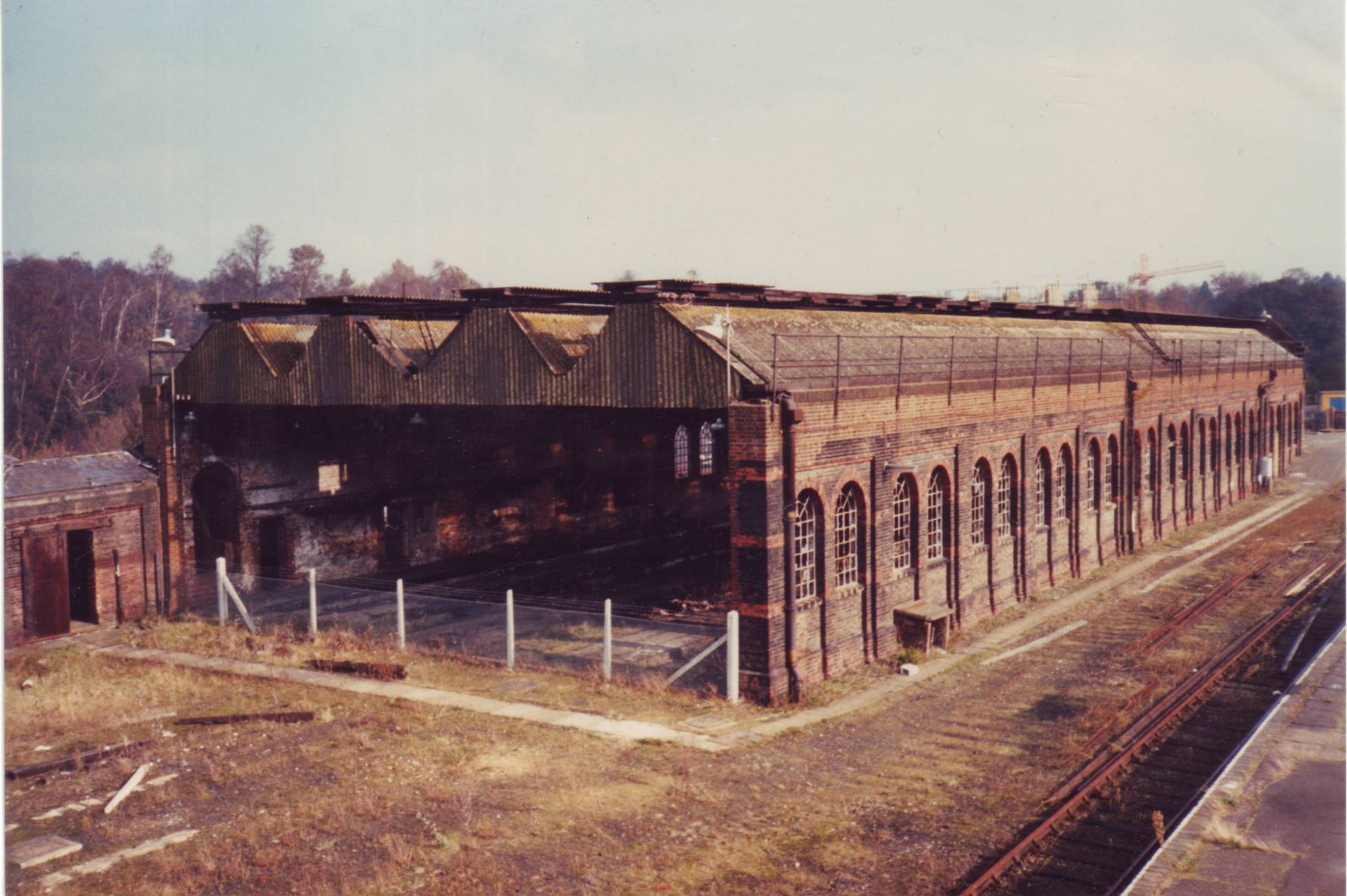
Derelict locomotive shed, c. 1986

As the popularity of the motor car increased, train services were severely cut back due to the lack of patronage, and the number of services passing through Tunbridge Wells West railway station declined as one line after another was closed from the 1950s onwards. First, the East Grinstead to Lewes line closed in 1958, then the Cuckoo Line in 1965, the Three Bridges to Groombridge in 1967, and finally the Wealden Line south of Uckfield in 1969. The line between Tunbridge Wells and Eridge was itself listed for closure in 1966, only to be subsequently reprieved. The line remained open, although in its latter years passenger services were mainly confined to a shuttle service between Tonbridge (via the single line connection to Tunbridge Wells Central – now plain Tunbridge Wells) and Eridge with a few through trains to Uckfield. However, there was a depot at Tunbridge Wells West which housed rolling stock for services on the Uckfield– and East Grinstead–London (via East Croydon) lines, and there were several empty stock moves early and late in the day.

By the early 1980s, the track and signalling needed to be replaced and British Rail were planning an upgrade of the Tonbridge to Hastings Line. British Rail therefore, announced the proposed closure of the line (including Groombridge and Tunbridge Wells West stations) from 16 May 1983 which was later deferred after public objections. It was announced in February 1985 that the Secretary of State for Transport agreed to the withdrawal of passenger services deciding that the cost of keeping the line open from Birchden Jn to Grove Jn and undertaking renewing Grove Junction did not justify the outlay. The passenger service was withdrawn from 8 July 1985 although the section between Tunbridge Wells West and Birchden Jn remained open for rolling stock movements until 10 August, when the depot at Tunbridge Wells West station was shut. At the time of closure, Tunbridge Wells West station had gas lighting, which was in operation in the ticket office and under the canopy.

== Preservation ==
=== Restoration ===
The SVR has its origins in a charitable society formed on 13 September 1985, to purchase and reopen the Tunbridge Wells West to Eridge line. Named the Tunbridge Wells and Eridge Railway Preservation Society (TWERPS), it began a long struggle to reopen the line. The campaign received a setback in the late 1980s when Tunbridge Wells Borough Council gave planning permission for the construction of a large Sainsbury's supermarket complex on the site of the derelict station site of Tunbridge Wells West. While the 1891 locomotive shed and station building were protected as listed buildings, the remaining area of the site was obliterated, including the goods shed and signal boxes. However, planning permission was subject to the condition that the developer pay for construction of a new station platform and restoration of the engine shed.

The North Downs Steam Railway relocated from Dartford in 1996, where it was experiencing vandalism problems, and merged with TWERPS. It transferred its assets and helped establish a base in the former LB&SCR locomotive shed. The group had also acquired the line as far as Birchden Junction during that year. Alongside the loco shed, a new platform was built, from where services began running to Cold Bath Bridge (about 0.8 miles (1.3 km) away) in December 1996. Services were extended to Groombridge in August 1997 and to Birchden Junction in 2005.

In 2007, SVR marked the 10th anniversary of the opening of the line by transforming Groombridge into a busy interchange station, with trains arriving or departing every 15 minutes. The funds raised from this event went towards the "Return to Eridge" appeal to raise £500,000 for the extension to the Uckfield main line at Eridge. On 25 March 2011 the SVR extended passenger services to Eridge, where there is a footbridge interchange with Southern services on the London Bridge to Uckfield line.

In August 2017, a special event (20th Birthday Bash) was held to celebrate 20 years since the reopening of the line to Groombridge, starring a variety of home and visiting locomotives, including BR Standard 4 Tank 80078.

== Rolling stock ==
=== Steam ===
==== Operational ====
| Identity | Former operator | Class | Builder | Works Number | Built | Wheel Arrangement | Notes | Image |
|---|---|---|---|---|---|---|---|---|
| 34053 Sir Keith Park | BR | Battle of Britain | Brighton Works | | 1947 | 4-6-2 | The locomotive arrived in September 2020 and is now permanently based at the Spa Valley Railway following an agreement between the line and its owners. Returned to the railway in July 2024 following completion of overhaul. | |
| 80078 | BR | Standard Class 4MT | Brighton works | | 1954 | 2-6-4T | Regular visitor, based at the Mid-Norfolk Railway. Owned by Stewart Robinson. | |
| 828 | Caledonian Railway | 812 Class | St Rollox | | 1899 | 0-6-0 | On long term hire since 2022. | |

==== Non-operational ====
| Identity | Former operator | Class | Builder | Works Number | Built | Wheel Arrangement | Notes | Image |
|---|---|---|---|---|---|---|---|---|
| 50; Sutton | LB&SCR | A1X 'Terrier' | Brighton Works | | 1876 | 0-6-0T | Undergoing overhaul since 2011. | |
| 2193; Topham | W. G. Bagnall | | Bagnall Works, Stafford | | 1922 | 0-6-0ST | Stored awaiting overhaul. | |
| 47493 | LMS | 3F 'Jinty' | Vulcan Foundry | 4195 | 1927 | 0-6-0T | Undergoing overhaul since 2014. Originally numbered 16576, later 7493. Expected to return to steam by 2026. | |
| 68077 | LNER | J94 | Andrew Barclay | 2215 | 1947 | 0-6-0ST | Stored. | |
| No.57; Samson | Stewarts & Lloyds Ltd, Corby | 'Ugly' | RSH | 7668 | 1950 | 0-6-0ST | Stored. | |
| No. 62; Ugly | Stewarts & Lloyds Ltd, Corby | 'Ugly' | RSH | 7673 | 1950 | 0-6-0ST | On display since 2021 awaiting overhaul. | |

=== Diesel ===
==== Operational ====
| Identity | Class | Builder | Built | Livery | Notes | Image |
|---|---|---|---|---|---|---|
| 08922 | Class 08 | | 1962 | BR Railfreight Grey | The locomotive arrived in September 2023 on hire from the Great Central Railway (Nottingham). | |
| 09004 / D3668 | British Rail Class 09 | British Rail Darlington Works | 1959 | BR Blue | On hire from Valley Rail Preservation. | |
| 25185 / D7535 | British Rail Class 25 | British Rail Derby Works | 1965 | BR Blue | On hire from South Devon Diesel Traction. | |
| 31430 Sister Dora | British Rail Class 31 | Brush Traction | 1961 | BR Blue | Owned by Martin Staniforth. | |
| 33063 R. J. Mitchell | Class 33/0 | BRCW | January 1962 | Railfreight Triple Grey | Owned by the South East Locomotive Group. Undergoing repaint. | |
| 2591 Southerham | | Drewry | | Unlined Black | | |
| 189C | Vanguard | Thomas Hill | | Blue | | |

==== Non-operational ====
| Identity | Class | Builder | Built | Livery | Notes | Image |
|---|---|---|---|---|---|---|
| 09026 Cedric Wares | Class 09 | | 1962 | BR Green | Currently undergoing overhaul. Was previously named William Pearson during its career at Brighton Lovers Walk TMD. | |
| 15224 | Class 12 | Ashford Works | 1949 | BR Green | Stored. | |
| 33065 Sealion | Class 33/0 | BRCW | January 1962 | BR Blue | Owned by the South East Locomotive Group. Undergoing overhaul. | |

=== Multiple Units ===
DMU s are diesel multiple units. EMUs are electric multiple units but these are only being used as static or hauled stock on this line.

| Type | Identity | Origin | Class | Code | Notes | Photograph |
|---|---|---|---|---|---|---|
| EMU | 12275 | BR | 6-PAN | TFK | Underframe only, converted to crane wagon. | |
| DEMU | 1317 | BR | Class 207 | 3D (currently operating as 2D) | In service. Formed of DMBSO 60142, TC 60616, DTSO 60909/60916. TC 60616, the unique centre car, is currently being internally restored. | |
| DEMU | No. 1302 | BR | Class 207 | N/A | Built in 1962. In service until destroyed in a fire on 20 May 2016. Arrived from Swindon and Cricklade Railway in February 2024. | |

=== Carriages ===
All passenger stock on the railway consists of either BR Mark 1 or Mark 2 stock.

| Origin | Number | Type | Notes | Photograph |
|---|---|---|---|---|
| Mark 1 | 1864 | Restaurant Miniature Buffet (RMB) | In service - BR (W) Chocolate and Cream. | |
| Mark 1 | 21214 | Brake Composite Corridor (BCK) | In service - BR (S) Green | |
| Mark 1 | 25843 | Second Open Buffet (SOB) | In service as Kate - BR (S) Green | |
| Mark 1 | 25845 | Second Corridor (SK) | Stored awaiting overhaul - BR (E) Maroon | |
| Mark 1 | 3131 | First Open (FO) | Under overhaul - BR (S) Crimson and Cream | |
| Mark 1 | 35289 | Brake Second Corridor (BSK) | Under overhaul - being converted to a kitchen car. Formerly in departmental use as BDC 977168 with Balfour Beatty. | |
| Mark 1 | 4828 | Second Open (SO) | In service - BR (S) Green | |
| Mark 1 | 4946 | Tourist Second Open (TSO) | In service - BR (W) Chocolate and Cream. | |
| Mark 1 | 4949 | Tourist Second Open (TSO) | In service - BR (W) Chocolate and Cream. | |
| Mark 1 | 4999 | Tourist Second Open (TSO) | In service - BR (S) Green / BR Blue and Grey on alternate sides. | |
| Mark 1 | 5037 | Tourist Second Open (TSO) (with Easy Access modifications) | In service - BR (S) Green | |
| Mark 1 | 92111 | Brake Gangway (BG) | Stored | |
| Mark 2 | 9414 | Brake Second Open (BSO) | In service - BR (S) Green | |
