= Eridge railway station =

Railway Station in East Sussex, England

Coordinates: 51.089°N 0.201°E

Eridge
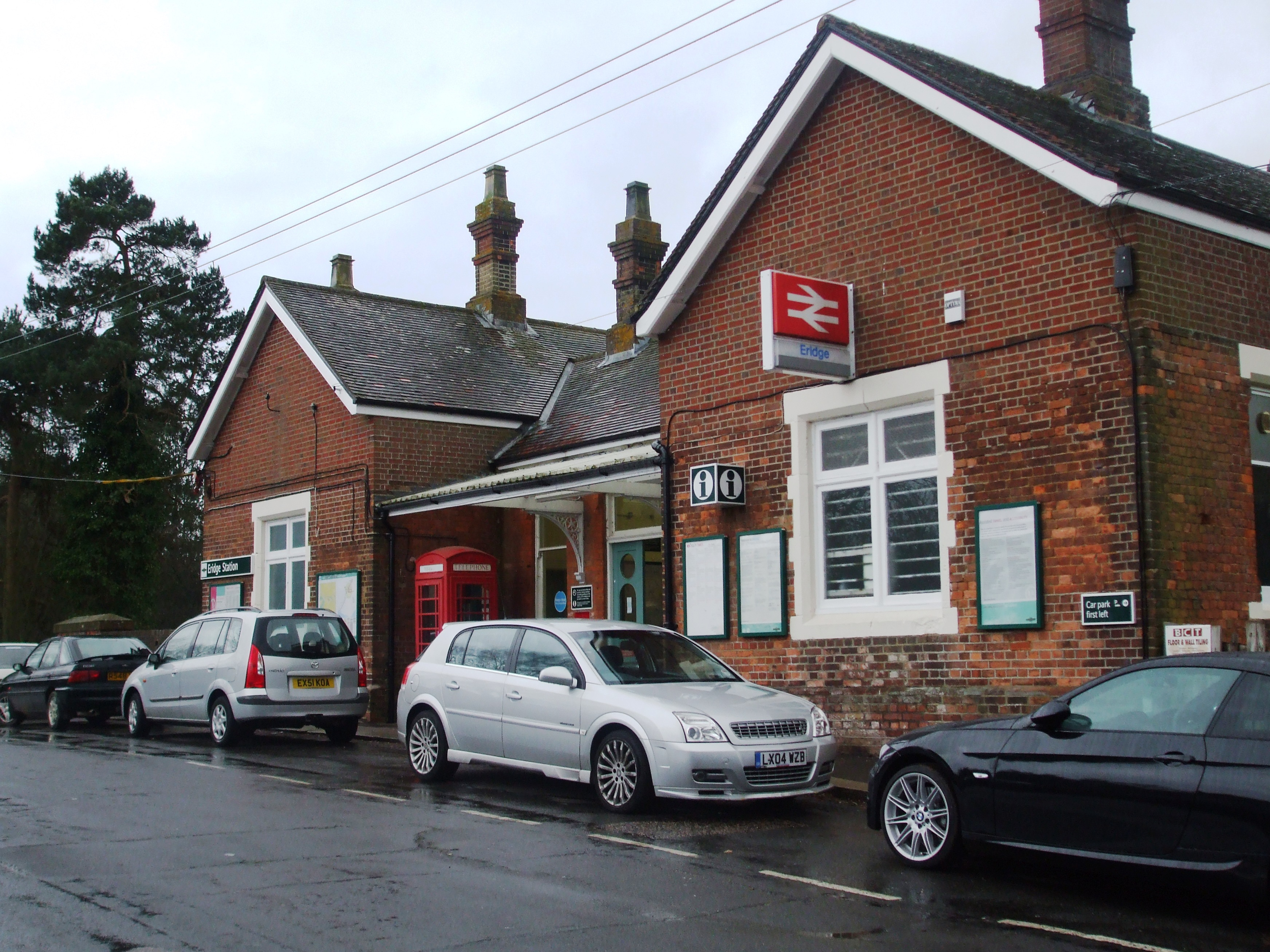

General information
- Location: Eridge, Wealden; England
- Grid reference: TQ542345
- Managed by: Southern
- Platforms: 3

Other information
- Station code: ERI
- Classification: DfT category E

History
- Opened: 3 August 1868
- Original company: Brighton, Uckfield and Tunbridge Wells Railway
- Pre-grouping: London, Brighton and South Coast Railway
- Post-grouping: Southern Railway; Southern Region of British Railways; Network SouthEast

Passengers
- 2020/21: ▼15,882
- 2021/22: ▲50,554
- 2022/23: ▲70,820
- 2023/24: ▲73,124
- 2024/25: ▲82,636
Location
Notes
- Passenger statistics from the Office of Rail and Road

Eridge railway station is on the Uckfield branch of the Oxted line in southern England and serves a rural district around Eridge in East Sussex. It is 35 miles 53 chains (35.66 miles, 57.39 km) from London Bridge. The station is managed by Southern.

Train services from the station are provided by Southern. Also, heritage services connecting to Groombridge, High Rocks and Tunbridge Wells West are run by the Spa Valley Railway. The station has a small car park and there is a pub next to the station called the Huntsman.

== Services ==
National Rail services at Eridge are operated by Southern using Class 171 DMUs.

The typical off-peak service in trains per hour is:

- 1 tph to London Bridge via Oxted
- 1 tph to Uckfield

Services increase to 2 tph in each direction during the peak hours.

On Sundays, the northbound service runs as far as Oxted only.

Spa Valley Railway services operate between Eridge and Tunbridge Wells West on selected days to connect to Oxted Line services.

Preceding station	National Rail	Following station
Ashurst	Southern Oxted Line Uckfield Branch	Crowborough
Preceding station	Heritage railways	Following station
Groombridge towards Tunbridge Wells West	Spa Valley Railway	Terminus
Disused railways
Groombridge	British Rail Southern Region Cuckoo Line	Rotherfield and Mark Cross

== History ==
The station was opened by the Brighton, Uckfield and Tunbridge Wells Railway on 3 August 1868.

At the time the station was opened, the village of Eridge Green was owned by the nearby Eridge Park, seat of the Earls of Abergavenny.

The station used to be a junction for services running towards Tonbridge via Tunbridge Wells West (closed 1985) and Cuckoo Line to Eastbourne (via Heathfield and Hailsham) closed 1965.

When the Uckfield line was singled in January 1990 all trains used the former up line and only the former up island platform was used by British Rail. The former down island platform was then abandoned but was restored by the Spa Valley Railway, a preserved railway company, who reopened the railway between Eridge and Tunbridge Wells West on 25 March 2011, with trains using the former down line for about 1 mile (1.6 km) north to Birchden Junction where the parallel single lines diverge.

In June 2021, work began to provide step-free access to both the National Rail platform and the Spa Valley Railway platforms at the station. The work was formally completed on 16 February 2022.

The Wealden Line Campaign are attempting to re-open the railway between Uckfield and Lewes and Eridge to Tunbridge Wells lines as a part of the National Rail network.
