= High Rocks railway station =

Former railway station in England

High Rocks
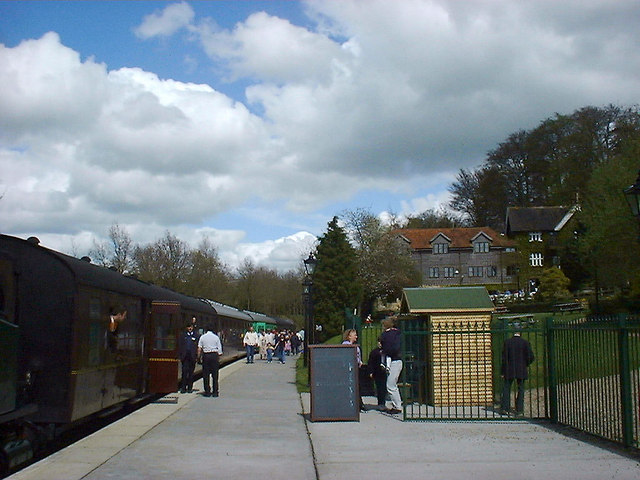

General information
- Location: High Rocks, Wealden, East Sussex; England
- Coordinates: 51.12278°N 0.22632°E
- Grid reference: TQ559383
- System: Station on heritage railway
- Owner: Southern Railway; Southern Region of British Railways; High Rocks Inn
- Manager: London, Brighton and South Coast Railway; Spa Valley Railway
- Platforms: 1 (original halt had 2)

Key dates
- 1 June 1907: Station opened
- 16 October 1939: Station closed
- 15 June 1942: Station reopened
- 5 May 1952: Station closed
- 10 August 1985: Line closed
- August 1997: Line reopened between Tunbridge Wells West and Groombridge
- August 1998: New station on different site opened by Spa Valley Railway
Location

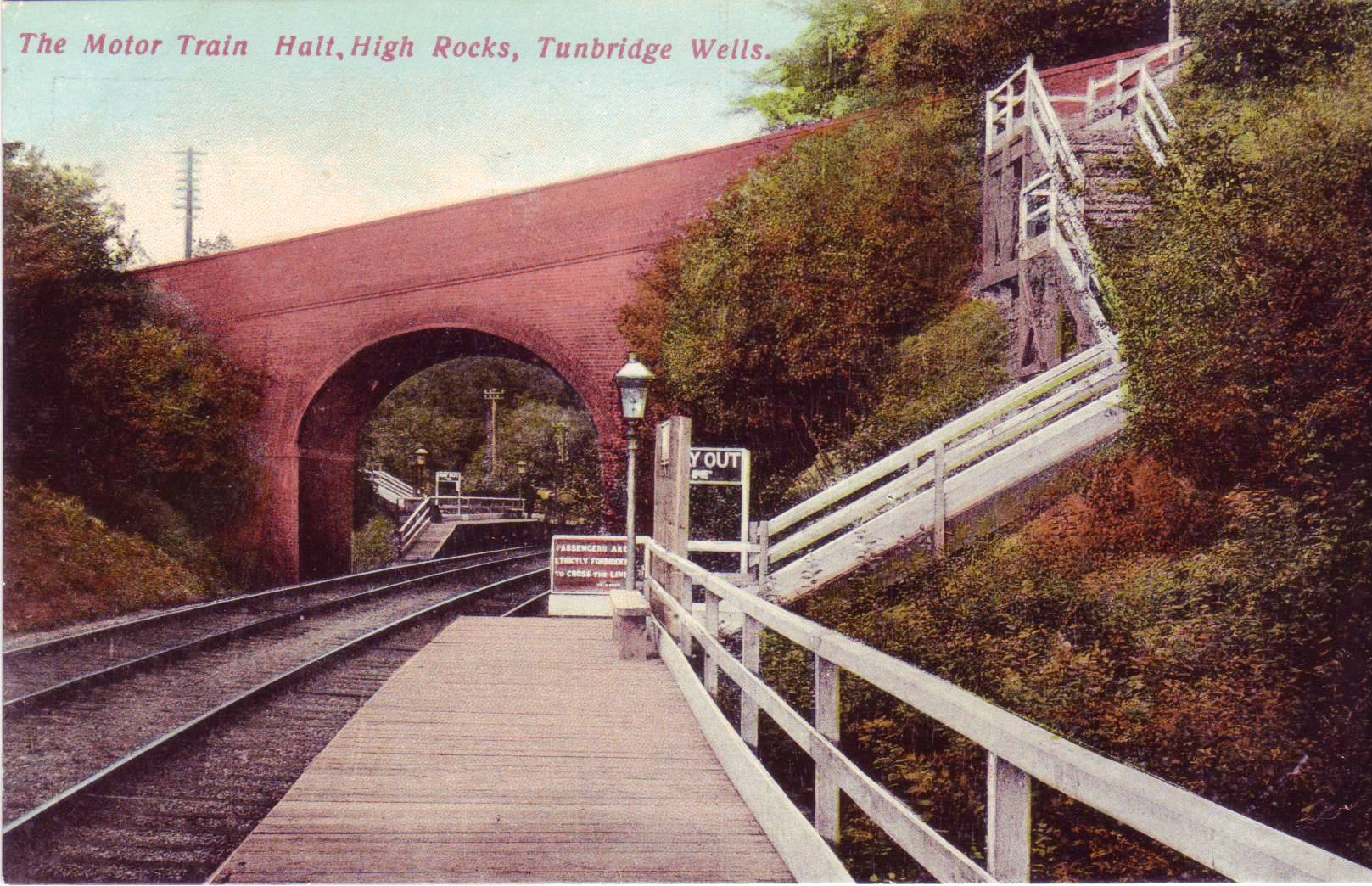
The original High Rocks halt

High Rocks railway station is a station on the Spa Valley Railway in High Rocks, East Sussex, England.

== History ==
The original High Rocks Halt opened on 1 June 1907, as part of a London, Brighton and South Coast Railway scheme to boost traffic on its lines. It finally closed on 5 May 1952 due to low traffic (it had been closed from 16 October 1939 to 15 June 1942 as a wartime economy measure). The rest of the line soldiered on with ever-decreasing services, to be finally closed to all traffic on 10 August 1985.

== Preservation ==
The line through the station site was re-opened by the Spa Valley Railway in 1997. The new High Rocks station opened in August 1998, having been built about 100 yards west of the original halt closed in 1952. The platform was built by the High Rocks Inn, through whose gardens access to the platform is provided. As a result, the station is only served by trains when the Inn is open to the public.

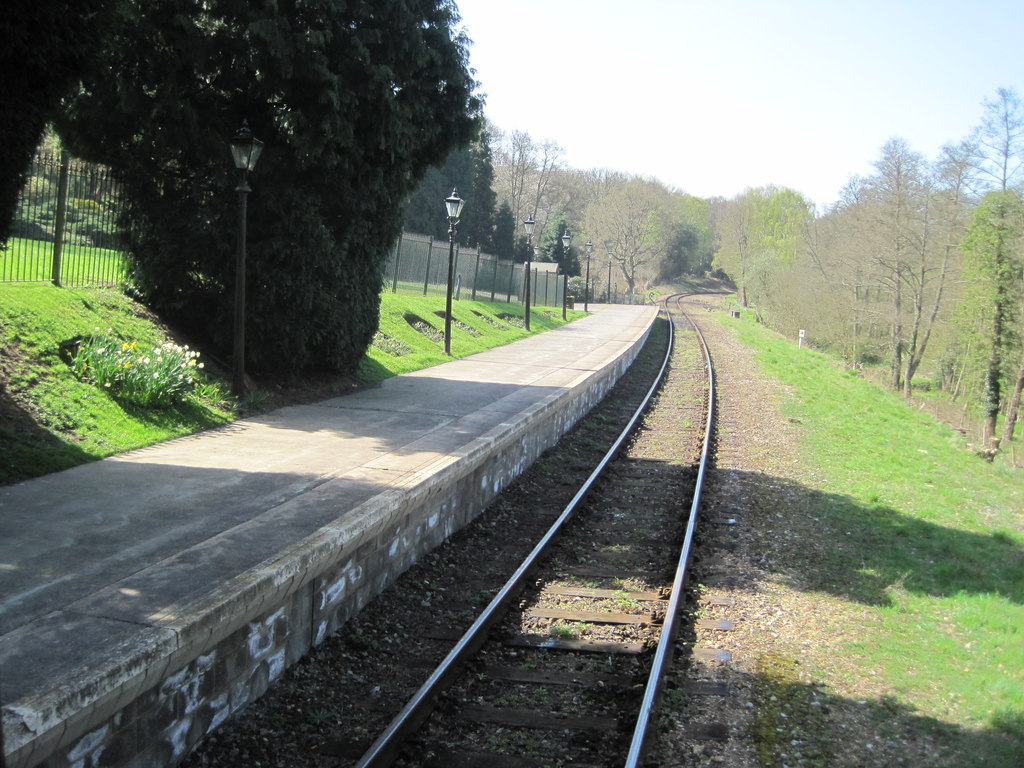
The platform seen from an approaching train.

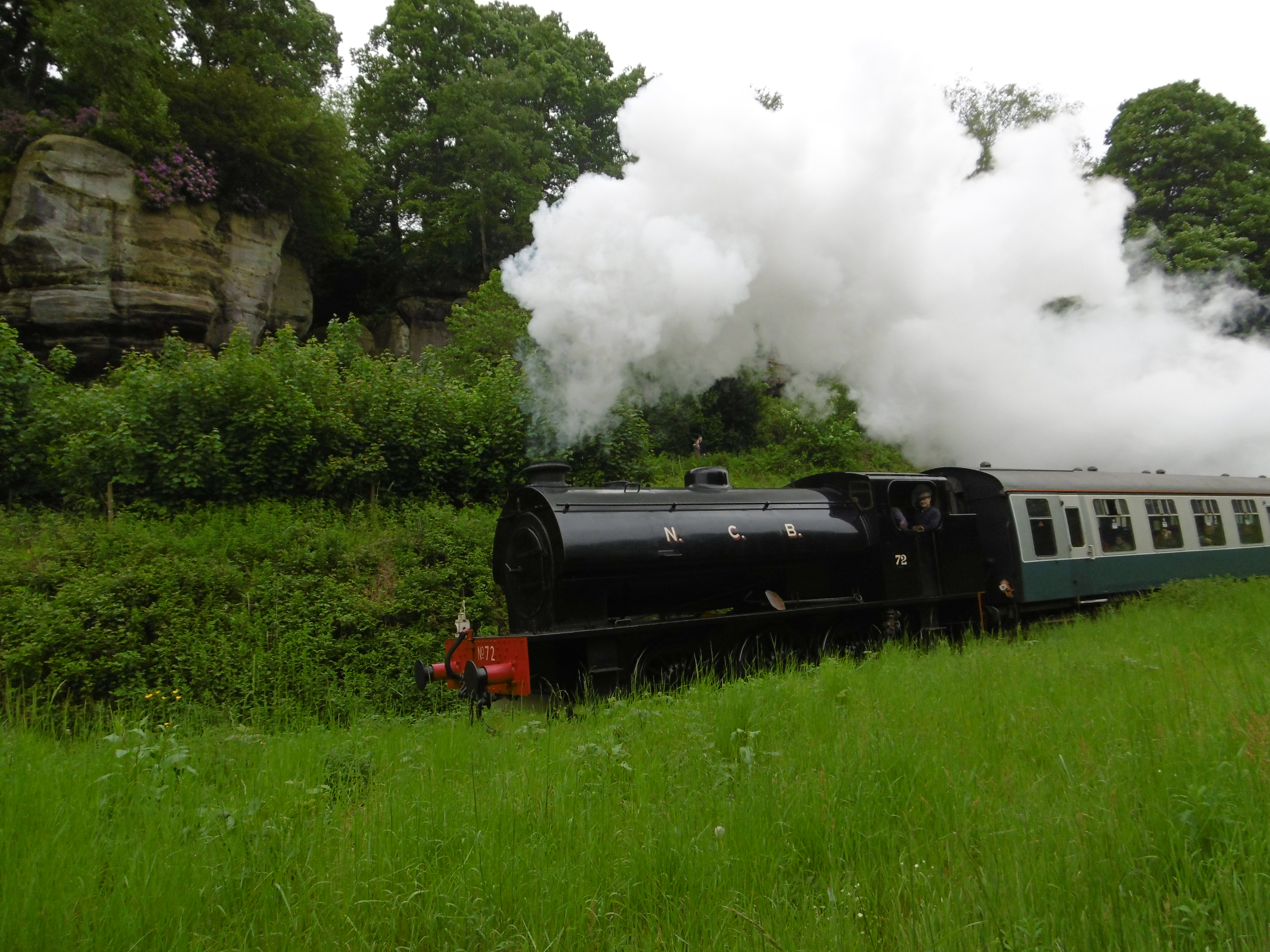
Hunslet Austerity 0-6-0ST no.72 passes the site of the original halt.

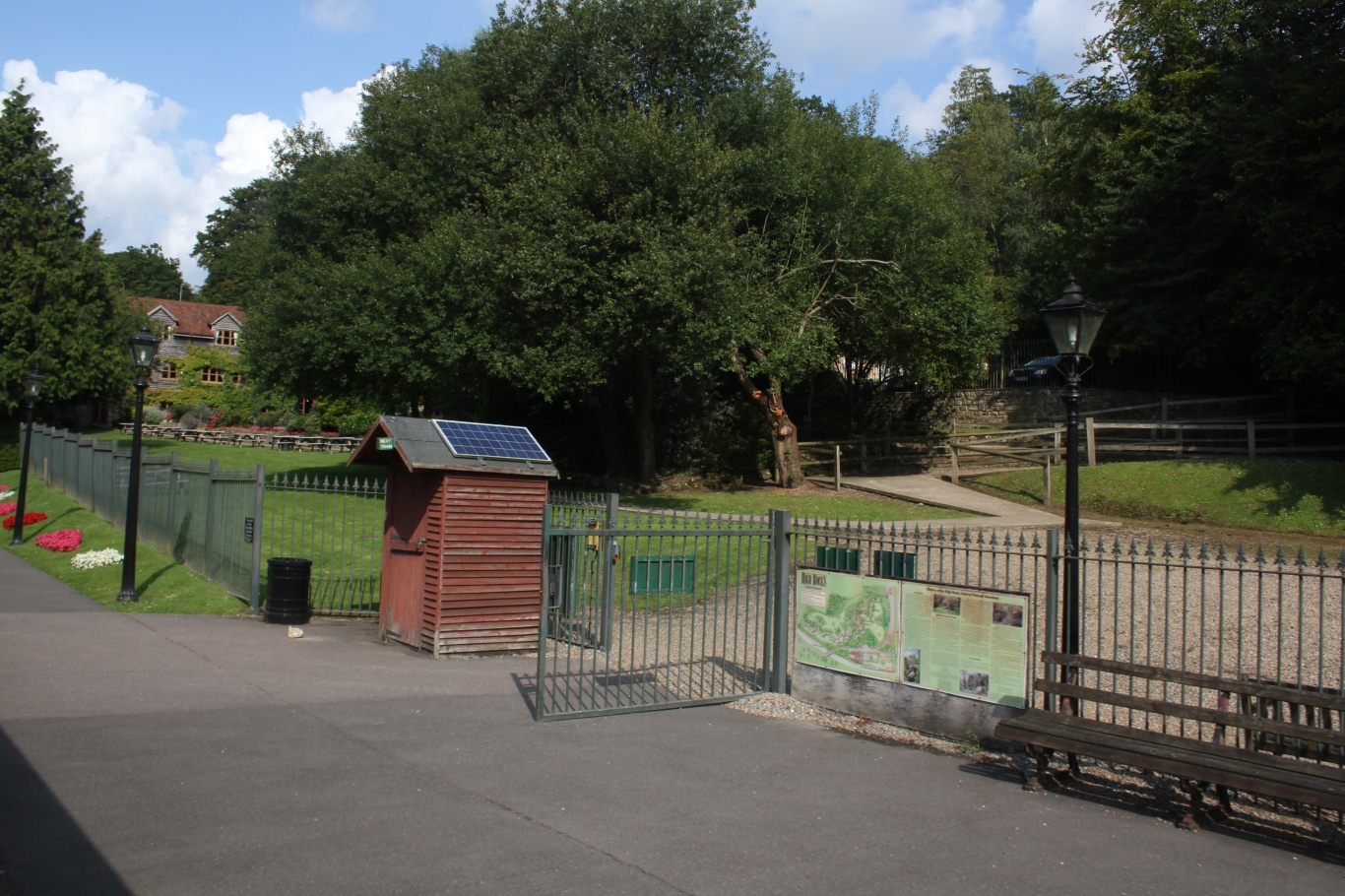
The platform gate into the High Rocks gardens through which passengers leave the station.

Preceding station	Heritage railways	Following station
Groombridge towards Eridge	Spa Valley Railway	Tunbridge Wells West Terminus
Disused railways
Groombridge	British Rail; Southern Region; Wealden Line	Tunbridge Wells West
Groombridge	British Rail; Southern Region; Cuckoo Line	Tunbridge Wells West
Groombridge	British Rail; Southern Region; Three Bridges to Tunbridge Wells Central Line	Tunbridge Wells West
