= Thameslink (disambiguation) =

Thameslink is a major British railway route running in South East England

Related to the above railway route, Thameslink may also refer to:

== Stations ==
- City Thameslink, station on the route, opened in 1990
- Kings Cross Thameslink, former station on the route, open between 1983 and 2007

== Companies ==
- Thameslink (train operating company, 1997–2006), a former train operating company
- Govia Thameslink Railway, train operating company that has operated services under the Thameslink brand between 2014 and 2026
- Greater Thameslink Railway, train operating company that has operated services under the Thameslink brand since 2026

== See also ==
- Thameslink, Southern and Great Northern franchise, which includes the Thameslink route
- Thameslink Programme, a major railway project to upgrade the route
