= British Rail Class 488 =

Unpowered trailer sets

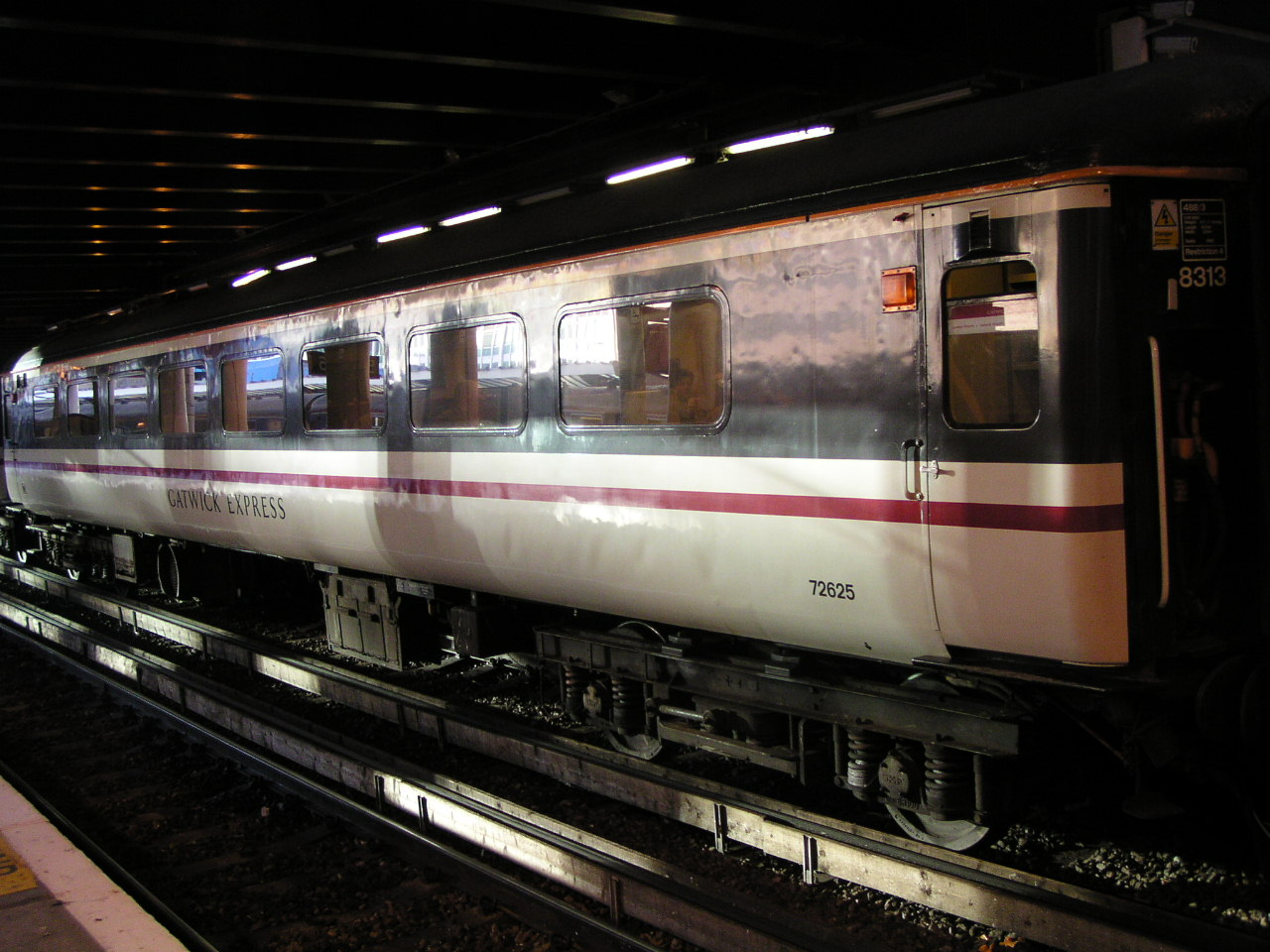
- A Class 488 coach at London Victoria in 2003
- In service: 1973–present
- Manufacturers: BREL, Derby Litchurch Lane Works
- Formation: 2-car (Class 488/2), 3-car (Class 488/3)
- Operators: Network Rail; Ministry of Defence

Specifications
- Car length: 66 ft 1/2 in (20.13 m)
- Width: 9 ft 3 in (2.82 m)
- Height: 12 ft 9 1/4 in (3.89 m)
- Maximum speed: 90 mph (140 km/h)
- Weight: 105 t (103 long tons; 116 short tons)
- Bogies: B5
- Track gauge: 4 ft 8 1/2 in (1,435 mm) standard gauge

The British Rail Class 488 are unpowered trailer sets, converted from Mark 2F coaches for the Gatwick Express service from London Victoria to Gatwick Airport.

The sets were converted from conventional locomotive-hauled coaching stock in 1983–1984, and were used in combination with Class 73 electro-diesel locomotives and Class 489 luggage vans. Two variations were converted: 2-car sets (containing first class accommodation) and 3-car sets (containing standard class accommodation only). They are officially formed of two subclasses. The two-car units are classified as Class 488/2 and are numbered in the range 488201–488210 and the three-car sets are Class 488/3 and are numbered 488301–19.

== Operations ==
After privatisation, the entire Class 488 fleet passed to the Gatwick Express franchise. One unit, 488301, was withdrawn before privatisation, following an accident at Battersea Park railway station in 1985.

=== Gatwick Express ===
Immediately after privatisation the Class 488 fleet was used exclusively on Gatwick Express trains. They were painted in the Gatwick Express variation of InterCity livery. Some sets were later reliveried with Continental Airlines advertisements, including units 488203/04/07/08/10, 488304/05/10/14/19.

From 2000 onwards, new trains in the form of Class 460 units were introduced to replace the old stock. By 2004 just six sets, formed into three 5-car rakes, were still in use with Gatwick Express. By January 2005 this had decreased to four sets. The sets were used sporadically during early 2005 but their use declined as the Class 460 reliability improved. Their final scheduled use was on 28 July following a special trip involving the two remaining Class 73 locomotives. They were replaced by two Class 458 units hired from South West Trains, although these were returned in 2006.

They were used a few times after this date for emergency cover but were fully withdrawn soon after.

=== Network Rail ===
After retirement from Gatwick Express several sets were purchased by Network Rail for use as test trains or simply as brake-force runners. These sets were repainted into either the now obsolete Railtrack blue/lime green livery or the new Network Rail yellow livery. Two sets, 8307 and 8309, were reclassified as Class 910 departmental units and renumbered 910002 and 910001 respectively. In addition, two coaches were converted for departmental use with Network Rail:

- 72503 (ex 488204) - converted to hot-box detection coach no. 977983
- 72715 (ex 488316) - converted to structure-gauging train coach no. 977985

=== Northern Ireland Railways ===
In 2001 eight carriages were sold to Northern Ireland Railways for further use as locomotive-hauled stock in combination with the 111 Class locomotive, and renumbered 8941 to 8948.

- 72605 (ex 488305) - renumbered 8943
- 72609 (ex 488305) - renumbered 8944
- 72626 (ex 488314) - renumbered 8945
- 72627 (ex 488314) - renumbered 8946
- 72634 (ex 488318) - renumbered 8941
- 72637 (ex 488318) - renumbered 8942
- 72646 (ex 488319) - renumbered 8947
- 72647 (ex 488319) - renumbered 8948

The NIR coaches were withdrawn on 19 January 2005, but were re-introduced in September 2006 to provide extra capacity on the Portadown to Belfast Central service, making one trip every morning. (Coaches 943+944 did not re-enter service and were used for parts). In 2009 the locomotives and coaches were due to be converted to push-pull operation following the purchase by NIR of a DBSO last used by National Express East Anglia. However, this never happened and the entire fleet was withdrawn on 18 June 2009.

=== Ministry of Defence ===
- 488210 has been sold to the Ministry of Defence for use at Marchwood Military Port in Hampshire. It has replaced two former Class 501 vehicles as passenger vehicles for personnel movement around the site.

== Preservation ==
Several complete sets have been preserved. These are listed below.

- 488202 - Ecclesbourne Valley Railway
- 488206 - Barry Tourist Railway
- 488311 - Barry Tourist Railway

In addition, 72641 is preserved at Dalton and 72707 the Lincolnshire Wolds Railway. Ian Welch of the Mainline Steam Trust in New Zealand has purchased a number of ex-BR MkII cars formerly used on this service. Three cars comprising set 488313 (TSOLH 72624 and 72625, TSOL 72172) and a further two from 488209 (TFOH 72508 and TSOH 72644) arrived in New Zealand in 2008, still bearing the Intercity livery with 'Gatwick Express' branding. Most of the cars are in interim storage at Hutt Workshops in Wellington, while others have been trucked to the MLST Wellington base at Plimmerton.

These cars at present have not been equipped with bogies, and are transferred from Hutt to MLST Wellington by road. They will be fitted with either x-28020 bogies ex-FM guard's vans, or x-27750 'Kinki' bogies ex-FS steam-heating vans as part of the overhaul to bring them up to code-compliance for operation in New Zealand. Unlike most MkII cars in New Zealand, they are receiving only minor modifications to allow them to run in New Zealand, and will receive new numbers. They will also receive new names as well as the new MLST MkII livery of Pearl Grey roof with Midnight Blue body and white window band.

The ex-NIR carriages are now owned by RPSI, and currently in storage until they can join the RPSI's existing Mk2 fleet sometime in 2019.

== Fleet status ==
| Key: | In service | Withdrawn | Preserved | Departmental Use | Further Use | Scrapped |

Class 488/2

| Unit No. | Vehicle Numbers | | | | Livery | Operator | Withdrawn | Status |
| Unit No. | TFOH | | TSOH | | Livery | Operator | Withdrawn | Status |
|---|---|---|---|---|---|---|---|---|
| 488201 | 72500 | ex 3413 | 72638 | ex 6068 | Gatwick Express | Cotswold Rail | 2002 | Scrapped (2004) |
| 488202 | 72501 | ex 3382 | 72617 | ex 6086 | Gatwick Express | Gatwick Express | 2005 | Preserved |
| 488203 | 72502 | ex 3321 | 72640 | ex 6097 | Gatwick Express (Advertising) | Network Rail | 2002 | Scrapped, 72640 scrapped 2007. |
| 488204 | 72503 | ex 3407 | 72641 | ex 6079 | Gatwick Express (Advertising) | Network Rail | 2002 | 72503 departmental service, 72641 preserved. |
| 488205 | 72504 | ex 3406 | 72628 | ex 6058 | Gatwick Express | Gatwick Express | 2002 | Scrapped (2003) |
| 488206 | 72505 | ex 3415 | 72629 | ex 6048 | Gatwick Express | Gatwick Express | 2005 | Preserved |
| 488207 | 72506 | ex 3335 | 72642 | ex 6076 | Gatwick Express (Advertising) | Cotswold Rail | 2002 | Scrapped (2004) |
| 488208 | 72507 | ex 3412 | 72643 | ex 6040 | Gatwick Express (Advertising) | GB Railfreight | 2002 | Sent for Scrap 29/04/09 |
| 488209 | 72508 | ex 3409 | 72644 | ex 6039 | Gatwick Express | Gatwick Express | 2004 | Sold to New Zealand-based Mainline Steam Trust |
| 488210 | 72509 | ex 3398 | 72635 | ex 6128 | Gatwick Express | Gatwick Express | 2002 | Sold to MoD for use at Marchwood Military Port. For sale. |

Class 488/3

| Unit No. | Vehicle Numbers | | | | | | Livery | Operator | Withdrawn | Status |
| Unit No. | TSOLH | | TSOL | | TSOLH | | Livery | Operator | Withdrawn | Status |
|---|---|---|---|---|---|---|---|---|---|---|
| 488301 | 72600 | ex-6125 | 72700 | ex-6131 | 72601 | ex-6133 | InterCity | British Rail | 1985 | Scrapped (1987) |
| 488302 | 72602 | ex 6130 | 72701 | ex 6088 | 72604 | ex 6087 | Gatwick Express | Gatwick Express | 2003 | Scrapped (2003) |
| 488303 | 72603 | ex 6093 | 72702 | ex 6099 | 72608 | ex 6077 | Gatwick Express | Network Rail | 2002 | Scrapped, 72603 scrapped 2007 and 72608 2009. |
| 488304 | 72606 | ex 6084 | 72703 | ex 6075 | 72611 | ex 6083 | Gatwick Express | Gatwick Express | 2002 | Scrapped (2010). |
| 488305 | 72605 | ex 6082 | 72704 | ex 6132 | 72609 | ex 6080 | Northern Ireland Railways | Northern Ireland Railways | 2009 | Preserved |
| 488306 | 72607 | ex 6020 | 72705 | ex 6032 | 72610 | ex 6074 | Gatwick Express | Cotswold Rail | 2002 | Scrapped (2004) |
| 488307 | 72612 | ex 6156 | 72706 | ex 6143 | 72613 | ex 6126 | Railtrack Blue/Green | Network Rail | 2004 | Renumbered 910002, 72706 scrapped 2006. |
| 488308 | 72614 | ex 6090 | 72707 | ex 6127 | 72615 | ex 5938 | Railtrack Blue/Green | Network Rail | - | In service, 72614 scrapped 2014, 72707 preserved. |
| 488309 | 72616 | ex 6007 | 72708 | ex 6095 | 72639 | ex 6070 | Railtrack Blue/Green | Network Rail | 2004 | Renumbered 910001, 72708 scrapped 2008. |
| 488310 | 72618 | ex 6044 | 72709 | ex 5982 | 72619 | ex 5909 | Gatwick Express | Gatwick Express | 2002 | Scrapped (2012). |
| 488311 | 72620 | ex 6140 | 72710 | ex 6003 | 72621 | ex 6108 | Gatwick Express | Gatwick Express | 2005 | Preserved |
| 488312 | 72622 | ex 6004 | 72711 | ex 6109 | 72623 | ex 6118 | Gatwick Express | GB Railfreight | 2002 | Sent for scrap 29/04/09 |
| 488313 | 72624 | ex 5972 | 72712 | ex 6091 | 72625 | ex 6085 | Gatwick Express | Gatwick Express | 2004 | Sold to New Zealand-based Mainline Steam Trust |
| 488314 | 72626 | ex 6017 | 72713 | ex 6023 | 72627 | ex 5974 | Northern Ireland Railways | Northern Ireland Railways | 2009 | Preserved |
| 488315 | 72636 | ex 6071 | 72714 | ex 6092 | 72645 | ex 5942 | Gatwick Express | GB Railfreight | 2002 | Sent for scrap 29/04/09 |
| 488316 | 72630 | ex 6094 | 72715 | ex 6019 | 72631 | ex 6096 | Railtrack Blue/Green | Network Rail | - | In service |
| 488317 | 72632 | ex 6072 | 72716 | ex 6114 | 72633 | ex 6129 | Gatwick Express | Gatwick Express | 2003 | Sent for scrap |
| 488318 | 72634 | ex 6089 | 72717 | ex 6069 | 72637 | ex 6098 | Northern Ireland Railways | Northern Ireland Railways | 2009 | Preserved |
| 488319 | 72646 | ex 6078 | 72718 | ex 5979 | 72647 | ex 6081 | Northern Ireland Railways | Northern Ireland Railways | 2009 | Preserved |
