= British Rail Class 460 =

Class of British electric multiple-unit trains built in 1999-2001

British Rail Class 460 Coradia Juniper
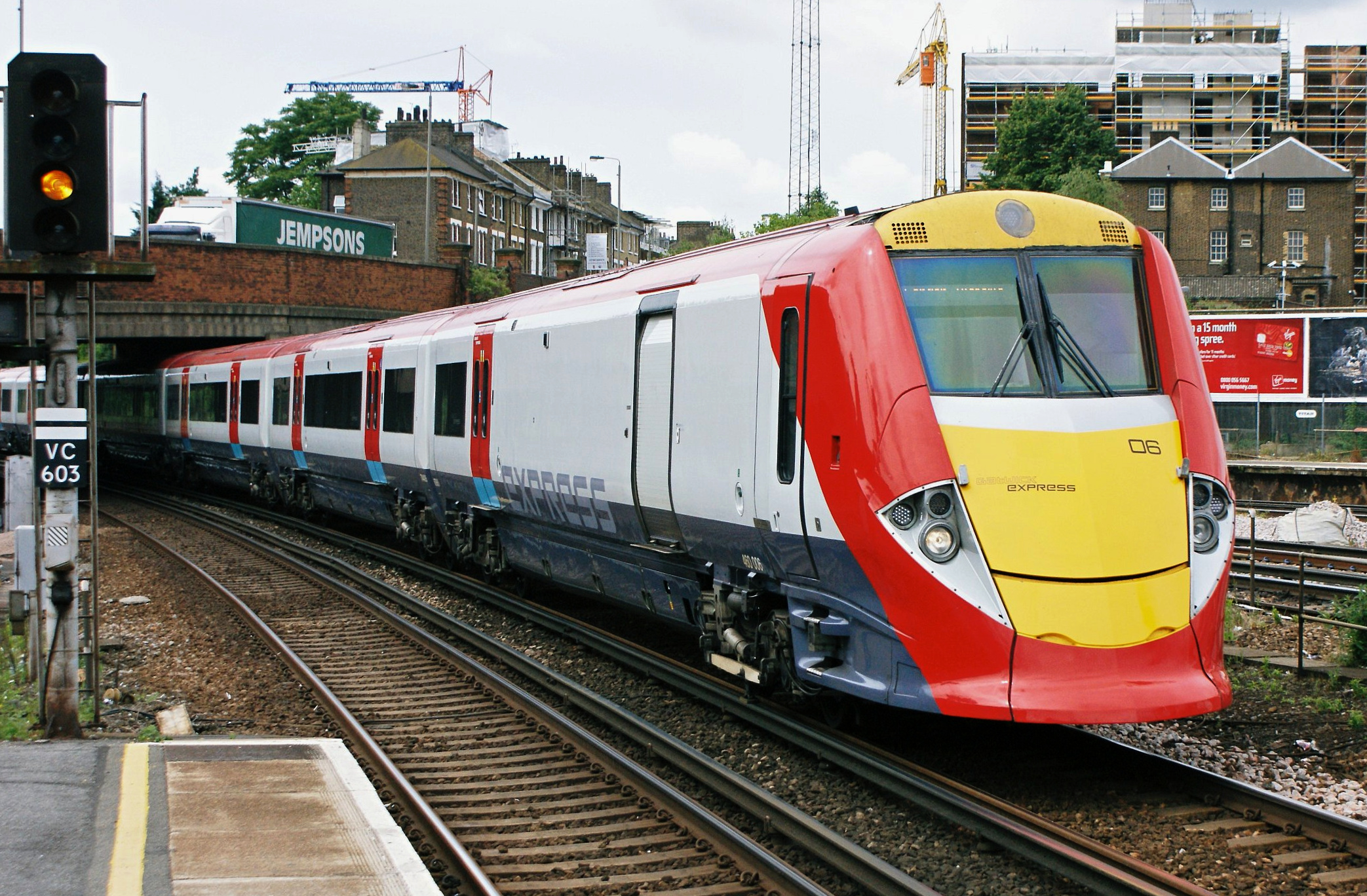
- Class 460 at Clapham Junction in 2008, showing the DMLFO vehicle's luggage compartment

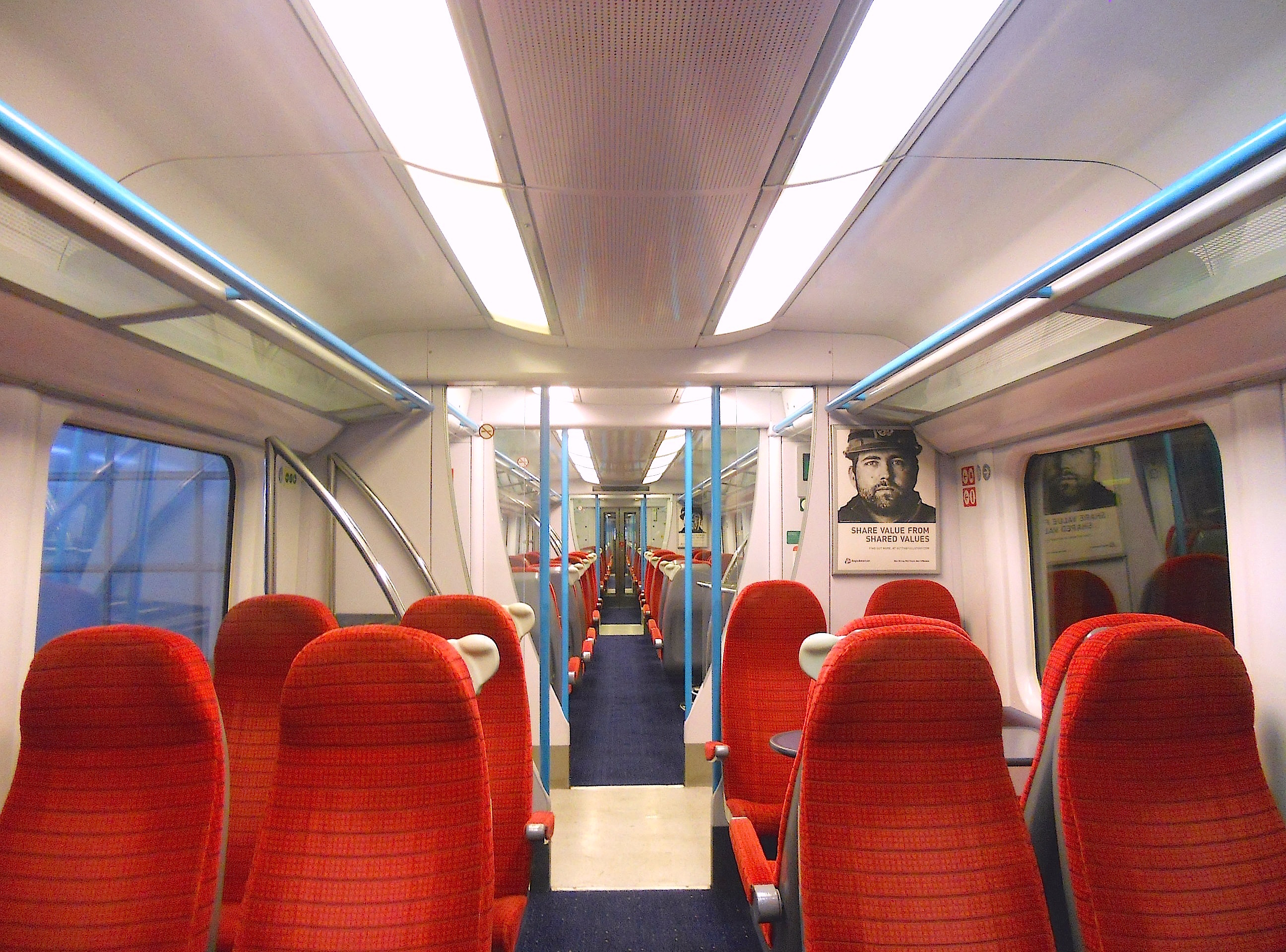
- Standard-class interior of a Class 460 unit
- In service: 2000–15 September 2012
- Manufacturer: Alstom
- Built at: Washwood Heath, Birmingham
- Family name: Coradia Juniper
- Replaced: Class 73 locomotives, Class 488 trailers & 489 GLVs
- Constructed: 1999–2001
- Number built: 8
- Number preserved: 0; (All were converted into Class 458/5)
- Successor: Class 442
- Formation: 8 cars per unit: DMLFO-TFO-TCO-MSO-MSO-TSO-MSO-DMSO
- Design code: 8-GAT
- Fleet numbers: 460001–460008
- Capacity: 366 seats
- Owner: Porterbrook
- Operator: Gatwick Express
- Depot: Stewarts Lane (London)

Specifications
- Car body construction: Steel
- Train length: 162 m (531 ft 6 in)
- Car length: DMxO: 21.05 m (69 ft 1 in) (Note: Excluding nose cone.); Others: 19.94 m (65 ft 5 in)
- Width: 2.80 m (9 ft 2 in)
- Height: 3.77 m (12 ft 4 in)
- Doors: Dual-leaf sliding plug
- Maximum speed: 100 mph (161 km/h)
- Traction motors: 10 × Alstom T3517 three-phase AC (2 per motor car)
- Power output: 2,704 kW (3,626 hp)
- Electric systems: 750 V DC third rail
- Current collection: Contact shoe
- Bogies: Alstom ACR
- Safety systems: AWS; TPWS
- Coupling system: As built: Tightlock; Later: Scharfenberg Type 330; (for rescue only)
- Multiple working: Not fitted
- Track gauge: 1,435 mm (4 ft 8 1/2 in) standard gauge

The British Rail Class 460 Coradia Juniper (8-GAT) was a class of electric multiple-unit passenger trains built by Alstom at Washwood Heath between 1999 and 2001. They were part of Alstom's Coradia Juniper family, which also includes Classes 334 and 458.

For the entirety of their service life they operated Gatwick Express services between London Victoria and Gatwick Airport. Following their withdrawal by Gatwick Express in 2012, the fleet was merged with the mechanically similar Class 458 fleet and extensively rebuilt to form a fleet of 36 units—designated Class 458/5—that was used by South Western Railway from 2013 until its retirement in 2026. (Note: 28 of the 36 Class 458/5s were converted into 458/4s between 2022 and 2024, whilst the remaining 458/5s until their retirement in 2026.)

== History ==
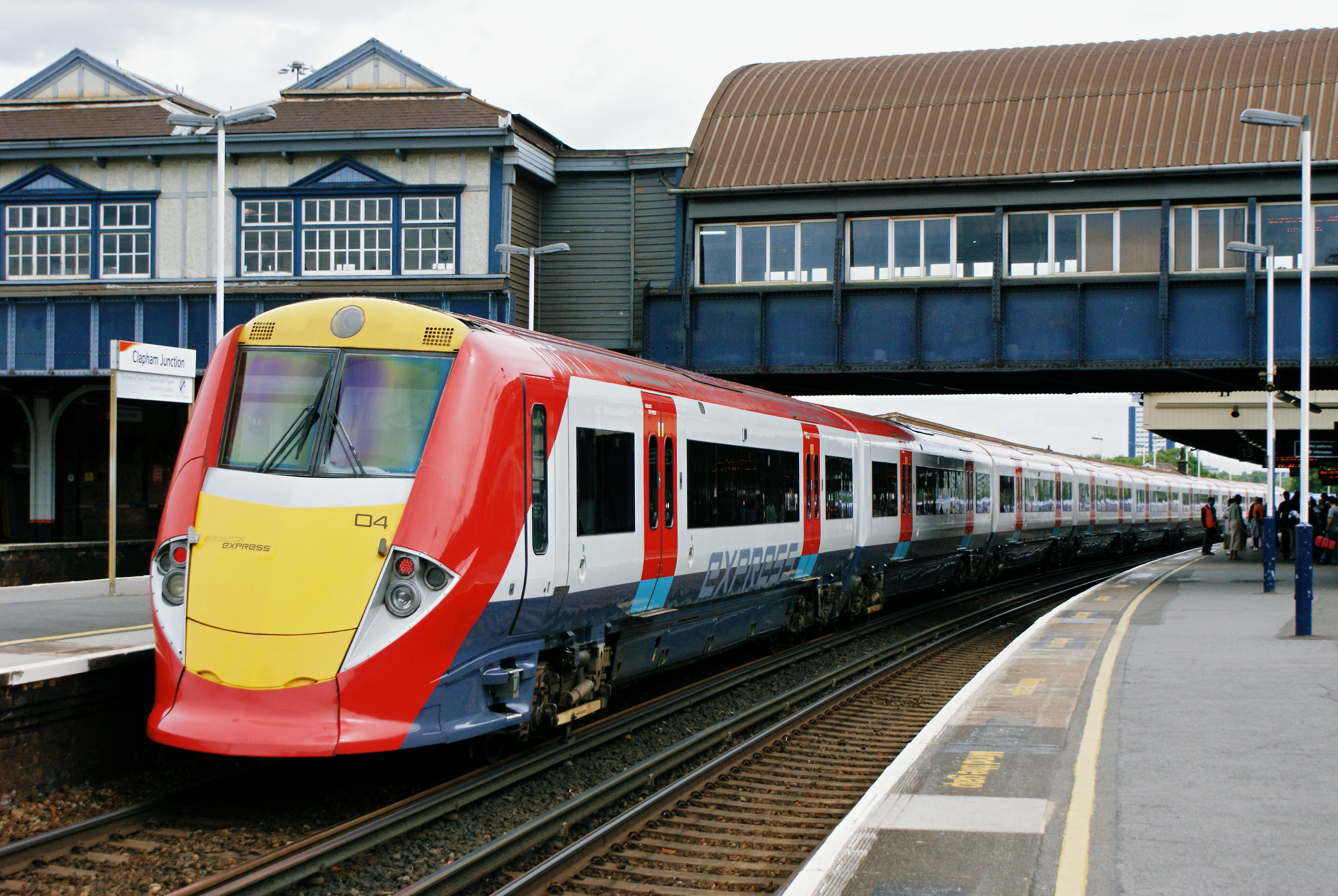
A Class 460 in 2008

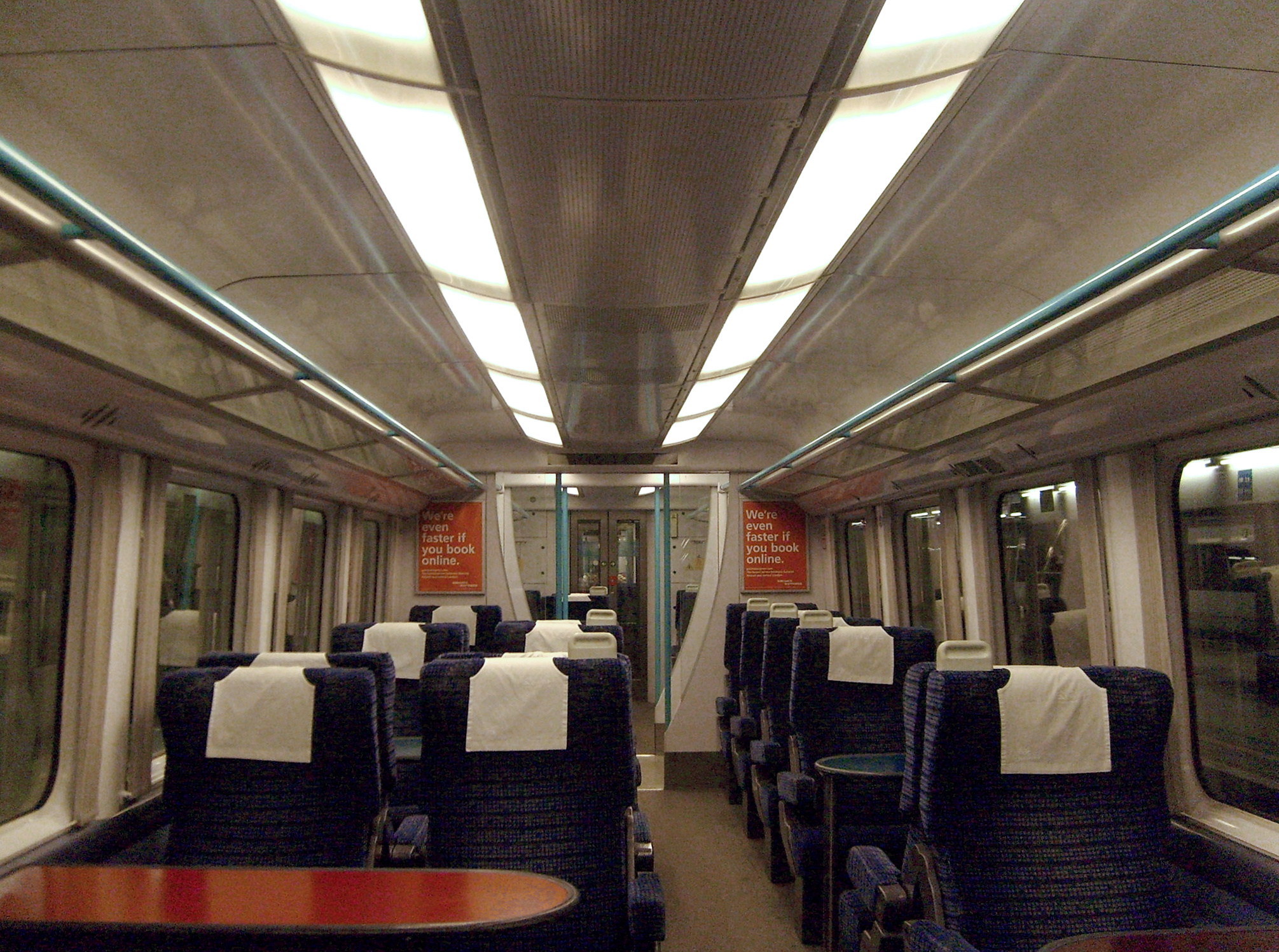
The first-class interior of a Class 460 unit

National Express (NX) began operating the Gatwick Express franchise in April 1996, having been awarded a 15-year contract to do so by the Director of Passenger Rail Franchising as part of the privatisation of British Rail. The company was required as part of the award to replace the existing Gatwick Express rolling stock, which had already been in service for more than 12 years when National Express had inherited it from British Rail. Accordingly, NX and rolling stock lessor Porterbrook placed an order with Alstom for the construction and delivery of eight eight-car units, enough to run services at 15-minute intervals at peak times.

All eight units, numbered 460001–460008, were manufactured at the former Metro-Cammell works at Washwood Heath in Birmingham, which Alstom had acquired in 1989. Each unit was formed of two motor cars with driver's cabs, three intermediate motor cars, and three intermediate trailer cars. One driving car, coded DMLFO and usually kept at the London end of the train, consisted of a large luggage compartment and a small section of first-class seating, while the other driving car was fitted with standard-class seating throughout. The fibreglass nosecones—which earned the class the nickname Darth Vaders among some rail enthusiasts—concealed the anti-climbers and an emergency coupler. One bogie on each motor car was fitted with traction motors.

Delivery of the new units began in 2000, but their entry into service was delayed by a number of defects – particularly concerning the braking systems, air-conditioning, and Train Management System (TMS) software. Only after an extensive program of repairs and modifications by Alstom did the fleet's reliability reach a level sufficient to allow full withdrawal of the ex-BR stock in 2005.

On 22 June 2008 the lease for the Class 460 fleet was transferred to Southern when the standalone Gatwick Express franchise was merged into the Southern-operated South Central franchise, as part of a plan to use Gatwick Express services to provide extra capacity on the Brighton Main Line south of Gatwick Airport. Because the Class 460 fleet was too small to support both the extension to Brighton and the existing 15-minute frequency, Southern leased and refurbished a number of Class 442 units to work alongside the Coradia Junipers when the extended timetable took effect in December 2008.

Following the June 2009 renewal of their contract to operate the South Central franchise, Southern leased and refurbished the remainder of the Class 442 fleet for use on Gatwick Express services. This enabled the gradual withdrawal of the Class 460 fleet, which began in 2010 and was completed by September 2012.

== Conversion to Class 458/5 ==
South West Trains, operator of the South Western franchise from 1996 to 2017, had been experiencing a considerable shortage of passenger capacity on many of its suburban routes in the years immediately prior to 2012, which it attributed primarily to the fact that passenger numbers had increased dramatically without a corresponding increase in the size of their fleet. The company had suggested to the Department for Transport on at least three occasions that their fleet of Class 450 units should be enlarged, but had been turned down each time.

Rolling stock lessors Porterbrook, owners of the Class 460 fleet, also owned the Class 458/0 fleet of Alstom Coradia Juniper units that had been in use with South West Trains since February 2000. As an alternative to ordering new trains for SWT, Porterbrook proposed to enlarge the Class 458 fleet and reconfigure it for suburban services by using vehicles from the now-redundant Class 460 fleet. The process, budgeted at £42 million, would use 30 of the 48 Class 460 intermediate cars to extend each of the original 30 Class 458 units to five cars each, leaving six Class 460 units that had been reduced to five cars each. These would be comprehensively rebuilt to match the extended Class 458 units, for a total fleet of 36 five-car units that would be designated Class 458/5. The units of this "new" fleet would be used—either individually or in pairs of ten cars—to provide extra peak-time capacity on suburban services to and from London Waterloo.

The Department for Transport announced in December 2011 that it had accepted the proposal, and an agreement between Porterbrook and South West Trains was signed in January 2012. SWT's fleet director noted that while the project was "much more complicated ... than buying new trains", it was also "significantly cheaper", and industry observers suggested that Porterbrook also benefited significantly in that it wasn't left with the burden of having to find a new user for, or scrapping, the Class 460 fleet.

The primary contract for delivering the project was awarded to Alstom, who appointed Wabtec to perform the conversion work on their behalf. In the first phase of the project, all 48 Class 460 intermediate vehicles were sent to Wabtec's Doncaster Works to be rebuilt and refitted. Various items of electrical and mechanical equipment such as compressors and traction motors were rearranged as required depending on whether the vehicle was one of the 30 to be inserted into original Class 458 units, or one of the 18 that would remain in the six Class 460 formations.

At the same time, 12 of the 16 driving vehicles from the Class 460 fleet (all eight DMSOs and four of the eight DMLFOs) were rebuilt by Wabtec subsidiary Brush Traction at their workshops in Loughborough, where their original driver's cabs were replaced with newly-fabricated versions that included gangways and Voith automatic couplers of the same types used on Class 444 and 450 units. The four selected DMLFO vehicles had their luggage compartments converted to additional passenger saloon space, and their roller-shutter external doors were replaced with power-operated plug doors taken from the other four DMLFO vehicles.

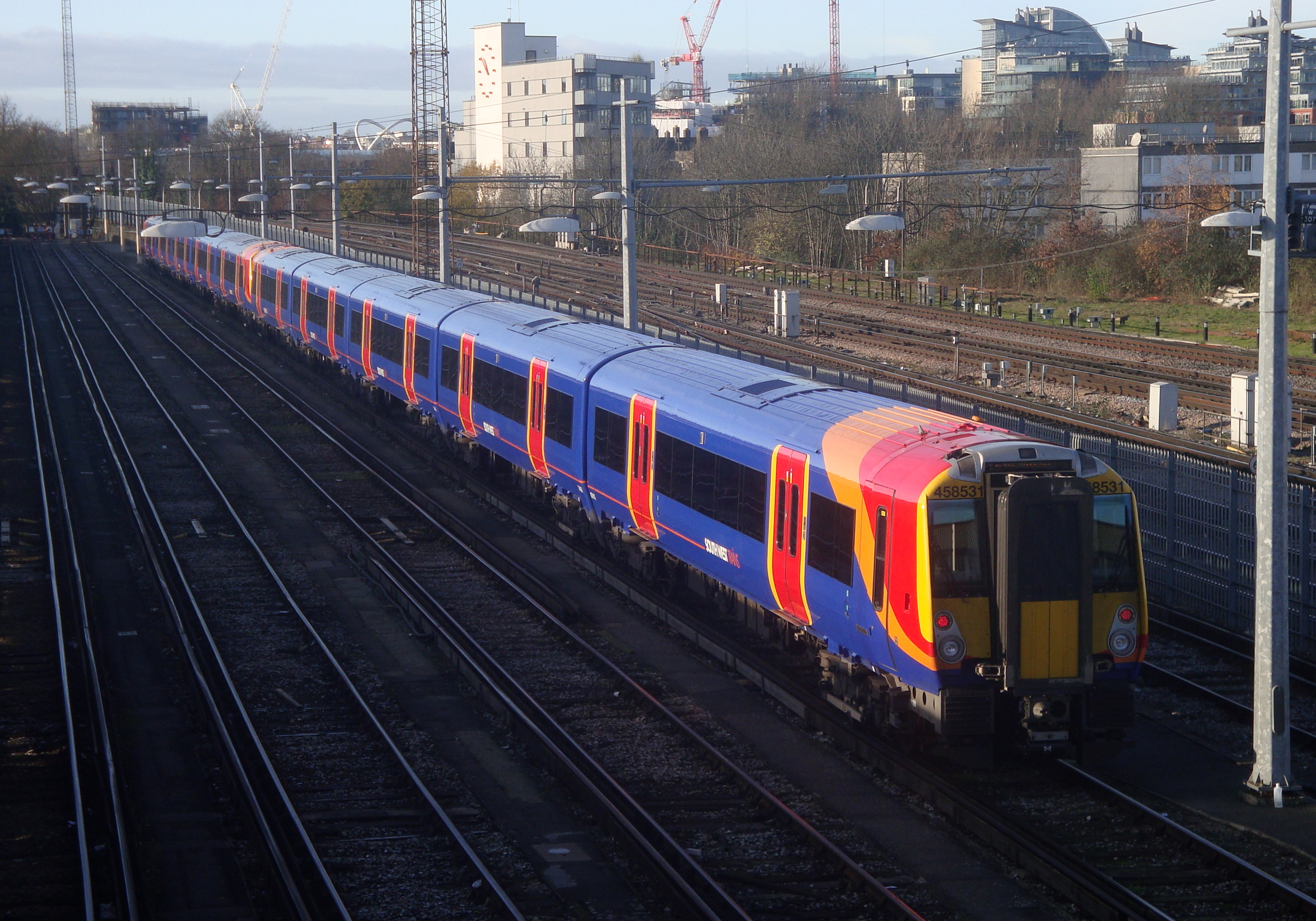
Two Class 458/5 units soon after being rebuilt. The continuous window band along the vehicle's side only appears on former Class 460 vehicles – original Class 458 vehicles have windows separated by bodywork.

Additional modifications included re-gearing the traction motors to reduce the train's maximum speed from 100 mph (161 km/h) to 75 mph (121 km/h), both to reduce the likelihood of overheating when making frequent stops and starts, and because the higher speed was unnecessary on suburban services in any case. New Train Management System (TMS) software was developed to be compatible across the entire Class 458/5 fleet, simplifying maintenance and improving reliability. An Automatic Selective Door Opening (ASDO) system was installed for use at a small number of stations where it was impractical to lengthen platforms. The vehicle interiors were refurbished and reconfigured as standard-class only, with 4-abreast seating and a wider aisle throughout. The units were also repainted into SWT's blue livery, matching the Class 450 fleet.

SWT expected to receive the first two converted Class 460 units in May 2013—in time for them to enter service the following November—but due to delays in production the initial delivery didn't take place until October. Following testing and staff training, entry into passenger service was achieved in March 2014. Once the first four ex-460 units had been delivered and accepted for service, SWT were able to start sending original Class 458/0 units for rebuilding. These units received the same modifications as the Class 460 conversions, leaving SWT and Porterbrook with a single mechanically-homogenous Class 458/5 fleet.

Following the conclusion of the conversion project the four Class 460 DMLFO vehicles that had not been rebuilt were stripped for spare parts and later scrapped.

== Fleet details ==
Class	Status	No. Built	Year built	Cars per Set	Unit nos.
460	Converted to 458/5	8	1999–2001	8	460001–460008

=== Illustration ===
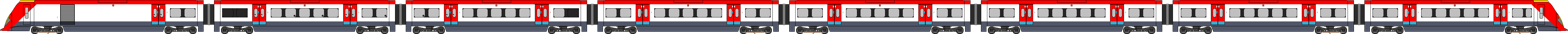
Illustration of a Class 460 unit
