= Gatwick Express =

English high-frequency rail passenger service

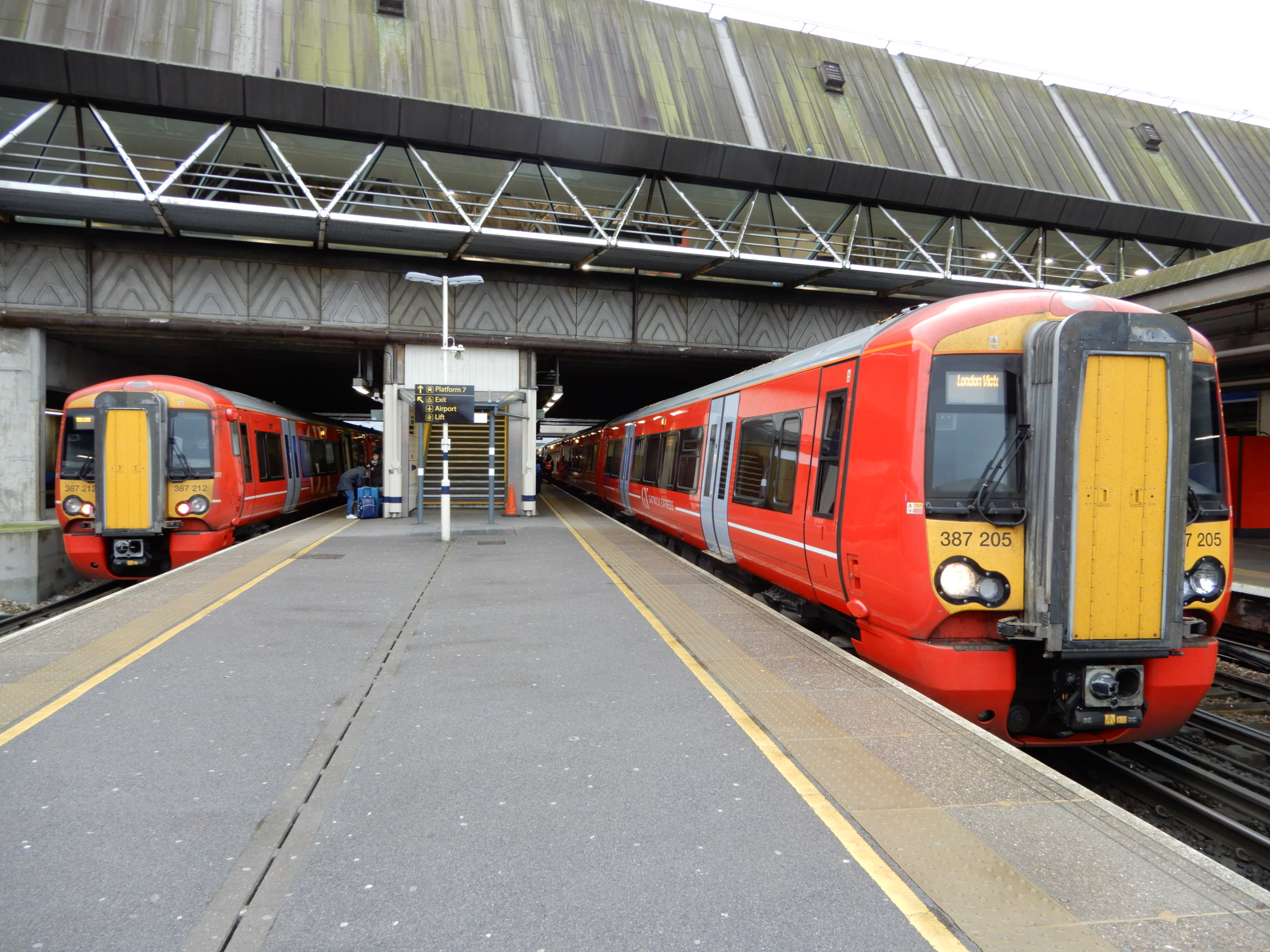
- Gatwick Express Class 387 at Gatwick Airport

Overview
- Franchises: Gatwick Trains; 28 April 1996 – 22 June 2008; Part of the South Central (incl Gatwick Express) franchise 22 June 2008 – 25 July 2015; Part of the Thameslink, Southern and Great Northern franchise 26 July 2015 – 31 May 2026
- Main route: London Victoria – Gatwick Airport
- Other route: Brighton
- Fleet: Class 387
- Stations called at: 7
- Stations operated: 1
- Parent company: Greater Thameslink Railway
- Reporting mark: GX

Technical
- Length: 81.4 km (50.6 miles)

Other
- Website: www.gatwickexpress.com

Gatwick Express is an express rail passenger service between London Victoria, Gatwick Airport, Haywards Heath and Brighton in South East England. It is the brand name used by Greater Thameslink Railway, a train operating company which has been state-owned since 31 May 2026.

Trains have regularly served Gatwick Airport since the opening of its rebuilt railway station in May 1958. Prior to the 1980s, these services were relatively slow and without any particular priority; this led to the Gatwick Liaison Group advocating for a non-stop service to London during the late 1970s and early 1980s. Accordingly, during May 1984, the Gatwick Express service was launched using air-conditioned InterCity carriages. British Rail operated Gatwick Express through to its privatisation in April 1996, after which National Express took over operations under a franchising arrangement. One of the franchise commitments made by National Express was the replacement of the inherited rolling stock with new-build trains for Gatwick Express; this led to the introduction of the Class 460 Junipers during the late 1990s and early 2000s.

In June 2008, Gatwick Express ceased to exist as a separate franchise; it was merged into the Southern train operating company, although it continued to be maintained as a separate identity. Additional rolling stock in the form of the 442 (5WES) Wessex Electrics were introduced. However, figures such as the Chairman of Gatwick Airport, Roy McNulty, publicly criticised Gatwick Express, claiming its services to be overcrowded and the rolling stock outdated. In July 2015, Southern including the Gatwick Express service was merged into Govia Thameslink Railway. Since January 2016, both Oyster cards and contactless payment cards have been accepted for travel between London Victoria and Gatwick Airport. The introduction of Class 387/2s during the 2010s was objected to by the Associated Society of Locomotive Engineers and Firemen (ASLEF) trade union, but the dispute was later resolved.

All Gatwick Express services were suspended on 30 March 2020 as a result of the COVID-19 pandemic. Limited services resumed briefly during December 2021, but were suspended again only weeks later due to redevelopment works at Gatwick Airport station as well as COVID-related factors. A reduced service of two trains per hour resumed on 3 April 2022, and the full four trains per hour service will resume from December 2026.

Gatwick Express passenger services, along with all others operated by Govia Thameslink Railway, transferred to state-owned Greater Thameslink Railway on 31 May 2026.

== History ==
=== Background ===
During the early 1950s, Gatwick Airport expanded substantially, leading to Gatwick railway station being rebuilt and integrated into the airport's terminal via an upper level concourse designed by British Rail Southern Region. On 27 May 1958, the rebuilt station, Gatwick Airport, opened with a regular train service. Initially, the rail service was provided entirely by standard London to Brighton stopping services; however, more trains began to call with the introduction of the summer timetable in June 1958. One of the key elements of this expanded service was the extension of Three Bridges to Bognor Regis stopping services to start and terminate at London Victoria. These trains would run through a reversible platform at Gatwick where a portion would detach and wait in the platform for passengers until the next up train from Bognor Regis was attached and the train would depart for Victoria. For this service British Rail used a small batch of seven Class 402 2HALs in order to work with the trains used on the Bognor Regis services, suitable for airport link use because of their larger luggage space.

This situation lasted until the early 1970s when increased passenger and luggage travel to the station was rendering the old system obsolete. British Rail therefore decided to adapt a number of Class 423 4VEPs with increased luggage capacity (at the expense of fewer second class seats) and were redesignated as Class 427 4VEGs. The service however remained much the same, with the units attaching and detaching from Bognor Regis bound services running via Redhill. This led to somewhat extended journey times which meant the service lacked any real purpose, as the faster services began calling at Gatwick Airport from the early 1970s, and made the option of travelling to Gatwick from London on the service lack appeal to those who knew better. At first the service from Bognor Regis, which by this stage only stopped at East Croydon, was branded Rapid City Link.

During 1975, British Airports Authority airport director John Mulkern, British Caledonian Airways chairman Adam Thomson and British Rail's Southern Region regional manager Bob Reid, formed the Gatwick Liaison Group to discuss matters of mutual interest. A subsidiary of this entity, the Gatwick Promotion Group, under the chairmanship of the airport's public relations manager David Hurst, was formed to market the airport. It was a long-term aim of the group to have a non-stop service between the airport and central London in order to counter the perceived distance from the capital, for both domestic and overseas passengers. One of the first successes of the group was to persuade the British Rail board to redevelop Gatwick station by building a raft over the platforms, and this was opened by British Rail chairman Peter Parker in 1980.

=== Express service ===
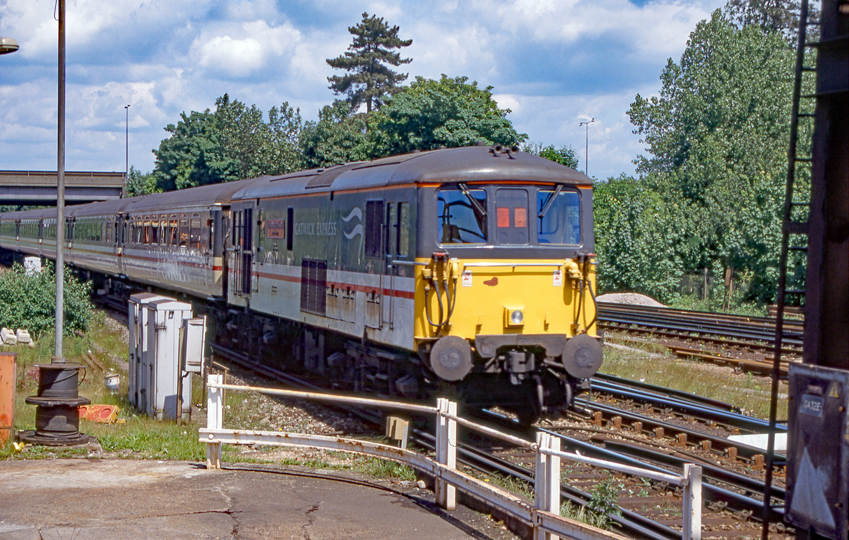
73213 University of Kent at Canterbury on Gatwick Express duties in 1998

In May 1984, the non-stop Gatwick Express service began, using Class 73s with Mark 2 carriages. Later, the duties were taken over by Class 488 and Class 489. A 30-minute journey time was advertised, although some journeys would take nearer 35 minutes, especially during peak hours.

=== Privatisation ===
Original privatisation era logo from 1994

Logo introduced by National Express and retained by Southern until 2016

Gatwick Express was the first portion of British Rail's InterCity sector to be converted into a separate train operating unit, ready for franchising as a private business with the assets transferred to Gatwick Express Limited in March 1994. The Gatwick Express franchise was awarded by the Director of Passenger Rail Franchising to National Express with the franchise starting on 28 April 1996.

=== Operated by Southern ===
In April 2007, the Department for Transport announced that the Gatwick Express franchise was to be incorporated into the South Central franchise and the services transferred to Southern on 22 June 2008. This reorganisation was part of a plan to use Gatwick Express services to provide extra capacity on the Brighton Main Line south of Gatwick Airport.

On 20 August 2008, the Department for Transport announced that Abellio, Govia, National Express and Stagecoach had been shortlisted to bid for the new South Central franchise. On 9 June 2009, the Department for Transport announced that Govia had retained the franchise, beginning on 20 September 2009.

=== Operated by Govia Thameslink Railway ===
The Department for Transport confirmed prior to the awarding of the new franchise that the Southern franchise would be merged at its conclusion in July 2015 into the proposed Thameslink, Southern and Great Northern franchise.

In March 2012, the Department for Transport announced that Abellio, FirstGroup, Govia, MTR and Stagecoach had been shortlisted to bid for the new franchise. The Invitation to Tender was to have been issued in October 2012, and the successful bidder announced in spring 2013. However, in the wake of the InterCity West Coast refranchising process collapsing, the Secretary of State for Transport announced in October 2012 that the process would be put on hold pending the results of a review.

With the last franchise expiring on 25 July 2015, the South Central franchise merged with the Thameslink Great Northern franchise to create Thameslink, Southern and Great Northern. This was operated by Govia Thameslink Railway, which was also owned by Southern's parent company, Govia. The Gatwick Express brand identity has been retained. Oyster cards and contactless payment cards have been accepted for travel between London Victoria and Gatwick Airport since January 2016.

=== Suspension ===
On 30 March 2020, all Gatwick Express services were suspended until further notice under a reduced timetable rapidly adopted in response to the COVID-19 pandemic. Some of Gatwick Express's Class 387/2 trains have been used by Southern on its East Coastway services between Brighton and Eastbourne, Hastings and Ore, on some Brighton Main Line services between Brighton and London Victoria, and on some West Coastway services between Brighton and West Worthing. During May 2021, nine Class 387/2s were transferred to Great Northern as replacements for Class 365s on services between London King's Cross and Cambridge, Ely, Peterborough and Stevenage; six of these trains were then leased to Great Western Railway to cover for Class 800s on services between London Paddington and Didcot Parkway.

During December 2021, the Gatwick Express briefly resumed on weekdays only, but was suspended after only two weeks due to engineering works and COVID-related developments. On 3 April 2022, Gatwick Express services restarted under a seven-day timetable; however, only two services per hour were initially ran between London and Gatwick instead of four per hour as they were prior to the pandemic. Govia Thameslink Railway attributed the work to redevelop Gatwick Airport station for this cutback.

== Services ==
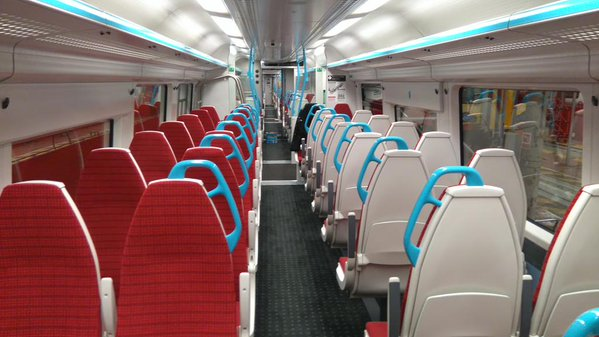
Interior of a Gatwick Express branded Class 387

Gatwick Express operates an express commuter and airport transfer service between London Victoria, Gatwick Airport, Haywards Heath and Brighton. Between 6:00 am and 9:00 am on weekdays, northbound services call additionally at Preston Park, Hassocks and Burgess Hill. Services stop additionally at the same stations in the southbound direction between 5:00 pm and 8:00 pm.

As of May 2025, the off-peak Monday–Saturday, with frequencies in 'trains per hour' (tph), consists of:

Route	tph	Calling at
London Victoria – Brighton	2	Gatwick Airport; Haywards Heath

On Sundays, Gatwick Express operates a half-hourly shuttle service between London Victoria and Gatwick Airport only.

=== Past services ===
From privatisation until December 2008, the service pattern was one train every 15 minutes non-stop between London Victoria and Gatwick Airport.

In April 2007, the Department for Transport announced that the Gatwick Express franchise was to be incorporated into the South Central franchise. as part of a plan to increase capacity on the Brighton Main Line. As a result, peak-time services were extended beyond Gatwick to/from Brighton from December 2008, with northbound trains running every 15 minutes in the morning peak and southbound trains to Brighton every 15 minutes in the evening peak. This change doubled the number of London-to-Brighton express trains during peak periods. Additional calls were made at Haywards Heath, Wivelsfield, Burgess Hill, Hassocks and/or Preston Park; the stopping pattern for northbound services was not regular but all stations received at least one train a day, while all services called at Haywards Heath; the southbound services were more structured, with all services calling at Haywards Heath and half-hourly services for Burgess Hill, Hassocks and Preston Park (no southbound trains served Wivelsfield).

As part of the December 2015 timetable, Gatwick Express began serving Brighton all day (except on Sundays), with half-hourly services in the off-peak and evenings (while the remaining services continue to terminate at Gatwick Airport). Unlike peak-time services, these call at no intermediate stations between Brighton and the airport. These services replaced the half-hourly "express" services operated by Southern (which did not call at Gatwick Airport).

In May 2018, the stopping pattern for peak-time services was changed: all calls at Wivelsfield and Preston Park stations were withdrawn, Hassocks is now served by all peak Gatwick Express services every 15 minutes, while Burgess Hill and Haywards Heath are served half-hourly (by alternate services) in both directions. Services to and from Preston Park were restored in May 2019, though, with half-hourly calls made by the same trains that stop at Burgess Hill.

=== Ticketing ===
London – Gatwick is one of the few journeys on the UK National Rail network for which tickets restricting travel to certain brands of service are available in addition to the option of standard inter-available fares for immediate travel as on all flows shared by different National Rail operators (although some restrictions may apply on cheaper tickets). Through tickets for which the Brighton Main Line is part of a permitted route are valid on the Gatwick Express service as with all other Govia Thameslink Railway services, the only exclusion being some tickets from London to stations south of Gatwick routed Not Gatwick Express.

Historically, standard Gatwick Express services did not charge penalty fares and permitted tickets to be purchased on board at no extra charge. Journeys to or from stations south of Gatwick were subject to penalty fares as normal. This rule applied to the six weekday services each way that start or end at Brighton. However, in December 2011 electronic ticket gates were installed at Gatwick Airport and London Victoria platforms 13 and 14 (where the Gatwick Express arrives and departs), meaning that tickets can no longer be bought on the train and must be purchased either in advance or at the station before boarding.

London Oyster Cards and contactless cards have been accepted for travel since January 2016 between London Victoria and Gatwick Airport. The fare is charged differently at the Gatwick Express gateline at London Victoria station compared to other platforms which Southern services use.

=== Performance ===
In May 2013, the Chairman of Gatwick Airport, Roy McNulty, criticised the Gatwick Express service for its overcrowding and old rolling stock. He said that the train service sometimes "at times veers towards Third World conditions" and that it gives air passengers arriving in the United Kingdom a bad first impression of the UK, and called for major improvements. Southern responded by stating that it had provided some 20,000 extra peak-hour seats every week on the London-Brighton line.

In August 2018, Govia Thameslink Railway was directed by the Advertising Standards Authority (an independent advertising regulator) to remove claims of a 30-minute journey time between London and Gatwick due to poor performance on the line.

== Rolling stock ==
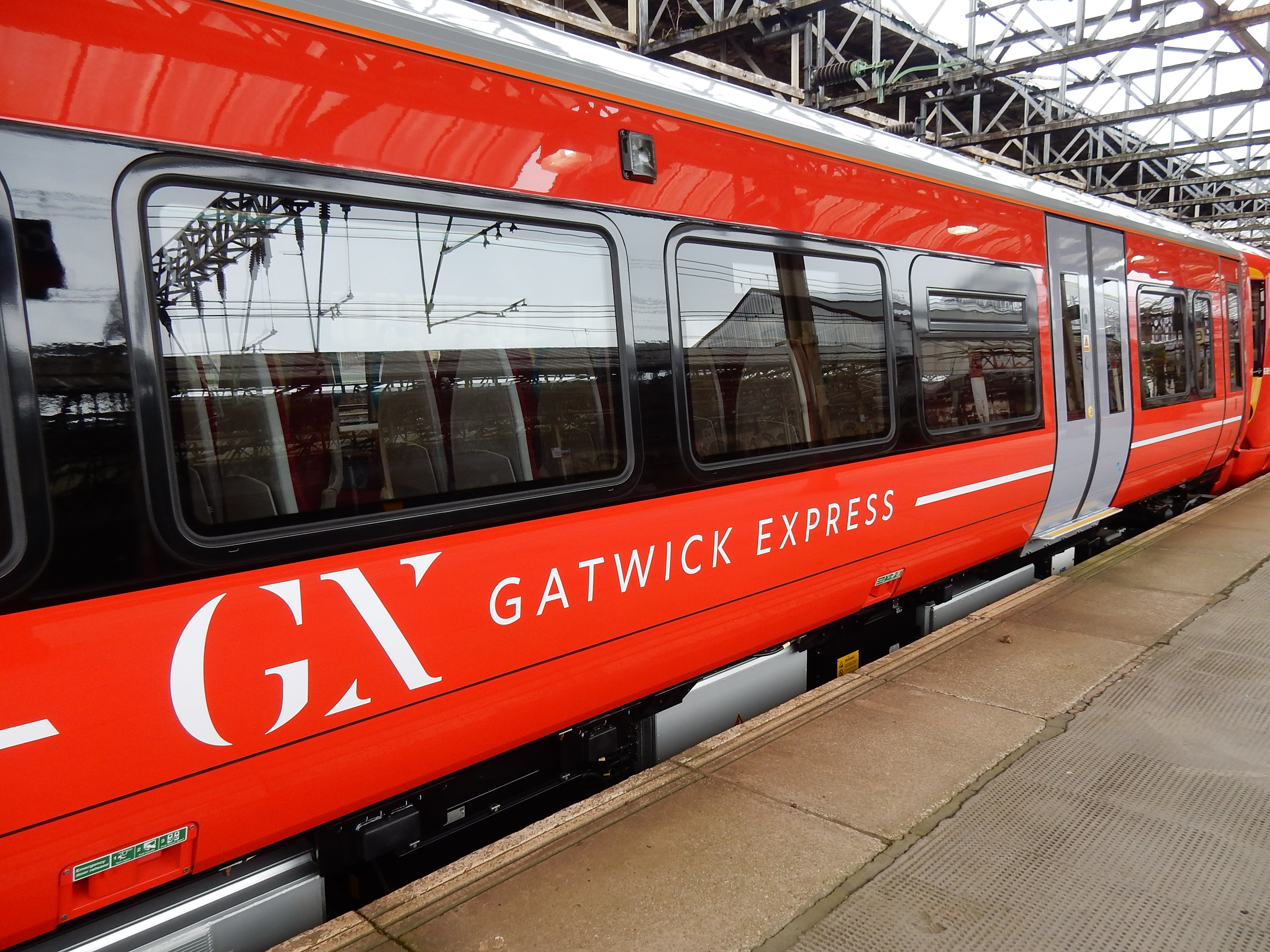
Exterior of a Class 387 passenger carriage

Govia Thameslink Railway operates a fleet of Gatwick Express branded Class 387/2s which it received in 2016. GTR placed a £145.2 million order with Bombardier for 27 sets of the type in November 2014 to replace the existing Class 442 Wessex Electrics.

The type underwent testing in July 2015, and began to enter passenger service in February 2016. The new trains have four carriages, compared with five for the Class 442, allowing three units to operate together to form a 12-coach train, whilst Class 442s can only form a ten-coach train. These trains also feature additional luggage space, wireless internet connectivity and passenger service updates.

In April 2016, drivers belonging to the Associated Society of Locomotive Engineers and Firemen (ASLEF) trade union refused to pick up passengers on the new Class 387 trains. The trains are fitted with "Driver-Only Operation" (DOO) capability, meaning that the driver closes the doors using CCTV and decides that it is safe to move off, rather than a guard. DOO had been used on the previous ten-car Class 442, but the union claimed that extending this to 12-car trains put too much pressure on the driver and was unsafe. In response, GTR took legal action, and the union ultimately dropped the claim.

The Gatwick Express branded fleet is maintained at Lovers Walk Depot with stabling facilities provided at Stewarts Lane depot. Some classified overhaul work has also been undertaken at Hornsey EMU Depot taking advantage of the unit's dual voltage capability.

=== Current fleet ===
Class	Image	Type	Top speed		Number	Built
Class	Image	Type	mph	km/h	Number	Built
387/2 Electrostar		EMU	110	180	18	2015–2016

=== Past fleet ===
Until 1984 the service was operated by Class 423 slam-door stock, coded 4-VEG (G for Gatwick).

From May 1984 Mark 2F stock released from Midland Main Line duties coupled to a Class 489 Gatwick Luggage Van took over the services, hauled by Class 73 locomotives.

A franchise commitment by National Express was the replacement of these with new stock, and eight Class 460 Junipers started to be delivered from January 1999. Because of reliability problems, some of the old stock remained in service until 2005.

To replace the last of the old stock, a pair of Class 458 Junipers were transferred from South West Trains for use as spares. They remained in their existing livery but with Gatwick Express branding and their seating was modified from high density 3+2 seating configuration to 2+2 configuration, some seating being replaced with luggage racks. However, these units never entered service and returned to South West Trains. The Class 460s were withdrawn from service in September 2012 to be merged with the mechanically similar Class 458 units used by South West Trains in order to provide more stock at peak times.

The Gatwick Express service received 17 refurbished Class 442 Wessex Electrics from South West Trains from December 2008, followed by a further seven through leases in 2009, after Southern retained the South Central franchise. The additional rolling stock allowed Southern to provide extra capacity on the Gatwick Express services extended to Brighton. The stock were replaced during 2016 by newly built Class 387/2s.

Class	Image	Type	Number	Cars	Built	Withdrawn
488/2		Converted MK2 carriages	10	2	1983–1984	2005
488/3		Converted MK2 carriages	19	3	1983–1984	2005
489 (GLV)		EMU	10	1	1983–1984	2005
460 (8GAT) Coradia Juniper		EMU	8	8	1999–2001	2012
442 (5WES) Wessex Electrics		EMU	16	5	1988–1989	2016
73		Electro-diesel locomotive	1		1962, 1965–1967	2019

== See also ==
- Heathrow Express
- Luton Airport Express
- Stansted Express
- Airport rail link

Preceded by InterCity; As part of British Rail	Operator of Gatwick Express franchise 1997–2008	Succeeded by Southern; South Central (incl Gatwick Express) franchise
Preceded by Gatwick Express; Gatwick Express franchise	Sub-brand of South Central (incl Gatwick Express) franchise 2008–2015	Succeeded by Govia Thameslink Railway; Thameslink, Southern and Great Northern franchise
Preceded by Southern; South Central (incl Gatwick Express) franchise	Sub-brand of Thameslink, Southern and Great Northern franchise 2015–2026	Succeeded by Greater Thameslink Railway
Preceded by Govia Thameslink Railway; Thameslink, Southern and Great Northern franchise	Sub-brand of Greater Thameslink Railway; 2026 – present	Incumbent
