= Thameslink, Southern and Great Northern franchise =

British railway management franchise

Thameslink, Southern and Great Northern
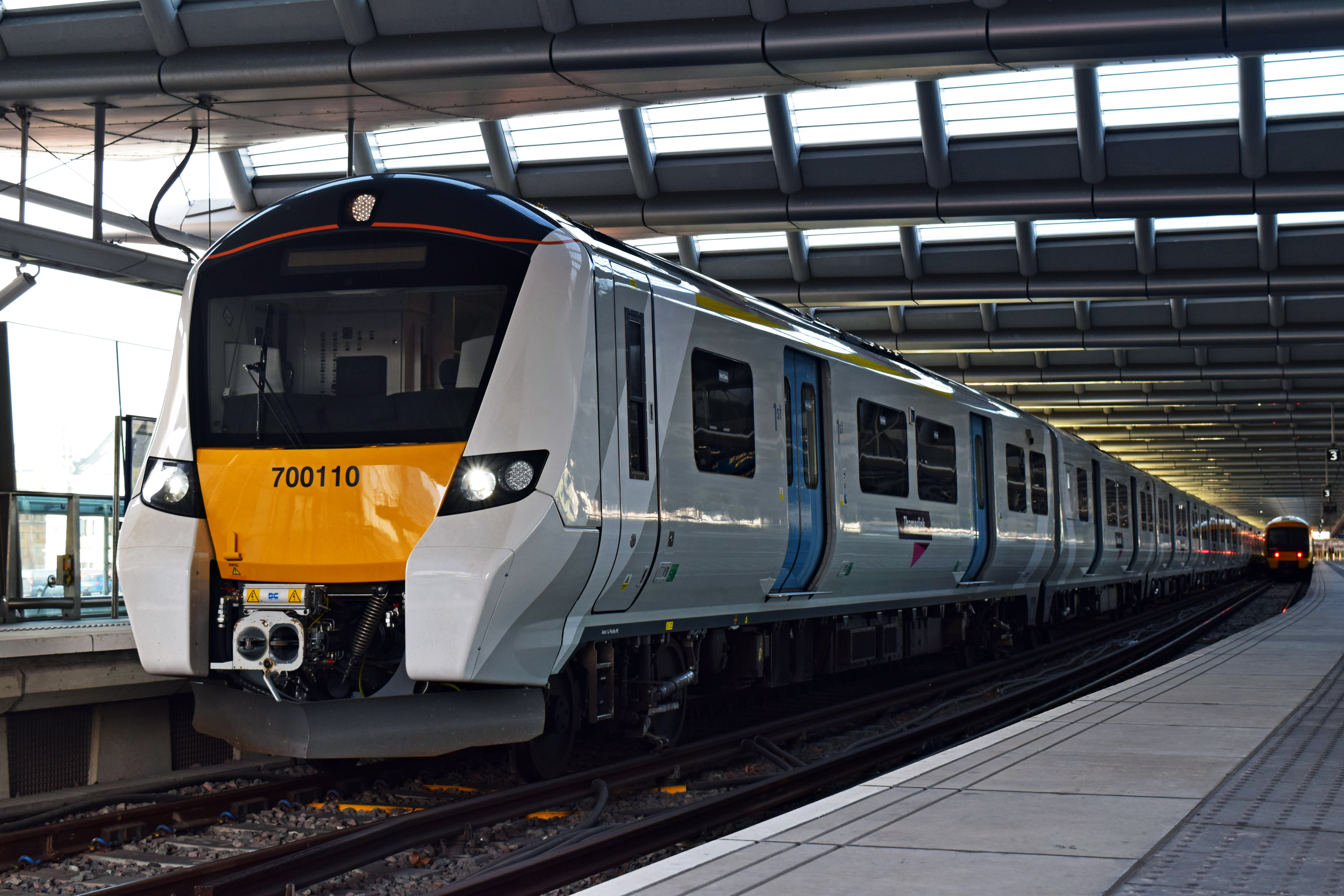
- Thameslink Class 700 at Blackfriars

Overview
- Operator: Greater Thameslink Railway
- Main Routes: Thameslink, Great Northern, Southern and Gatwick Express
- Stations operated: 236
- Dates of operation: 31 May 2026–present
- Predecessor: Govia Thameslink Railway

Technical
- Track gauge: 1,435 mm (4 ft 8 1/2 in) standard gauge
- Electrification: 25 kV 50 Hz AC OHLE; 750 V DC third rail
- Length: 1,149 km (714 miles)
Route map

Thameslink, Southern and Great Northern (TSGN) is a management contract for the provision of passenger services on the Thameslink and Great Northern routes to Bedford, Luton, Peterborough, King's Lynn, Cambridge, London King's Cross, London Moorgate, Sutton, Wimbledon and Brighton, as well as the whole Southern network (including the Gatwick Express). It has been operated by the UK government since 31 May 2026 through the DfTO's wholly owned subsidiary, Greater Thameslink Railway. It will be absorbed into Great British Railways following its legal incorporation.

Until 31 May 2026, the TSGN franchise was operated by Govia Thameslink Railway, owned by Govia, and was the largest railway franchise in the United Kingdom. As of March 2025, the operator employed 7,453 staff and managed 236 stations on a 1,149 km (714 mi) network, which provided 298 million annual passenger journeys.

== History ==
The Department for Transport (DfT) decided to create a new Thameslink, Southern and Great Northern franchise with the services jointly operated with Southeastern to be added in December 2014 and the entire South Central franchise in July 2015.

In March 2012, DfT announced Abellio, FirstGroup, Govia, MTR and Stagecoach had been shortlisted.

The invitation to tender was to have been issued in October 2012, with the successful bidder announced 4 – 6 months later. However, in the wake of the InterCity West Coast refranchising process collapsing, the government announced in October 2012 that the process would be put on hold pending the results of a review.

In January 2013, the government announced it would be exercising an option to extend the existing contract until March 2014.

== 2015–2021 franchise ==
In March 2013 the-then Secretary of State for Transport Patrick McLoughlin announced the franchise would again be extended until 13 September 2014, and that the future franchise would be a management style contract due to the level of investment and change on the route. In September 2013 a revised invitation to tender was issued. In May 2014, Govia was awarded the new franchise.

Now operated by Govia subsidiary Govia Thameslink Railway, the former First Capital Connect parts of the franchise returned to their former brand names Thameslink and Great Northern while the existing Southern and Gatwick Express brands were retained. The franchise is unusual as a management contract where fare income does not go to GTR, which is simply paid a fee for operating the service, so GTR carries less revenue risk. This form of franchise was chosen because of long-term engineering works anticipated around London, which would be a significant challenge to organise within the normal form of franchise.

From July 2015 when GTR took over the Southern services to March 2017, 7.7% of planned services have been cancelled or delayed by more than 30 minutes. The most important reason for the delays and cancellations were industry actions (38% of the total). 13% were caused by failures of track and Network Rail assets such as signalling systems. As the Department for Transport in the period from September 2014 to August 2017 has received £3.6 billion in fare revenue and had to pay only £2.8 billion in franchise payments to Govia, it made a profit for the taxpayer of £760 million.

In 2017, the Government confirmed it was considering the size of the franchise at its next renewal, indicating it could be broken up.

In May 2018, following the announcement of the renationalisation of InterCity East Coast franchise as London North Eastern Railway, Grayling revealed despite not reaching a decision on the future of Great Northern services beyond 2021 it had been proposed that Great Northern services could be merged with the London North Eastern Railway or transferred to London Overground.

== 2022–2026 direct award contract and renationalisation ==
In March 2022, GTR was given a direct award contract by DfT, replacing its franchise agreement, expiring on 1 April 2028.

The contract expiry was brought forward to 31 May 2026, at which point it was betaken over by DfT Operator before the formal establishment of the state-owned operator Great British Railways, which will operate most passenger rail services in England by the end of 2027.
