= Govia Thameslink Railway =

British train operating company

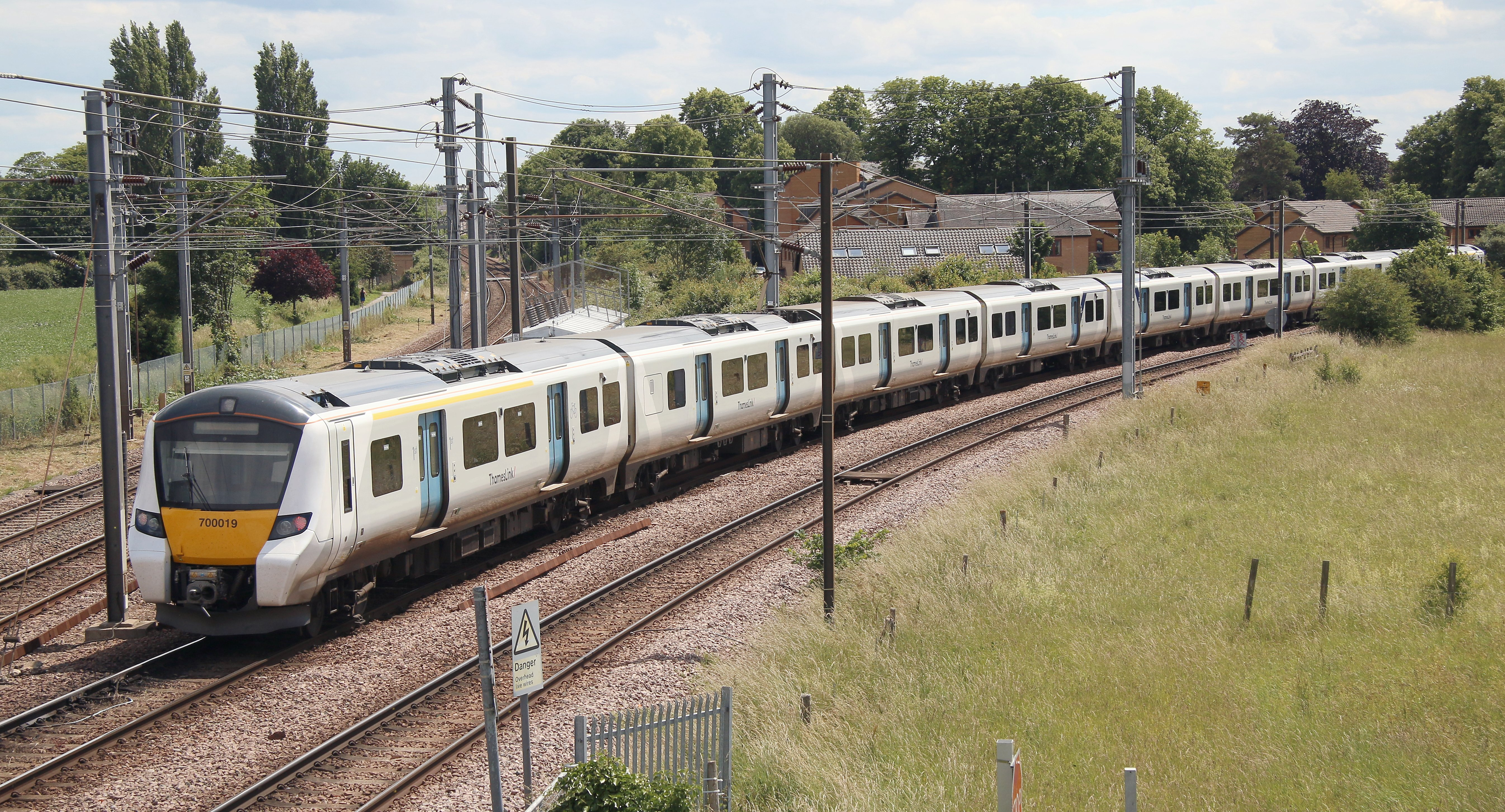
- A Thameslink Class 700 at Shepreth Branch Junction, south of Cambridge in 2019

Overview
- Franchises: Thameslink, Southern and Great Northern; 14 September 2014 – 31 May 2026
- Main regions: South East England; Greater London; East of England
- Stations operated: 238
- Parent company: Govia; (Go-Ahead Group 65%, Keolis 35%)
- Headquarters: London
- Reporting mark: GN, GX, SN, TL
- Successor: Greater Thameslink Railway

Other
- Website: gtrailway.com

Govia Thameslink Railway (GTR) was a British train operating company that operated the TSGN rail franchise. Within the franchise, GTR ran trains under the sub-brands: Thameslink, Great Northern, Southern, and Gatwick Express. GTR was a subsidiary of Govia, which was itself a joint venture between the British Go-Ahead Group (65%) and French company Keolis (35%).

The franchise was awarded, after repeated delays, to Govia Thameslink Railway on 23 May 2014. On 14 September 2014, GTR took over operations from the previous franchisee First Capital Connect; during July 2015, both Southern and Gatwick Express operations were integrated into GTR. This change made it the largest rail franchise in terms of passengers, staff and fleet in the UK. The franchise has an unusual structure involving a management contract that sees all fare revenues going straight to the Department for Transport (DfT), which in turn pays GTR fixed amounts that add up to £8.9 billion across its first seven years of operation.

GTR introduced several fleets of new trains, including the Class 387, Class 700, and Class 717. In terms of infrastructure, Govia planned to invest £50 million into the 239 stations it manages to improve accessibility, replace information systems, and increase staffing hours, alongside general redevelopment work. Various measures at increasing capacity and improving service were also planned, such as the doubling of overnight Thameslink services, half-hourly King's Lynn to London services, and extending the Oyster card network.

As early as June 2016, GTR was facing public criticism from officials over its performance, including calls from the Mayor of London Sadiq Khan for it to be stripped of the franchise. In May 2018, the company introduced a new timetable which included the first regular services through the Canal Tunnels and to other new destinations previously not served by Thameslink; however, an interim timetable that ran fewer trains had to be adopted due to frequent service issues. In response to the significant decline of passenger travel amid the COVID-19 pandemic, GTR considerably curtailed its services by mid-2020. GTR is one of several train operators that experienced severe disruption of services due to the 2022–2024 United Kingdom railway strikes.

GTR was succeeded by Greater Thameslink Railway on 31 May 2026.

== History ==
=== Background ===
During 2006, the Thameslink and Great Northern services were merged into a single franchise due to the upcoming Thameslink Programme. In 2012, the British government announced that services of First Capital Connect, Southern (with Gatwick Express) and some Southeastern routes would be merged into a single Thameslink, Southern and Great Northern franchise (TSGN). The Invitation to Tender was to have been issued in October 2012, with the successful bidder announced during Spring 2013 and TSGN originally due to start in September 2013. However, following the collapse of the InterCity West Coast re-franchising process, it was decided to enact a temporary freeze on all franchising competitions until January 2013.

In January 2013, the government announced that it would extend the existing contract through to March 2014, and that it intended to negotiate with FirstGroup to operate the franchise under a management contract for up to two years. In March 2013, the Secretary of State for Transport announced that the franchise would be extended again to run up to 13 September 2014, and that the future franchise would be a management-style contract due to the level of investment and change on the route. During September 2013, a revised invitation to tender was issued. On 23 May 2014, it was announced that Govia Thameslink Railway had been awarded the franchise.

On 14 September 2014, Govia Thameslink Railway (GTR) took over services from First Capital Connect; at the commencement of operations, it served 122 stations and operated a fleet of 226 trains. The separate Thameslink and Great Northern brands were maintained upon the GTR takeover. During December 2014, full control was taken of the Sevenoaks Thameslink service, previously operated jointly with Southeastern. During July 2015, both Southern and Gatwick Express became a part of GTR, making it the largest rail franchise in terms of passengers, staff and fleet in the UK.

The franchise had an unusual structure: it was a management contract where fare income does not go to GTR. Under their original contract, the Department for Transport pays GTR £8.9 billion over the first seven-year period and receives all revenue. Consequently, the company carries less revenue risk. This form of franchise was chosen because of long-term engineering works anticipated around London, which would be a significant challenge to organise within the normal form of franchise.

=== Changes and disruptions ===
During December 2015, GTR announced that the majority of its ticket prices would be frozen, and that the average fare rise for the coming year would be only 0.8%.

In June 2016, amongst criticism of the performance of its services, Go-Ahead warned of lower than anticipated profits on the franchises, leading to 18% drop in the Go-Ahead share price. Passengers had previously rated its Thameslink service as the worst in the country. Only 20% of Southern trains arrived on time in the year from April 2015 to March 2016, and there was an ongoing industrial dispute over driver-only operated trains. On 12 July 2016, after 15% of Southern services were cancelled for a period of weeks to improve service reliability, Mayor of London Sadiq Khan called for GTR to be stripped of the franchise. On 15 July 2016, citing the issues, Rail Minister Claire Perry resigned from her position.

In response to the significant decline of passenger travel amid the COVID-19 pandemic, GTR considerably curtailed its services by mid-2020. Between 30 March 2020 and 3 April 2022, Gatwick Express services were suspended.

In March 2022, following changes made due to COVID-19, the DfT gave GTR a direct-award contract expiring on 1 April 2025, with the option for the government to extend this until 1 April 2028 at the latest.

GTR was one of several train operators impacted by the 2022–2024 United Kingdom railway strikes, which were the first national rail strikes in the UK for three decades. Its workers were amongst those who voted in favour of taking industrial action due to a dispute over pay and working conditions. GTR was only capable of operating a very minimal timetable on any of the planned dates for the strikes due to the number of staff involved.

=== Return to state ownership ===
Following election of the Starmer government in 2024, all previously-franchised passenger railway services will return to state ownership. GTR's services transferred to Greater Thameslink Railway on 31 May 2026.

== Thameslink and Great Northern services ==
Govia Thameslink Railway operated Thameslink and Great Northern services since 14 September 2014. Thameslink is a 68-station main-line route running 225 km (140 miles) north to south through London from Bedford to Brighton, serving both London Gatwick Airport and London Luton Airport, with a suburban loop serving Sutton, Mitcham and Wimbledon and a suburban line via Catford and Bromley South to Sevenoaks. Great Northern is the name of the suburban rail services run on the southern end of Britain's East Coast Main Line and associated branches. Services operate to or from London King's Cross and Moorgate. Destinations include Hertford North, Welwyn Garden City, Stevenage, Peterborough, Cambridge and King's Lynn.

In May 2018, the company introduced a new timetable which included the first regular services through the Canal Tunnels and to other new destinations previously not served by Thameslink. However, due to frequent disruption of services on the whole network, Govia decided to create a new interim timetable with a reduced number of trains; this came into operation in July 2018.

=== Great Northern service pattern ===
Since the introduction of regular services through the Canal Tunnels during May 2018, many GTR services on the East Coast Main Line were rebranded from Great Northern to Thameslink. Most of these services have been extended through central London and incorporated into the Thameslink network (as per above), although as of October 2019 some services are yet to be extended. The only services to retain the Great Northern brand are those on the Northern City Line, the stopping services to/from Cambridge and Letchworth Garden City and the express services to/from Cambridge, Ely and King's Lynn, as well as Peterborough at peak times.

== Southern and Gatwick Express services ==
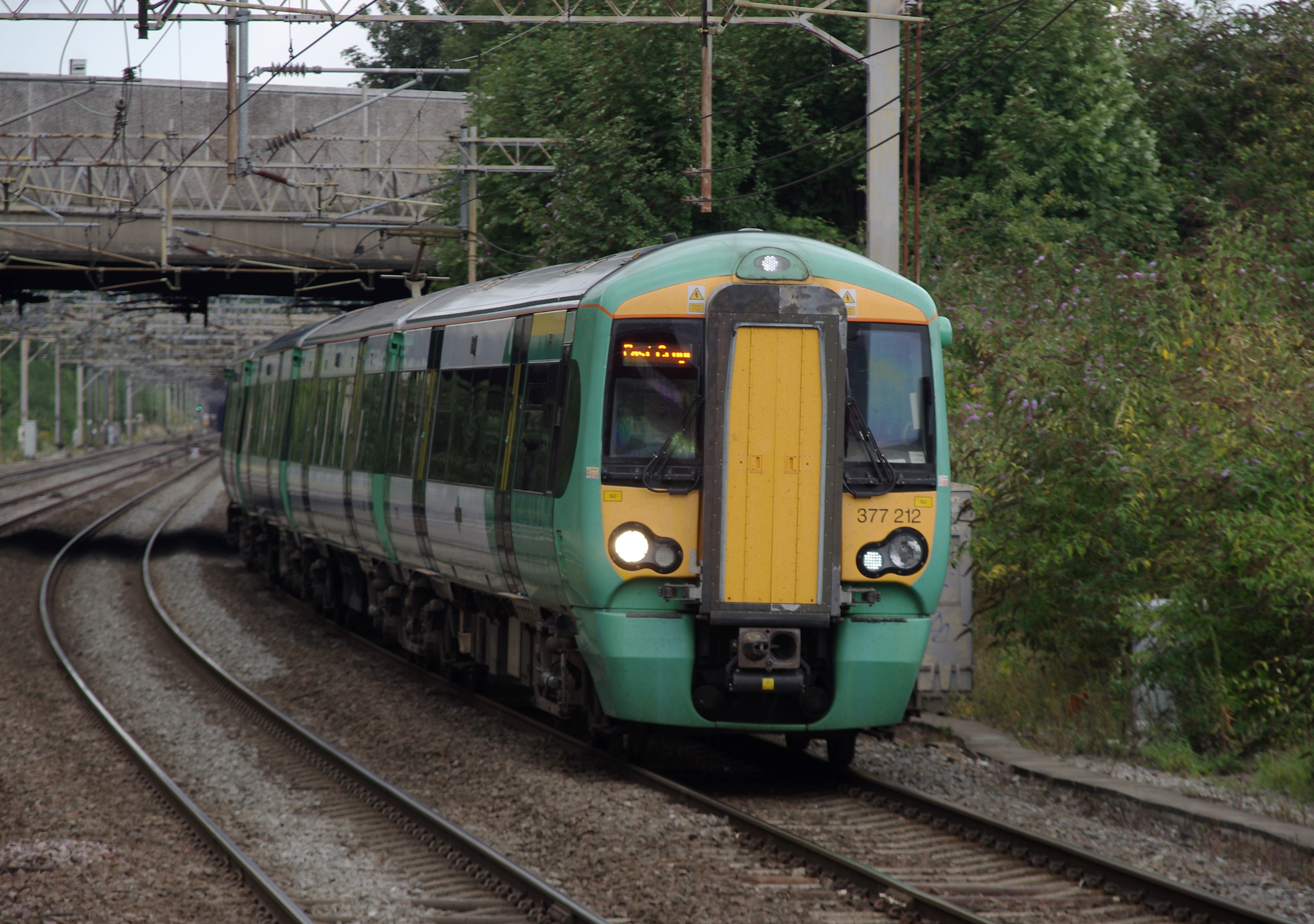
Southern Class 377 at Watford Junction

The Southern and Gatwick Express brands joined Govia Thameslink Railway on 26 July 2015. Southern routes run from London Victoria and London Bridge through the South London suburbs of Battersea, Norbury, Peckham, Sydenham, Crystal Palace, Norwood, Croydon, Streatham, Purley and Sutton to towns surrounding London including Caterham, Epsom and Tadworth. Further afield, Southern also serve Redhill, Tonbridge, Uckfield, East Grinstead, Gatwick Airport, Brighton, Ashford (Kent), Worthing, Hastings, Portsmouth, Eastbourne, Horsham, Southampton, Littlehampton and Bognor Regis. Additionally, Southern run West London route services from Watford to East Croydon via Clapham Junction. Between 2008 and 2015, Southern operated the Gatwick Express service from London Victoria to Gatwick Airport and Brighton, until it became part of Govia Thameslink Railway.

== Franchise commitments ==
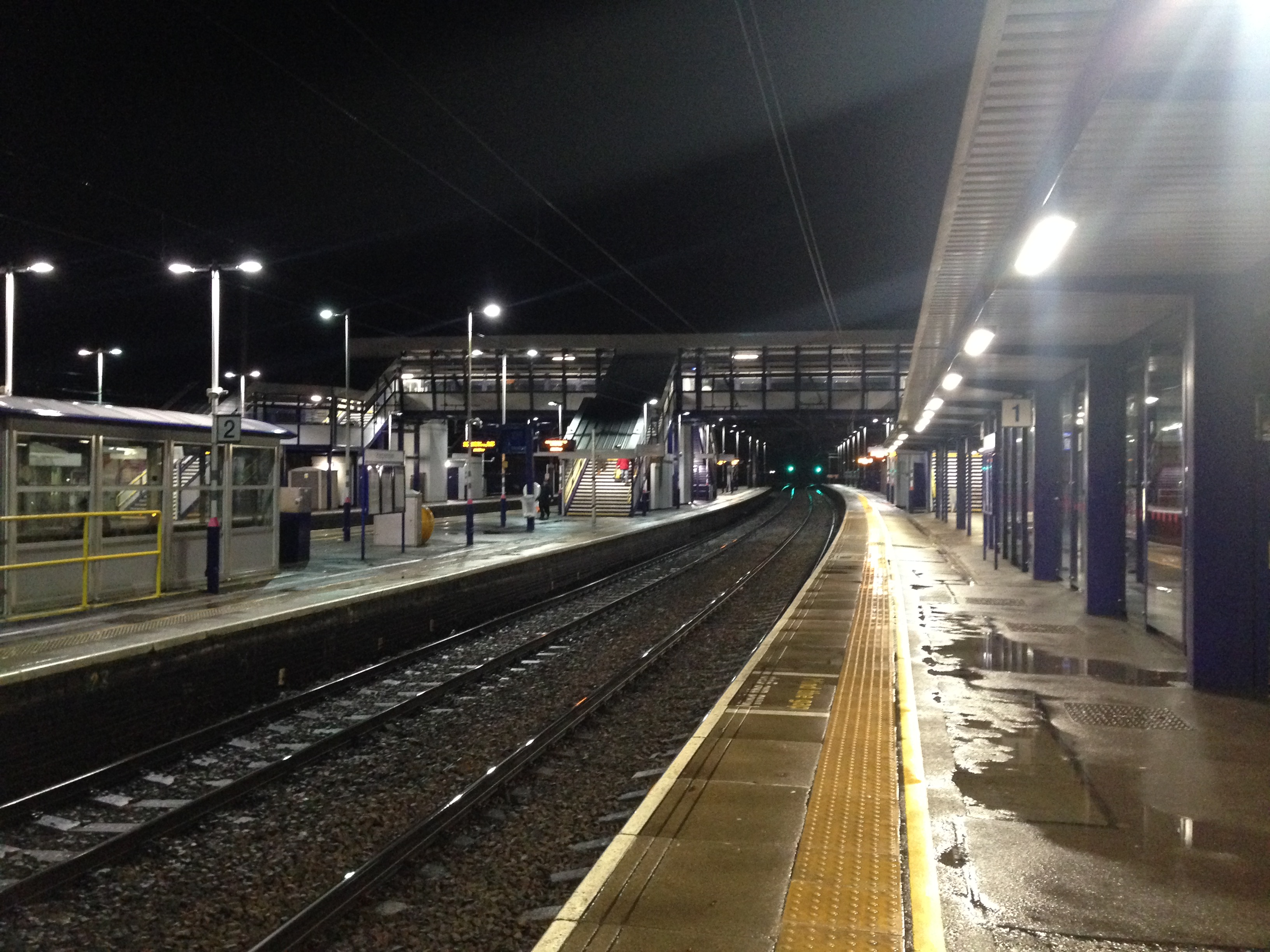
An example of widescale upgrade works at Harpenden station including the extension of platforms for 12 carriage trains, a new footbridge with lifts, new waiting rooms, brighter lighting, new ticket gates and automatic passenger information screens

This franchise is different from many other franchises let since the start of railway privatisation in 1996. Under the agreed terms of the franchise, the operator, in this case Govia, gives all revenue to the government, rather than paying set premiums. The Department for Transport will pay Govia, totalling around £8.9 billion over the franchise period of seven years, from the expected revenues of £12.4 billion. From these payments, Govia expects to generate a 3% profit, and the risks on operating costs will be Govia's, while the DfT will profit or lose from fluctuations in revenue.

Prior to the start of the franchise, Govia stated its plans to invest £50 million in all 239 stations that it would manage. The specifics of these plans include:

- Enhance all 239 stations including improving access, replace electronic information screens and working with local authorities on the redevelopment of St Albans and Luton stations.
- Increase staffing hours at many stations, with the 100 busiest stations staffed from first to last train, like London Overground stations.
- Extension of 'the key' smartcard which Southern has been introducing.
- Provide 104 stations with free Wi-Fi.
- £1.5 million on station access improvements including increased cycle storage and electrical vehicle charging points.

Govia also stated its intention to bring about the following:

- Half-hourly King's Lynn to London services
- Direct Peterborough, Cambridge, Welwyn Garden City and Finsbury Park to Tattenham Corner, Caterham, Horsham services.
- Increasing Great Northern suburban services to four trains per hour via Enfield Chase and New Barnet
- Great Northern suburban services to run to Moorgate at weekends and on weekday evenings
- 50% increase in capacity from Uckfield to London in the peaks.
- Doubling overnight Thameslink services
- Sevenoaks Thameslink services to run on Saturdays
- Working to extend Oyster to Epsom, Gatwick Airport, Luton Airport Parkway, Welwyn Garden City and Hertford North
- Class 387 Electrostars for King's Lynn express services, releasing Class 317s, 321s and some Class 365s for newly electrified routes elsewhere.
- Creating an alliance arrangement with Network Rail in 2016, like South West Trains.

== Rolling stock ==
In order to replace the Class 319 trains and to operate the expanded Thameslink network, a fleet of 115 eight- and twelve-car Class 700 trains had been procured during the franchise term of First Capital Connect. These entered service between 2016 and 2019.

As a consequence of the delayed procurement of the Class 700 trains, 29 Class 387 trains had also been ordered for the Thameslink route to release the Class 319 trains to newly electrified routes. Deliveries were completed during 2014 and the trains entered service later that year. It was originally planned that once the Class 700s began entering service, the Class 387s would be transferred to Great Western Railway for use on routes in the Thames Valley. However, a change of plans saw GWR order an entirely new fleet of Class 387s, so the Thameslink units were instead cascaded to the Great Northern route following delivery of the Class 700s.

In addition to these, GTR ordered 25 new six-car trains to replace 40-year-old Class 313 units, which were being run on the Great Northern suburban services out of Moorgate. During December 2015, Siemens was selected to provide these as a follow-on to the Class 700 order. They were designated as the Class 717 in June 2016, and were first introduced in September 2018.

In September 2022, 3 Class 171 trains were transferred to East Midlands Railway with the remaining trains reconfigured into 2 and 3 car formations.

In April 2023, GTR issued a tender for between 21 and 30 new trains to provide additional capacity for their Great Northern route. In March 2024, it was announced that Great Northern would lease all 30 Class 379s previously used by Greater Anglia. The trains were accepted for service in November 2024 and entered service on 10 February 2025.

In May 2023 the Southern Class 313 units were withdrawn from service.

In November 2024, Southeastern announced that 13 Class 377 units would be transferred from Southern. The first two units will transfer before the December 2024 timetable change with the remaining units expected to transfer before December 2025.

Govia Thameslink Railway issued a tender in April 2023 for between 21 and 30 four-coach 100 mph (160 km/h) trains, with an estimated value of £48.6 million. On 12 March 2024 it was announced that Great Northern would lease the full 30-unit fleet of Class 379 units. The units entered service on 10 February 2025.

=== Final fleet ===
At the time its contract ended in May 2026, Govia Thameslink Railway operated the following rolling stock:

Family	Class	Image	Type	Top speed		Number	Carriages	Routes operated	Built
Family	Class	Image	Type	mph	km/h	Number	Carriages	Routes operated	Built
Southern
Bombardier Turbostar	171		DMU	100	160	13	3	London Bridge to Uckfield; Eastbourne to Ashford International	2003–04
Bombardier Turbostar	171		DMU	100	160	4	2	London Bridge to Uckfield; Eastbourne to Ashford International	2003–04
Bombardier Electrostar	377/1		EMU	100	160	55	4	Entire Southern network apart from sections between Hurst Green and Uckfield & between Ore and Ashford International	2001–14
Bombardier Electrostar	377/2		EMU	100	160	15	4	Entire Southern network apart from sections between Hurst Green and Uckfield & between Ore and Ashford International	2001–14
Bombardier Electrostar	377/3		EMU	100	160	28	3	Entire Southern network apart from sections between Hurst Green and Uckfield & between Ore and Ashford International	2001–14
Bombardier Electrostar	377/4		EMU	100	160	75	4	Entire Southern network apart from sections between Hurst Green and Uckfield & between Ore and Ashford International	2001–14
Bombardier Electrostar	377/6		EMU	100	160	26	5	Entire Southern network apart from sections between Hurst Green and Uckfield & between Ore and Ashford International	2001–14
Bombardier Electrostar	377/7		EMU	100	160	8	5	Entire Southern network apart from sections between Hurst Green and Uckfield & between Ore and Ashford International	2001–14
Bombardier Electrostar	387/1; 387/2; 387/3		EMU	110	177	46 (Shared with Gatwick Express)	4	London Victoria to Eastbourne/Ore; Brighton to Eastbourne/Ore; Brighton to Southampton Central	2016–17
Gatwick Express
Bombardier Electrostar	387		EMU	110	177	18	4	London Victoria to Brighton	2015–2016
Great Northern
Bombardier Electrostar	379		EMU	100	160	30	4	London King's Cross to Ely/King's Lynn; London King's Cross to Letchworth Garden City/Cambridge	2010–2011
Bombardier Electrostar	387		EMU	110	177	12	4	London King's Cross to Ely/King's Lynn; London King's Cross to Letchworth Garden City/Cambridge	2014–2017
Siemens Desiro	717 Desiro City		EMU	85	137	25	6	Moorgate to Welwyn Garden City; Moorgate to Stevenage via Hertford North	2018
Thameslink
Siemens Desiro	700 Desiro City		EMU	100	161	60	8	Entire Thameslink network	2015–2018
Siemens Desiro	700 Desiro City		EMU	100	161	55	12	Entire Thameslink network	2015–2018

=== Past fleet ===
Former units operated by Thameslink, Southern and Great Northern include:

Class	Image	Type	Top speed		Carriages	Number	Built	Routes	Withdrawn
Class	Image	Type	mph	km/h	Carriages	Number	Built	Routes	Withdrawn
171		DMU	100	161	4	3	2003-2004	London Bridge to Uckfield; Eastbourne to Ashford International	2022
365 Networker Express		EMU	100	161	4	40	1994-95	London King's Cross to Cambridge/Ely; London King's Cross to Peterborough	2018–2021
313		EMU	75	121	3	63	1976–1977	Moorgate to Welwyn Garden City; Moorgate to Hertford North/Watton-at-Stone; Brighton/Barnham to Hove/West Worthing/Bognor Regis/Littlehampton/Portsmouth & Southsea/Portsmouth Harbour; Brighton to Lewes/Seaford	2019 (Great Northern); 2023 (Southern)
319		EMU	100	161	4	86	1987–1988; 1990	Entire Thameslink network	2015–2017
321		EMU	100	161	4	13	1989–1990	London King's Cross to Cambridge; London King's Cross to Peterborough	2016
377/5 Electrostar		EMU	100	161	4	26	2008–2009	Some Thameslink services	2017
455		EMU	75	120	4	46	1982–1984	Suburban services from London Victoria and London Bridge	2022

== Performance ==
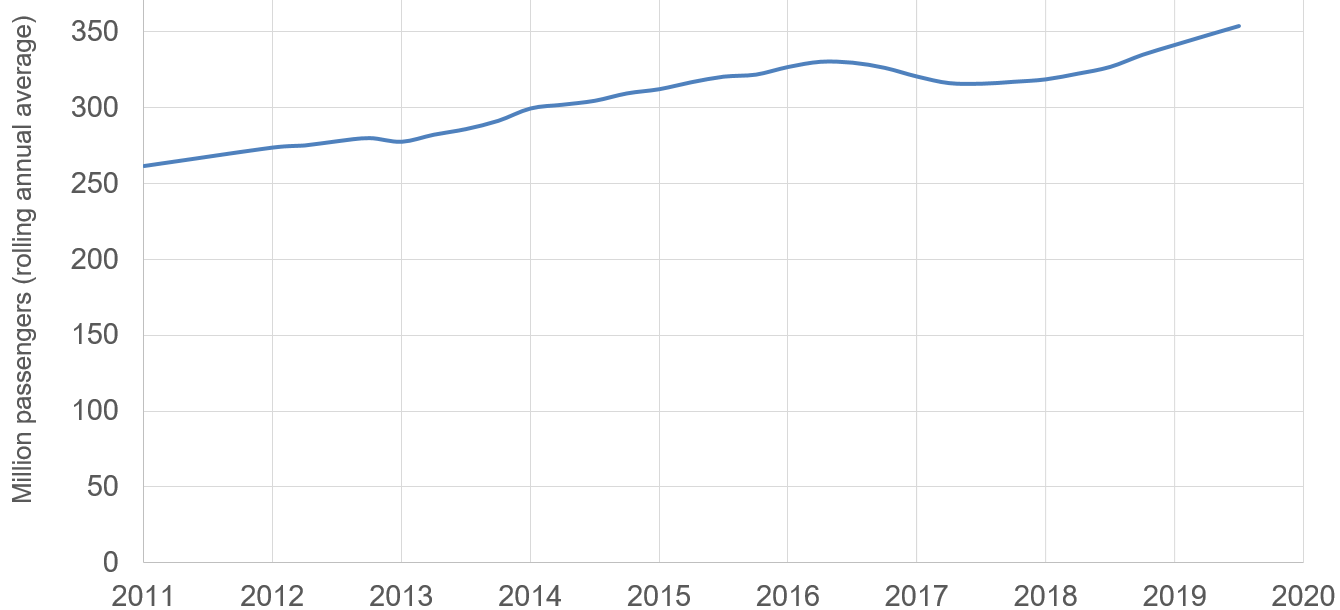
Govia and Thameslink passenger numbers 2010–11 to 2018–19 Q4, annual rolling average

In February 2015, Thameslink and Great Northern came at the bottom of Which? magazine's best and worst UK train companies customer survey, scoring a customer satisfaction score of 43%. Thameslink and Great Northern were also scored two out of five stars in each of the specific categories covered by the survey (including reliability, punctuality and cleanliness of toilets) – which is the worst performance of any UK train operator. In the Which? 2017 survey, Thameslink and Great Northern improved their performance slightly with a rating of 46% also, their position in the table was second to bottom. Southern was in bottom place, but had been subject huge disruption due to industrial action.

Passenger numbers on Govia Thameslink Railway (which also includes Southern and Gatwick Express) rose from 262 million annually in 2010–11 to 327 million annually in 2015–16.

Preceded by First Capital Connect; Thameslink and Great Northern franchise	Operator of Thameslink, Southern and Great Northern franchise 2014/2015–2026	Succeeded by Greater Thameslink Railway
Preceded by Southern; South Central (incl Gatwick Express) franchise	Operator of Thameslink, Southern and Great Northern franchise 2014/2015–2026	Succeeded by Greater Thameslink Railway
