= British Rail Class 458 =

Class of British electric multiple-unit trains

British Rail Class 458 Coradia Juniper
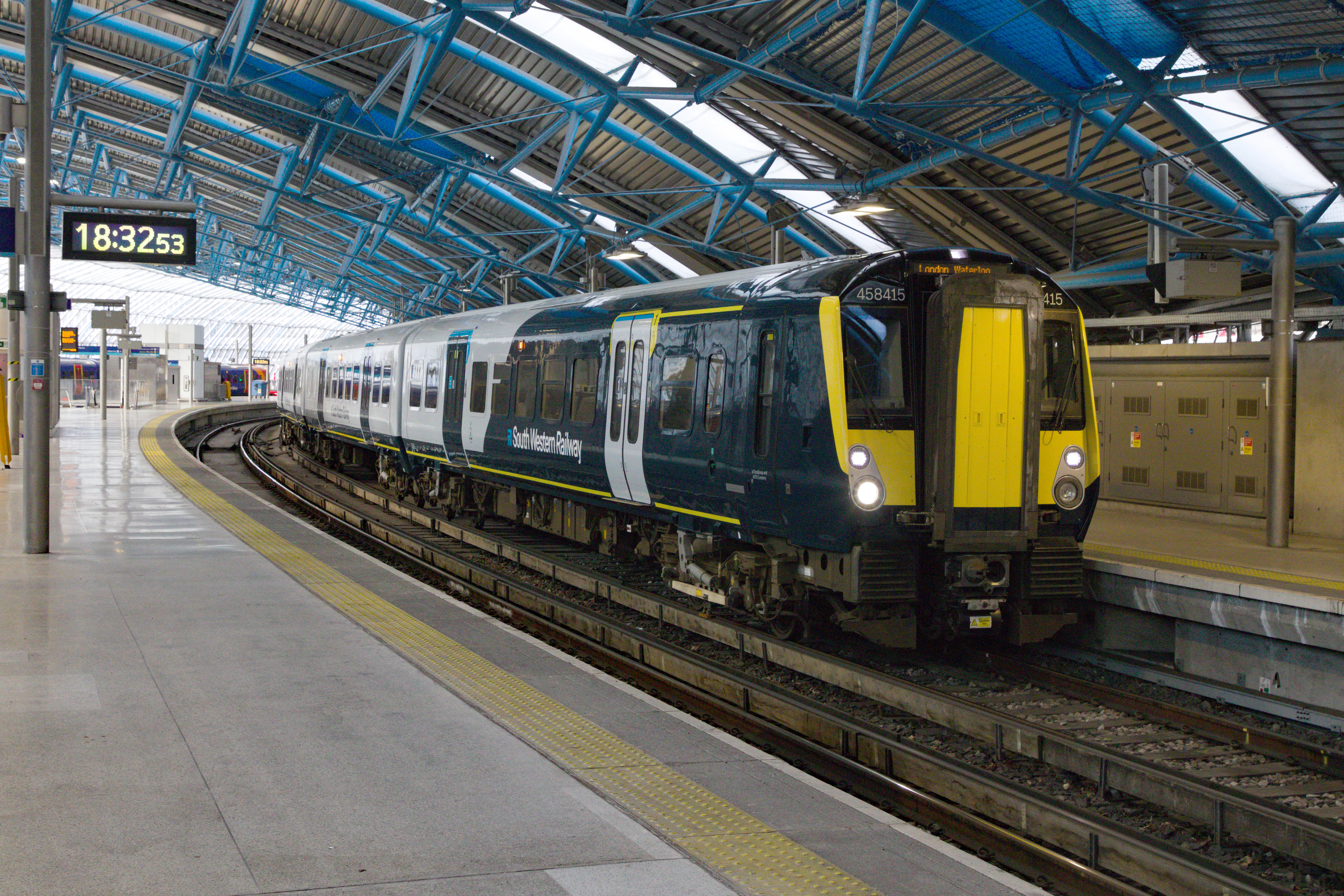
- Class 458/4 unit at London Waterloo

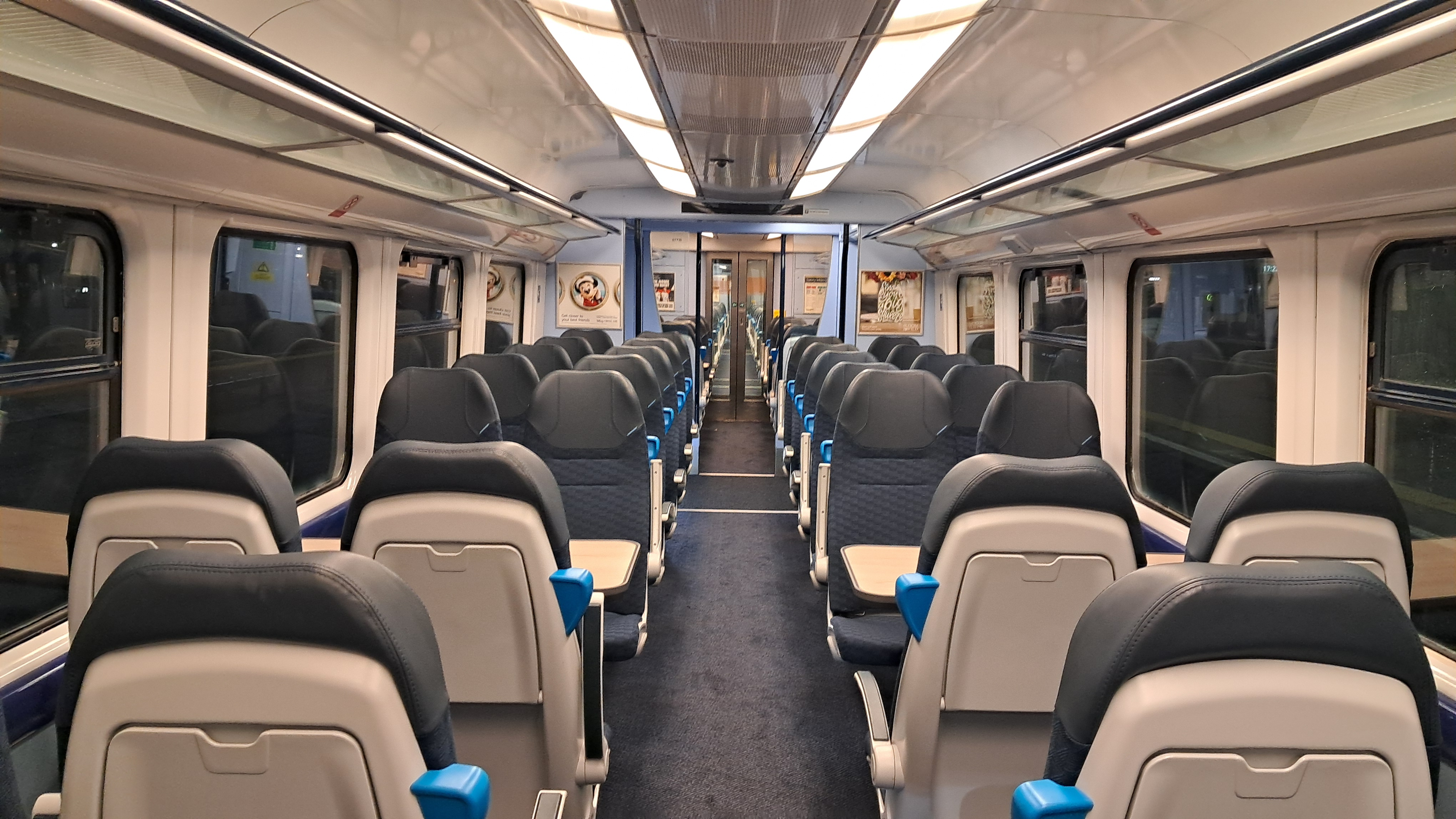
- Class 458/4 refurbished interior
- In service: 25 February 2000 – present
- Manufacturer: Alstom
- Built at: Barcelona, Spain (Note: bodyshells only); Washwood Heath, Birmingham (Note: Fitting out of trains)
- Family name: Coradia Juniper
- Replaced: Class 411; Class 412; Class 421; Class 423
- Constructed: 1998–2002
- Refurbished: 2008–2010 (interior refresh); 2013–2016 (5-car rebuild); 2022–2024 (4-car rebuild, repaint and interior refresh)
- Number built: 36 (Original fleet of 30, plus 6 converted from Cl. 460)
- Number in service: 7
- Successor: Class 701
- Formation: 4 cars per 458/0 as-built and 458/4: DMCO-TSO-MSO-DMCO; 5 cars per rebuilt 458/5 unit: DMSO-TSO-TSO-MSO-DMSO
- Design code: 4-JOP (458/0); 5-JUP (458/5)
- Fleet numbers: 458/0: 458001–458030; 458/5: 458501–458536; 458/4: 458401-458428
- Capacity: As 4-car 458/4s 234 seats; As 5-car units: 270 seats
- Owner: Porterbrook
- Operators: Current: South Western Railway; Former: South West Trains; South Western Railway (First/MTR)
- Depots: Current; Bournemouth; Former: Wimbledon (London)

Specifications
- Car body construction: Steel
- Car length: DMSO vehs.: 21.01 m (68 ft 11 in); M/TSO vehs.: 19.94 m (65 ft 5 in)
- Width: 2.80 m (9 ft 2 in)
- Height: 3.77 m (12 ft 4 in)
- Doors: Double-leaf sliding plug (2 per side per car)
- Maximum speed: 458/0 and 458/4: 100 mph (161 km/h); 458/5: 75 mph (121 km/h)
- Traction system: Alstom ONIX 800 IGBT
- Traction motors: 6 × 270 kW (400 hp) (2 per motor car)
- Power output: 1,620 kW (2,000 hp)
- Electric systems: 750 V DC third rail
- Current collection: Contact shoe
- UIC classification: 458/0: 2′Bo′+2′2′+Bo′2′+Bo′2′; 458/5: 2′Bo′+2′2′+2′2′+Bo′2′+Bo′2′
- Bogies: Alstom ACR
- Braking systems: Electro-pneumatic (disc), and regenerative
- Safety systems: AWS; TPWS
- Coupling system: 458/0: Tightlock; 458/4 and 458/5: Voith
- Multiple working: Within class
- Track gauge: 1,435 mm (4 ft 8 1/2 in) standard gauge

The British Rail Class 458 Coradia Juniper (4-JOP; later 5-JUP) is a class of electric multiple-unit passenger trains of the Alstom Coradia Juniper family, built at Washwood Heath between 1998 and 2002 for South West Trains. The order for the original fleet of 30 four-car trains was placed in 1997, and delivery of the first unit followed in October 1998. The fleet entered passenger service between 2000 and 2003 and is maintained at Bournemouth depot.

Between 2013 and 2016, the class was merged with the mechanically similar Class 460 fleet and extensively rebuilt to form a fleet of 36 five-car units—designated Class 458/5—to provide an increase in capacity on services into London Waterloo. The trains are now used by South Western Railway.

In March 2021, South Western Railway announced that 28 Class 458 units would be refurbished for use on long-distance services on the Portsmouth Direct line, as a result of the company deciding to abandon its original plan to use upgraded Class 442 units for this purpose. By 2024, this plan had been dropped, and the refurbished units were instead deployed on limited services out of London Waterloo from 24 June 2024.

== History ==
South West Trains began operating the South Western franchise in February 1996, having inherited all of its rolling stock from British Rail. While this included a small number of trains built in the late 1980s and a larger number of suburban units delivered between 1982 and 1985, a significant proportion of the overall fleet was formed by much older slam-door First Generation EMUs, such as Classes 411 and 423. In order to begin replacing these older units, SWT issued in November 1996 a request for tenders to supply 30 new air-conditioned four-car EMUs, and in 1997 together with rolling stock lessor Porterbrook awarded to Alstom a £90 million contract for their delivery.

Some railway industry commentators noted that SWT were going above and beyond the requirements of their franchise award in placing the order, and speculated that it could be a strategy to allay concerns about the fact that the same company—Stagecoach Group—owned both South West Trains and Porterbrook. This represented a potential conflict of interest at a time when rolling stock leasing companies, and Porterbrook in particular, were being criticised for extracting significant profits from leasing cheaply-acquired ex-BR stock.

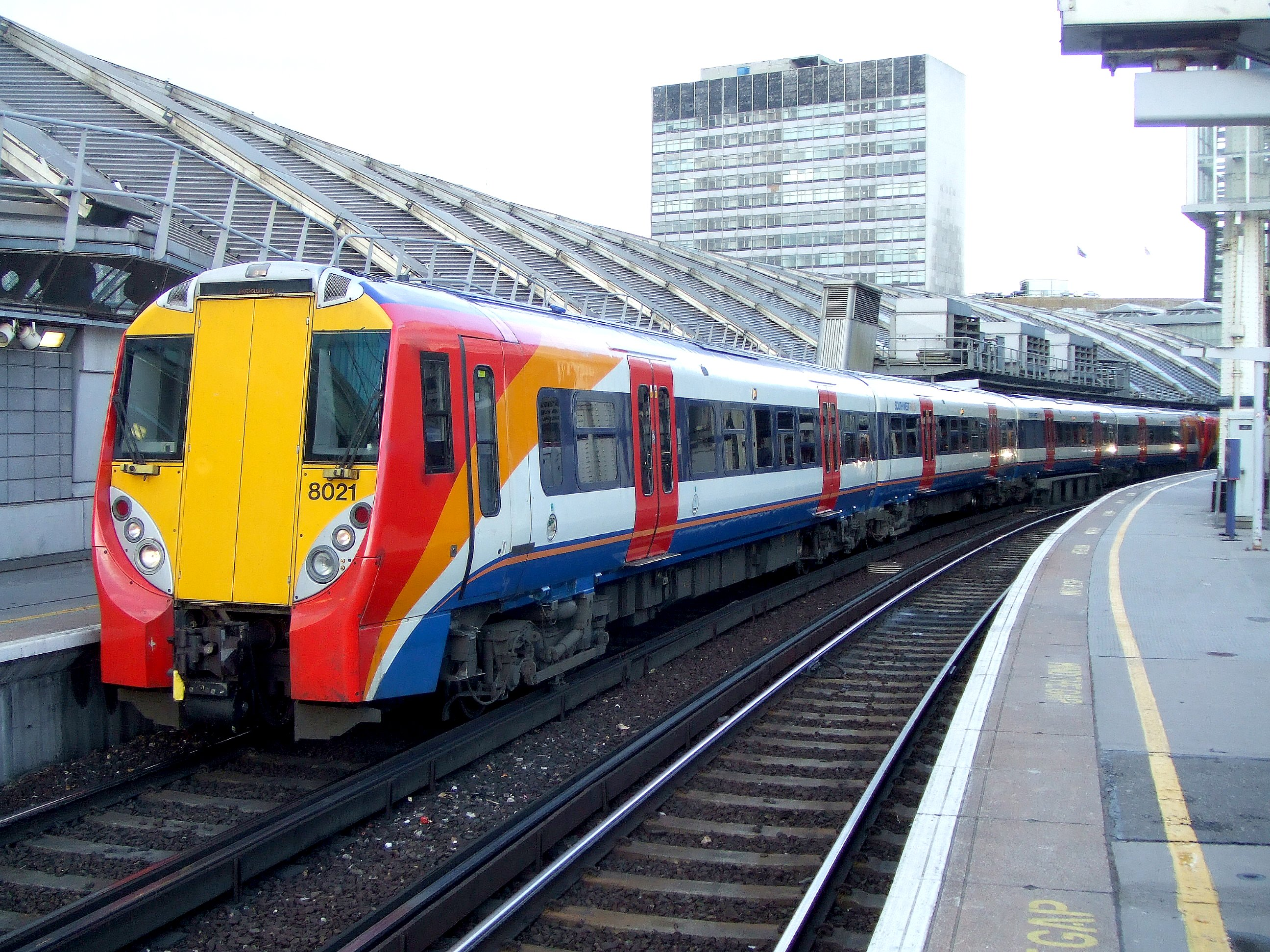
A Class 458/0 unit in as-delivered condition, showing the original driver's cab and SWT livery

All 30 units, numbered 458001–458030, were fitted out at the former Metro-Cammell works at Washwood Heath in Birmingham, which Alstom had acquired in 1989, with the bodyshells being built in Barcelona, Spain. Each unit was formed of two motor cars with driver's cabs, an intermediate trailer car, and an intermediate motor car. Both driving cars had small sections of first-class seating, while the intermediate cars were all standard class. The trailer car was provided with a pantograph well and space for an alternating-current transformer, enabling conversion to 25 kV 50 Hz AC overhead-line operation if required at a later date. One bogie on each motor car was fitted with traction motors, for a total of 6 motors along the train, a maximum speed of 100 miles per hour (160 km/h), and a cumulative power output of 1,620 kW (2,000 hp). Both driving cars were also provided with end gangways, with the intent of allowing passengers and crew to move between coupled units. They are the only members of the Coradia Juniper family to have such provision.

The first unit, 458001, was delivered to SWT for pre-acceptance testing on 31 October 1998. Attempts to place the new class into passenger service were beset by delays and major technical problems. The roofs of the new trains leaked, allowing water ingress to both the driver's cabs and passenger saloons. Onboard electronics repeatedly failed, affecting the air-conditioning and traction systems, and the Train Management System (TMS) software also proved to be unreliable. More problems were encountered in coupling process and the design of the end gangways – existing practice with ex-BR stock taught that units could be coupled or uncoupled in the space of just a few minutes, but the Coradia Juniper gangway design was significantly more complex and took far longer to operate. Additionally, the entire TMS had to be restarted whenever units were coupled and uncoupled, which meant that the total time taken to couple or uncouple Class 458 units could reach up to 30 minutes. Both of these facts in particular remained considerable limitations on the use of the new fleet; ultimately SWT had no choice but to treat the Coradia Junipers as being semi-permanently coupled in pairs. The first Class 458 passenger service eventually ran on 25 February 2000, but even then only two units (458004 and 458005) were available for use.

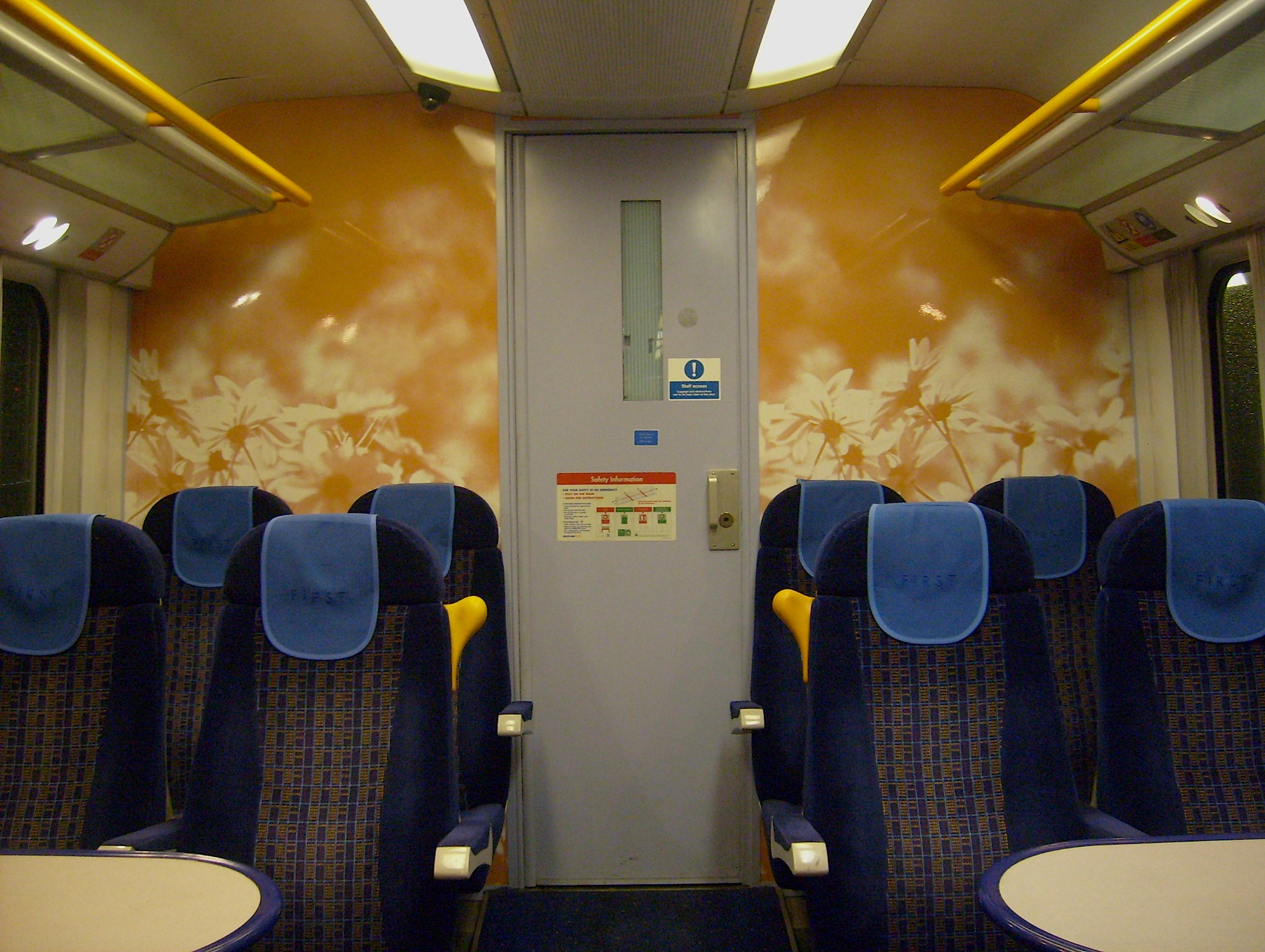
The original first-class interior of a Class 458/0 unit

By March 2002 twenty-four of the thirty units had been delivered, but on an average day only nine to ten units were actually available for service. The last six units eventually arrived by October 2002, but it was another seven months—May 2003—before the entire fleet had entered service. The protracted and difficult introduction of the Coradia Juniper fleet is credited with influencing SWT's decision in April 2001 to replace the rest of its slam-door units with an order of 785 vehicles from the competing Siemens Desiro family.

=== Withdrawal from service (2004) ===
Even after the full complement of units had entered service, reliability remained so poor that in January 2004 South West Trains announced that they would withdraw the entire Class 458 fleet at the December 2005 timetable change in readiness to return them to lessor Porterbrook when the lease on the fleet expired in February 2006. At the time of the announcement the trains were only managing an average of 4,300 miles (6,900 km) between major failures, whereas the new Siemens Desiro (Class 450) units—which had only entered service in October 2003—were already achieving an average of 21,000 miles (34,000 km) between faults, and the slam-door fleet had regularly managed intervals of circa 50,000 miles (80,000 km).

An additional 17 Class 450 units had been ordered to replace the Class 458 fleet, but as these new units would not be delivered for some time yet Porterbrook later agreed with SWT that the Coradia Junipers could stay in service on a pay-per-use basis past the original end of the lease. In a separate arrangement units 458001 and 458002 were transferred to Gatwick Express in September 2005 to act as a spare train for that operator, but they were returned to SWT in December 2006 without having been used.

In addition to reliability problems, continued use of the Class 458 fleet was complicated by issues surrounding compliance with the Rail Vehicle Accessibility Regulations (RVAR) 1998. The Regulations, which mandate the accessibility features that vehicle designers and operators need to provide in order to meet the requirements of the Disability Discrimination Act 1995, were in the process of being formulated at the same time as the Class 458 fleet was being designed and the finished units accordingly received temporary exemptions from compliance on a total of 10 different points. The exemption relating to the size of the internal passenger information displays expired on 31 July 2006—having already been extended from 30 September 2004—and the Department for Transport declined to provide any further extension. SWT fitted replacement displays of a compliant size to eight units for use as stand-by stock, while the remainder of the fleet was placed in storage.

=== Return to service ===
In September 2006 the Department for Transport confirmed after a competitive tender process that South West Trains had been awarded a new ten-year contract to operate the South Western franchise, starting in February 2007. As a result of the award, and in keeping with commitments made in its tender, SWT implemented a new rolling-stock plan that called for the withdrawal of its 24 Class 442 units. Class 444 and 450 units would take over the affected services, and the resulting gaps covered by re-activating the Class 458 fleet. There was some speculation from industry observers that this was made possible by Porterbrook significantly reducing the amount of money it charged SWT to lease the Coradia Junipers, given that there appeared to be no other operators interested in using the fleet.

Following the December 2006 timetable change, the stored Class 458 units began to return to service, and the Class 442 withdrawal was completed on 24 January 2007. By the end of the following February, observers reported that only four Coradia Junipers had not yet been re-activated, and that the general reliability of the fleet had improved so much that units now averaged 17,800 miles (28,600 km) between significant failures (defined as causing delays greater than five minutes).

The re-activation process included the fitting of RVAR-compliant internal displays to the entire fleet. The other points of RVAR non-compliance were covered by existing exemptions that remained valid until 31 December 2010.

==== Refresh and reliability improvements ====
Between 2008 and 2010 the fleet was 'refreshed' at Bournemouth Traincare Depot, during which process the units were fitted with CCTV, new seats and tables in first class, and modified RVAR-compliant lavatories and doorway lights. The interiors were also cleaned and repainted.

In May 2010, SWT enabled regenerative braking on two Class 458 units as part of trial testing its potential use across both the Coradia Juniper and Desiro fleets. The trials were successful and regenerative braking was enabled across all 30 Class 458 units by mid-2011.

By the end of 2012 the fleet was achieving an average distance of 106,049 miles (170,669 km) between significant failures; making it the most reliable fleet in Britain and the first to achieve 6-figure mileages. The feat was recognised with a Modern Railways magazine Golden Spanner award in the New Generation EMU category on 23 November 2012.

=== Withdrawal from service (2026) ===
On 23 April 2026 South Western Railway announced that it plans to withdraw its Class 458 fleet once enough of the Class 701 Arterio fleet had entered service.

== Conversion to Class 458/5 ==
South West Trains had experienced a considerable shortage of passenger capacity on many of its suburban routes in the years up to 2012, which it attributed primarily to the fact that passenger numbers had increased dramatically without a corresponding rise in the size of the operator's fleet. The company had suggested to the Department for Transport on at least three occasions that more Class 450 units should be purchased from Siemens, but had been turned down each time.

As an alternative, Porterbrook proposed to enlarge the Class 458 fleet and reconfigure it for suburban services by using vehicles from the Class 460 fleet, which Porterbrook also owned and which was at that time being released from service with Gatwick Express. The process, budgeted at £42 million, would allow for all 30 original Class 458 units to be extended by one vehicle, making them into five-car units, after which there would be six five-car Class 460 units left over. These would be comprehensively rebuilt to match the extended Class 458 units, for a total fleet of 36 five-car units that would be designated Class 458/5. The units of this "new" fleet would be used—either individually or in pairs of ten cars—to provide extra peak-time capacity on suburban services into Waterloo from the Hounslow, Weybridge (via Staines), and Windsor lines. A separate improvements package agreed between SWT and Network Rail provided for platform extensions necessary for ten-car operation at over 60 suburban stations, and for the re-opening of one of the four disused platforms at the former Waterloo International terminal.

The Department for Transport announced in December 2011 that it had accepted the proposal, and an agreement between Porterbrook and South West Trains was signed in January 2012. South West Trains described the project as advancing its aspiration to become a "10-car railway", and the company's fleet director noted that while the project was "much more complicated ... than buying new trains", it was also "significantly cheaper". The primary contract for delivering the project was awarded to Alstom, who appointed Wabtec to perform the conversion work on its behalf.

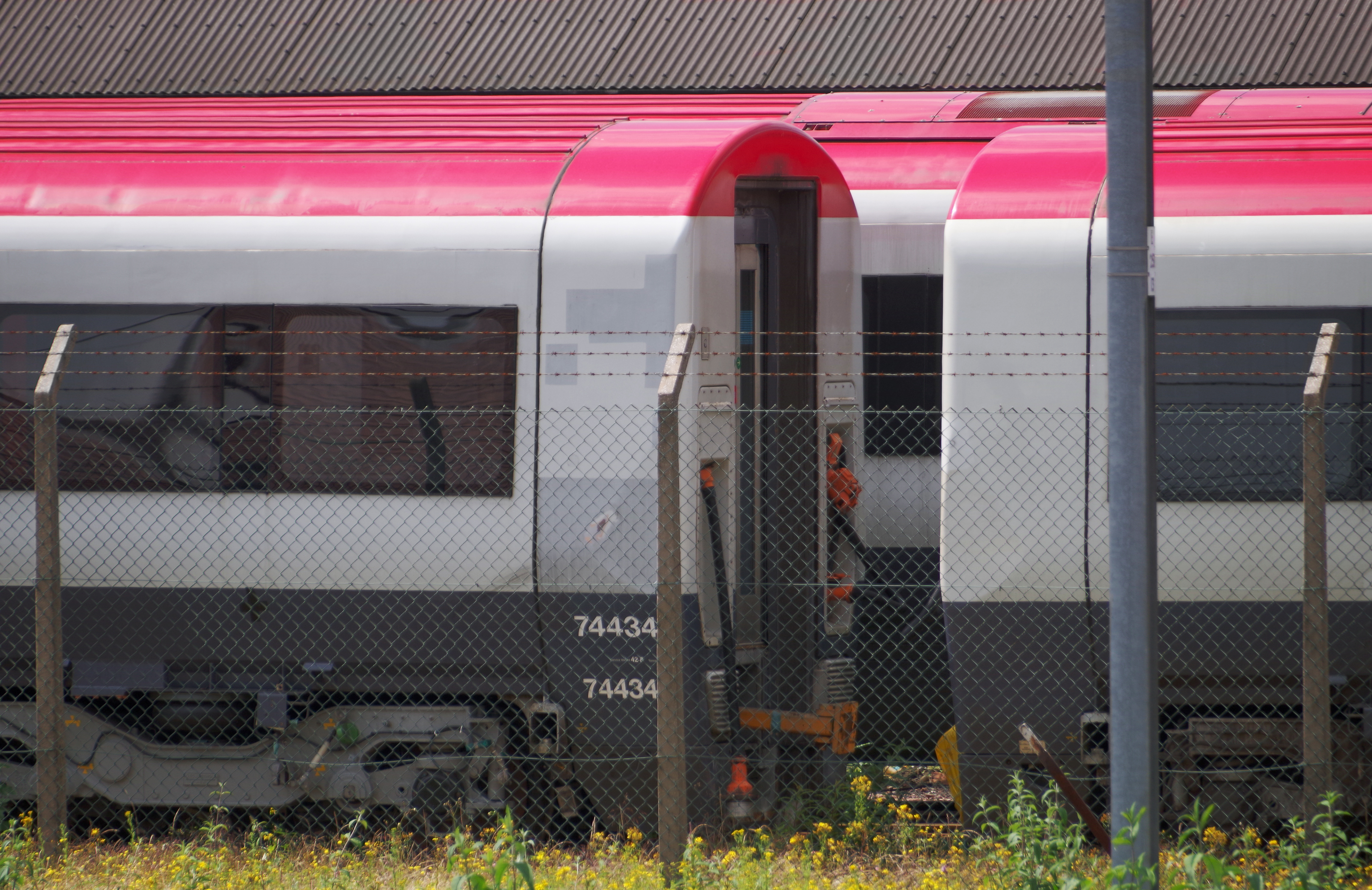
Separated Class 460 vehicles at Doncaster Works prior to being rebuilt

All 48 intermediate vehicles from the Class 460 fleet were sent to Wabtec's Doncaster Works to be rebuilt and refitted. Twelve of the 16 driving vehicles were rebuilt by Wabtec subsidiary Brush Traction at its workshops in Loughborough, where their original driver's cabs were replaced with newly fabricated versions that included gangways and Voith automatic couplers of the same types used on Class 444 and 450 units. Four of the selected driving vehicles had been built with luggage compartments, and these were removed and their roller-shutter external doors were replaced with power-operated plug doors like those used on the other vehicles. Together with 18 of the intermediate cars from the Class 460 vehicles, these became the six "new" Class 458/5 units. The remaining 30 Class 460 cars were prepared for insertion into the Class 458/0s.

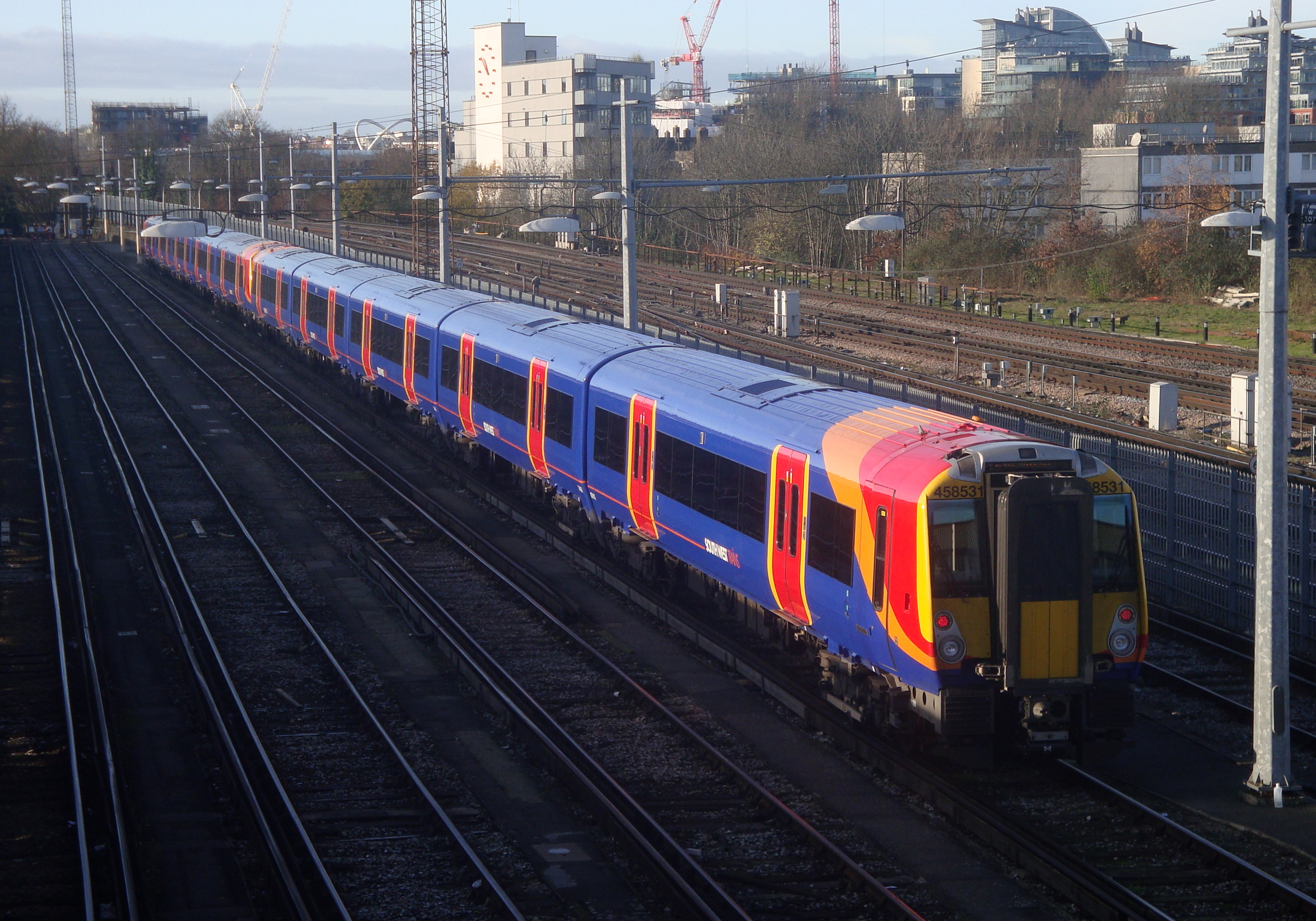
Two Class 458/5 units soon after being rebuilt. The continuous window band along the vehicle's side only appears on former Class 460 vehicles – original Class 458 vehicles have windows separated by bodywork.

Additional modifications included re-gearing the traction motors to reduce the train's maximum speed from 100 mph (161 km/h) to 75 mph (121 km/h), both to reduce the likelihood of overheating when making frequent stops and starts, and because the higher speed was unnecessary on suburban services. New Train Management System (TMS) software was developed to be compatible across the entire Class 458/5 fleet, simplifying maintenance and improving reliability. An Automatic Selective Door Opening (ASDO) system was installed for use at a small number of stations where it was impractical to lengthen platforms. The vehicle interiors were refurbished and reconfigured to provide more standing room for passengers, mainly by changing from 5- to 4-abreast seating and thus allowing a wider aisle. The units were also repainted into SWT's blue livery, matching the Class 450 fleet.

SWT expected to receive the first two Class 458/5 units in May 2013—in time for them to enter service the following November—but due to delays in production the initial delivery did not take place until October. Following testing and staff training, entry into passenger service was achieved in March 2014. Once the first four fully-converted units had been delivered and accepted for service, SWT was able to start sending original Class 458/0 units for rebuilding. These units received the same modifications as the Class 460 conversions, leaving SWT and Porterbrook with a single mechanically homogenous Class 458/5 fleet. The last unmodified original units were withdrawn from service for rebuilding in November 2015, and returned to SWT after completion on 30 March 2016.

At the conclusion of the conversion project four Class 460 vehicles—all of them driving cars with luggage compartments—were superfluous; these were stripped for spare parts and later scrapped.

== Conversion to Class 458/4 ==
The South Western franchise was transferred from South West Trains to South Western Railway (a FirstGroup/MTR joint venture) in August 2017. Prior to commencing operations, SWR had taken advantage of low finance costs to order from Bombardier Transportation a new fleet of 750 vehicles—now designated Class 701—that would replace Classes 455, 456, 458, and 707 on South Western suburban services from late 2019 onwards. However, continuing delays to the Class 701 programme kept all four older fleets in use into the 2020s.

South Western Railway had plans to use refurbished Class 442 units for long-distance services to and from London on the Portsmouth Direct line. However, in March 2021, the operator announced its decision to abandon these plans, citing continuing technical difficulties and future problems complying with accessibility regulations. To make up for the shortfall, 28 Class 458 units have been refurbished and were planned to be redeployed in their place. The refurbishment was performed by Alstom at Widnes in Cheshire at a cost of £25 million and involved returning each unit to its original four-car formation by removing the Class 460 vehicles, restoring the original maximum speed of 100 mph (161 km/h), and reconfiguration of the passenger saloons. The reconfigured units will be leased from Porterbrook until 2027 at the earliest and are maintained at Bournemouth Traction and Rolling Stock Maintenance Depot. The first two units to be sent for refurbishment, 458507 and 458517, arrived at Widnes by mid-August 2022.

Testing for the 458/4s began on 9 October 2023.

In early 2024 it was announced that the plan to use the Class 458/4s on Portsmouth services had been dropped. Later in May 2024, it was announced that the Class 458/4s would instead be used on some limited outer suburban services from London Waterloo. The first Class 458/4 entered service on 24 June 2024, with the entire converted fleet in service by May 2025.

The 458/4 conversion and refurbishment was completed on 12 December 2024. Scrapping of the redundant ex-Class 460 vehicles started in January 2025.

The 8 unconverted 458/5s were all withdrawn from service by March 2026.

== Incidents ==
- On 30 January 2015, a small explosion occurred underneath a driving vehicle of unit 458501 near Windsor & Eton Riverside station. The Rail Accident Investigation Branch determined that this was caused by a join between three underfloor power cables not being secured correctly when the unit was rebuilt in 2014.
- On 21 December 2019, unit 458519 was involved in a collision with a car between Wokingham and Bracknell. Nobody was seriously injured.

== Fleet details ==
Class	Operator	Qty.	Year built	Year converted	Cars per unit	Unit nos.	Notes
458/4	South Western Railway	7	1998–2002	2022–2024	4	458402, 458404, 458412, 458415, 458421, 458423, 458426, 458428	Converted from Class 458/5s by removing the Class 460 intermediate vehicle.
458/4	Stored	21	1998–2002	2022–2024	4	458401, 458403, 458405-458411, 458413-458414, 458416-458420, 458422, 458424-458425, 458427	Converted from Class 458/5s by removing the Class 460 intermediate vehicle.
458/5	Stored	2	1998–2002	2013–2016	5	458529-458530	Original fleet of four-car Class 458/0 units, extended to five cars by inserting a rebuilt Class 460 intermediate vehicle.
458/5	Stored	6	1998–2002	2013–2016	5	458531–458536	Converted from Class 460 units.
