= London to Brighton in Four Minutes =

1950s BBC short film

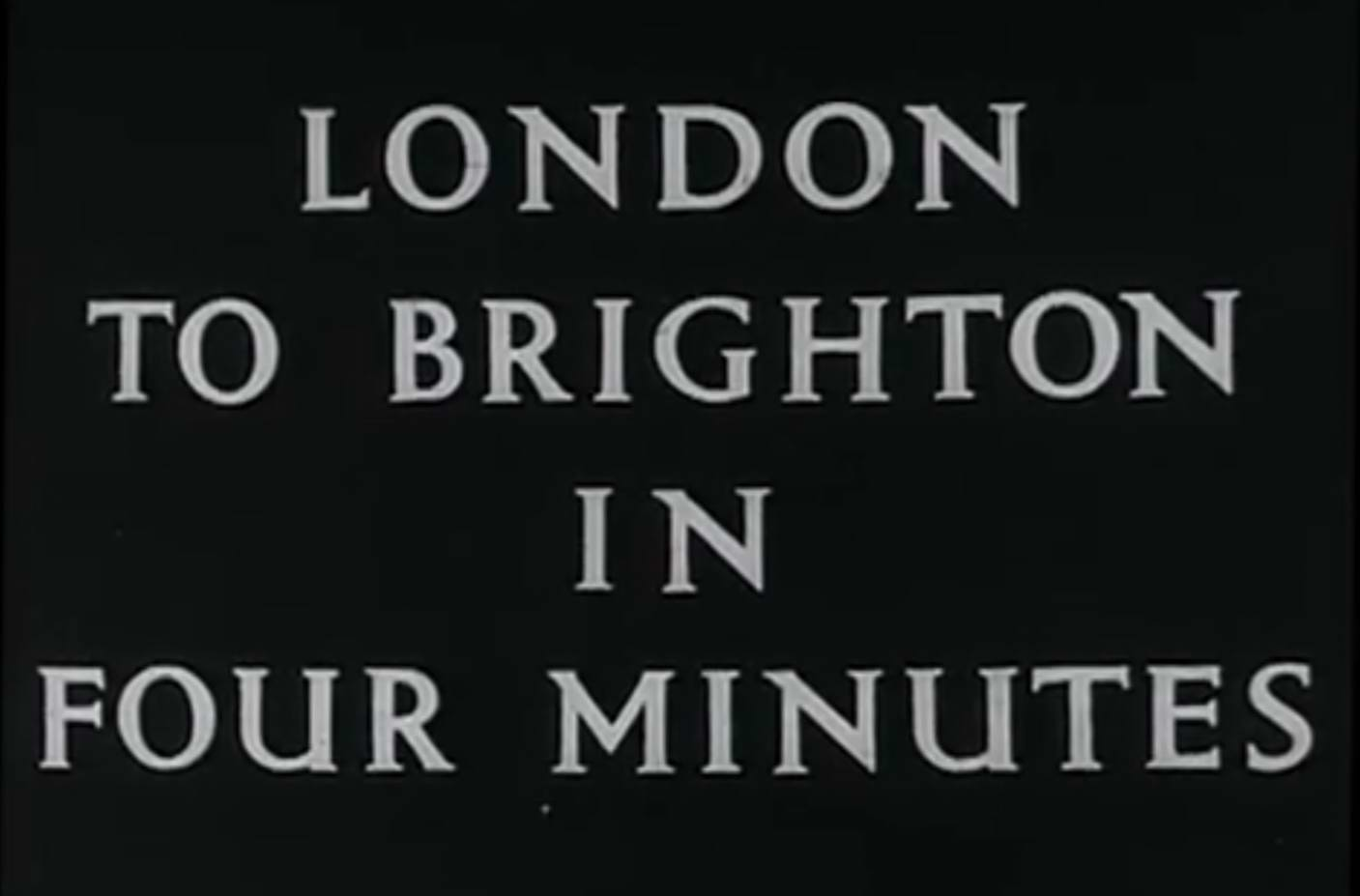
- Title card of 1953 film
- Genre: Documentary
- Directed by: Don Smith
- Narrated by: David Lloyd James
- Composers: David Hart, "Sabre Jet"

Production
- Running time: 5:24 minutes

Original release
- Network: BBC Television
- Release: 1953

London to Brighton in Four Minutes is a short film produced by the BBC Film Unit in the early 1950s showing a train journey from London Victoria to Brighton in England. The camera was manually undercranked to produce a fast motion film so that the journey lasted only four minutes instead of the actual time of about one hour.

It was originally shown on BBC Television's Children's Newsreel and over the years its frequent repeat transmissions became very popular with British television viewers of all ages. Later versions were produced, particularly in 1983 and 2013, showing some of the cultural and operational changes that had taken place. The films show the train driver's view ahead during a journey aboard the Brighton Belle.

== 1953 BBC Film Unit film ==
The BBC Film Unit's London to Brighton in Four Minutes is a short film about a London to Brighton train journey, produced in 1953. (Note: Sources differ – the BBC and the British Film Institute give 1953 whereas IMDb and some other sources give 1952.) It was mostly filmed from the driver's point of view looking straight ahead (Note: The driver was at the front of the first carriage – the train was an electric multiple unit with no separate locomotive.) with the filming done so that the journey was spectacularly fast, lasting only four minutes instead of the real travel time of about one hour. The ride was aboard the Brighton Belle, a Pullman train, along the Brighton Main Line from London Victoria to Brighton on the south coast of England.

The film was made by Don Smith and the first version was narrated by David Lloyd James for an edition of BBC Television's Children's Newsreel regular weekend programme.

Video of the film and subsequent history
- 1953: London to Brighton in Four Minutes London to Brighton Train Journey: 1953 – uploaded to YouTube by BBC South.
- 1983: London to Brighton in 3½ Minutes London to Brighton Train Journey: 1983 – uploaded to YouTube by BBC South.
- 2013:London to Brighton by Train in 3 minutes 18 seconds London to Brighton Train Journey: 2013. – uploaded to YouTube by BBC South.
- 1953–2013: London to Brighton Side by Side London to Brighton Train Journeys: 1953 - 2013 – uploaded to YouTube by BBC South. (Note: See also on BBC News.)
- 2013 BBC report: London to Brighton Train Journeys: 1953 - 2013 – uploaded to YouTube by BBC South.
- Active map and 2013 film Active map synchronised with embedded YouTube video – video content uploaded to YouTube by BBC South. (Note: The active map is similar to the display on a GPS device.)

For the most part the camera was manually undercranked at about two frames per second for fast motion display at 25 frames per second. The film's commentator described this as "trick photography" and said the train was appearing to run the 51 miles (82 km) at an average speed of 765 miles per hour (1,231 km/h). 35 mm film was used and each time a 100-foot (30 m) film magazine ran out and was replaced, normal-speed shots of the engine driver were slotted in for continuity. The soundtrack of music and background noises were recorded magnetically for over-dubbing – the sound of the train was actually that of a jet engine and clapping was used for the noises at station platforms and through bridges and tunnels. The music is "Sabre Jet" composed by David Hart. (Note: David Hart is a pseudonym of William Granville Chapman.)

Later, a version with a different commentary was made for the main Television Newsreel programme with a name change to Go Slow on the Brighton Line. Whereas the children's version only has narration at the beginning and end of the journey, in the revised version with a different narrator the names of some of the stations being passed are mentioned.

== Subsequent programmes ==
In the early years of BBC television the film was transmitted quite often as part of their normal schedule and became very well known to the television audience. As such it was a dramatic variation on the BBC's rather frequent "interludes" (such as the "Potter's Wheel") which were merely gap-fillers between programmes and which had a generally tranquil atmosphere. The BBC still shows the film on rare occasions. To show the changing conditions over two periods of thirty years the journey was also filmed in 1983 and 2013, again using time-lapse photography to show the journeys at high speed. (Note: The three films are 1953, 1983 and 2013.) In addition, a version was produced showing the three films synchronised side by side.

== Changes between 1953 and 2013 ==
In 1953 Brighton Main Line was operated by the Southern Region of British Railways, then recently nationalised. The Brighton Belle operated using electrical multiple units running on the third-rail system previously introduced by Southern Railway.

In 1958 the small station for Gatwick Racecourse was enlarged and renamed Gatwick Airport serving the rapidly expanding Gatwick Airport. The 1963 Beeching Report led to steam locomotives being withdrawn from the line and the closure of many branch lines and nearly all goods yards. The Brighton Belle named-train service was ended in 1972. In 1982 Southern Region became the London and South Eastern sector and the following year all signal boxes were replaced by three rail operating centres. The express service between Victoria and Gatwick Airport was taken over by the InterCity sector in 1984 and rebranded Gatwick Express. The privatisation of British Rail in the mid-1990s led to six different rail franchises all running on the Brighton Line; Connex South Central, Connex South Eastern, Gatwick Express, Thameslink, Thames Trains and Virgin CrossCountry.

By 2013, while freight on the Brighton Line had almost disappeared and the complexity of branch lines had diminished, passenger traffic boomed with a new town at Crawley, expanded business at Brighton and Croydon, and increased traffic at Gatwick Airport. The 1988 Thameslink project opened the way for through trains to run between Brighton and Bedford, north of London – this route does not go to Victoria but branches off to cross the River Thames at Blackfriars Railway Bridge and reaches north of London via the reopened Snow Hill tunnel.

BBC South Today produced news reports in 2013 describing the changes on the journey between 1953 and 2013. Because of heavier traffic there were no longer any non-stop journeys between the two stations so the 2013 film had to be filmed on a special train running early on a Sunday morning. All the same, the fastest scheduled journey time had been reduced from 60 minutes to 47 minutes with the maximum train speed being increased from 75 miles per hour (121 km/h) to 90 miles per hour (140 km/h). Ticket inspectors had been replaced by automatic barriers and by 2013 the railway staff were no longer nearly all men. (Note: The 2013 reports variously say "In 1953 almost all rail workers were men. Today, the train dispatcher is a woman." and "In 1953 every railway worker was male. Today, many of the platform staff are women." Comment: in 2018 16% of the UK's Network Rail staff were women, and in 2019 5% of train drivers were women.) In 1953 there were still steam trains running on the line although the Brighton Belle itself was electric. The number of railway branch lines had been reduced so there were fewer points and sidings but the number of trains had doubled and there were more than twice as many passengers. The railway line and train operators had both been privatised and the trains had become air-conditioned. In 1953 the return fare was 15/- (75 pence), that is to say £18.75 by 2013 allowing for inflation, while in 2013 the fare was actually £28.80 ($45.02 in 2013).

== Route taken ==
The Brighton Main Line runs from London Victoria and terminates at Brighton. An animated map of the route, synchronised with the 2013 film of the journey has been produced on an external website using innovative software. A map showing the position of the train as it travels is displayed along with the film of the 2013 journey.

Selected locations on route

Video times in minutes and seconds at selected locations
Location	Animated map with 2013 time	1953, 1983, 2013 side-by-side time	Distance
Victoria station	0:17	0:29	0 miles 0 chains (0 km) (Note: 8 chains subtracted because the buffer stops at Victoria are not the zero point)
Victoria Railway Bridge (River Thames)	0:20	0:34	0 miles 57 chains (1.1 km)
Battersea Park	0:23	0:36	1 mile 15 chains (1.9 km)
Clapham Junction	0:31	0:45	2 miles 49 chains (4.2 km)
Balham	0:39	0:52	4 miles 44 chains (7.3 km)
Norbury	0:49	1:02	7 miles 28 chains (11.8 km)
East Croydon	1:02	1:16	10 miles 30 chains (16.7 km) (Note: 10 chains added to account for the difference between Victoria and London Bridge mileages)
Quarry Tunnel; M23/M25	1:33	1:46	18 miles 42 chains (29.8 km)
Redhill Tunnel	1:42	1:54	21 miles 74 chains (35.3 km)
Gatwick Airport	1:58	2:11	26 miles 55 chains (42.9 km) (Note: 6 chains added to account for the difference between Quarry and Redhill routes)
Three Bridges	2:06	2:19	29 miles 29 chains (47.3 km)
M23	2:12	2:25	31 miles 2 chains (49.9 km)
Balcombe tunnel	2:16	2:30	32 miles 62 chains (52.7 km)
Ouse Valley Viaduct	2:29	2:42	35 miles 67 chains (57.7 km)
Haywards Heath	2:38	2:52	37 miles 67 chains (60.9 km)
Haywards Heath Tunnel	2:40	2:53	38 miles 25 chains (61.7 km)
Burgess Hill	2:54	3:07	41 miles 47 chains (66.9 km)
Hassocks	3:02	3:16	43 miles 50 chains (70.2 km)
Clayton Tunnel/A23	3:07	3:22	45 miles 74 chains (73.9 km)
Patcham Tunnel/A27	3:22	3:36	47 miles 73 chains (77.1 km)
Brighton railway station	3:35	3:48	50 miles 57 chains (81.6 km)

== See also ==
- London to Brighton Veteran Car Run – rally for cars built before 1905
- Germany's Most Beautiful Railways – real-time, drivers view, German fill-in television series
