= Brighton railway station =

Railway station in East Sussex, England

Brighton
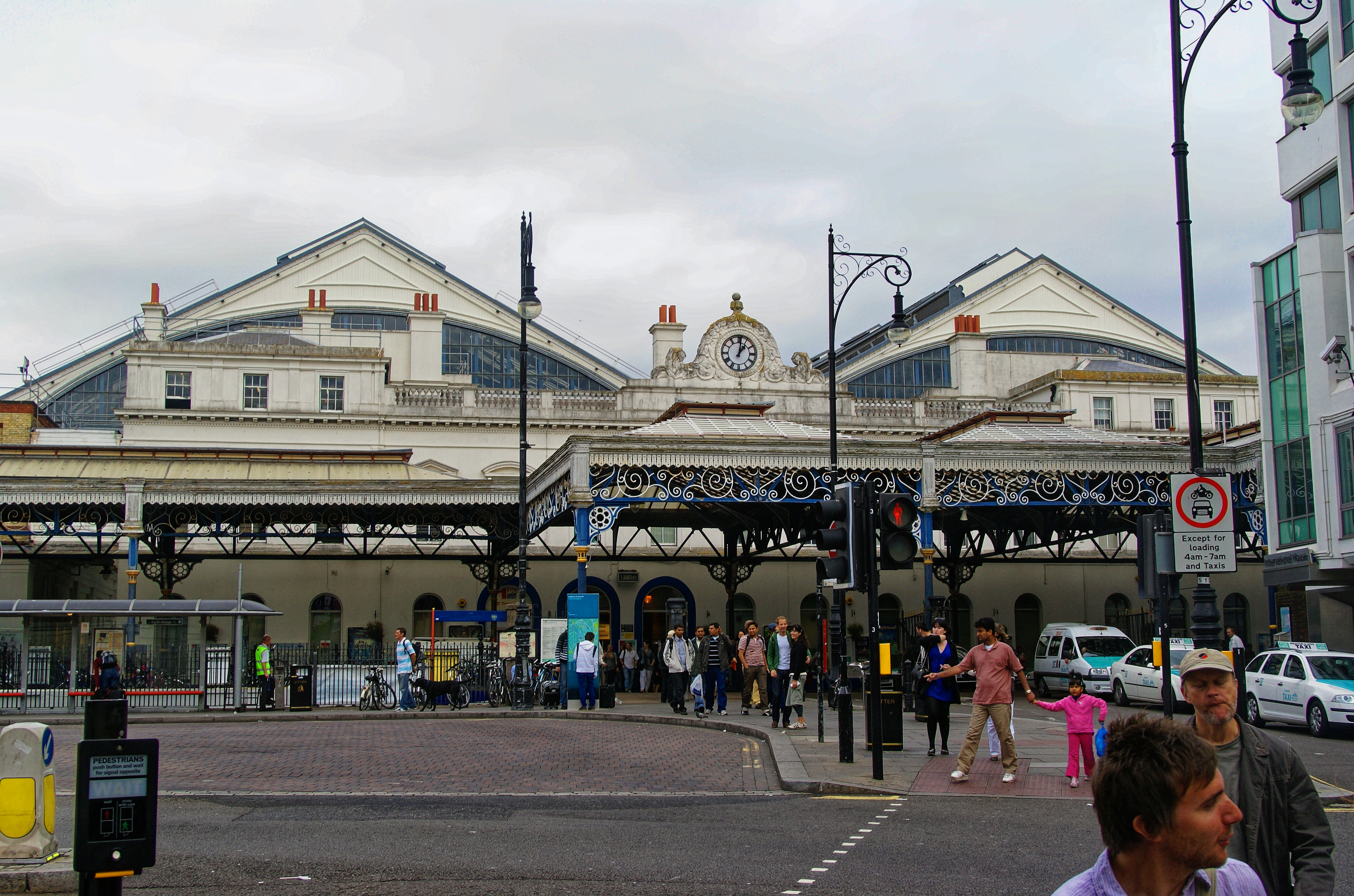
- The station's exterior

General information
- Location: Brighton, Brighton and Hove, England
- Coordinates: 50.8288°N 0.1411°W
- Grid reference: TQ310049
- Owner: Network Rail
- Manager: Greater Thameslink Railway
- Platforms: 8

Other information
- Station code: BTN
- Classification: DfT category B

History
- Opened: 11 May 1840

Passengers
- 2020/21: ▼4.149 million
- Interchange: ▼0.367 million
- 2021/22: ▲11.228 million
- Interchange: ▲0.926 million
- 2022/23: ▲14.053 million
- Interchange: ▼0.893 million
- 2023/24: ▲14.548 million
- Interchange: ▲0.981 million
- 2024/25: ▲15.328 million
- Interchange: ▲1.298 million

Listed Building – Grade II*
- Feature: Brighton station, including train sheds
- Designated: 30 April 1973 (amended 26 August 1999)
- Reference no.: 1380797
Location
Notes
- Passenger statistics from the Office of Rail and Road

Brighton is the principal railway station serving the city of Brighton and Hove, in East Sussex, England. It is the southern terminus of the Brighton Main Line, the western terminus of the East Coastway line and the eastern terminus of the West Coastway line. It lies 50 miles 49 chains (50.61 miles, 81.45 km) from London Bridge, via Redhill. The station is operated by Greater Thameslink Railway, which operates services under the Thameslink, Gatwick Express, and Southern brands.

With 14.5 million passenger entries and exits in 2023-24, Brighton is the busiest station in East Sussex, the second busiest in South East England and the seventh-busiest station in the country outside London.

== History ==
The London & Brighton Railway (L&BR) built a passenger station, goods station, locomotive depot and railway works on a difficult site on the northern edge of Brighton in 1840–41. This site was 0.5 miles (0.8 km) from, and 70 feet (21 m) above, the sea shore and had involved considerable excavation work to create a reasonable gradient from Patcham Tunnel.

The station initially only connected Brighton with Shoreham-by-Sea, westwards along the coast, in May 1840. In September 1841, it was extended inland to Haywards Heath and London Bridge, via the new Clayton Tunnel; then to the county town of Lewes to the east via the London Road Viaduct in 1846. The railway became the London, Brighton & South Coast Railway in 1846, following mergers with other railways with lines between Portsmouth and Hastings.

=== Passenger station ===
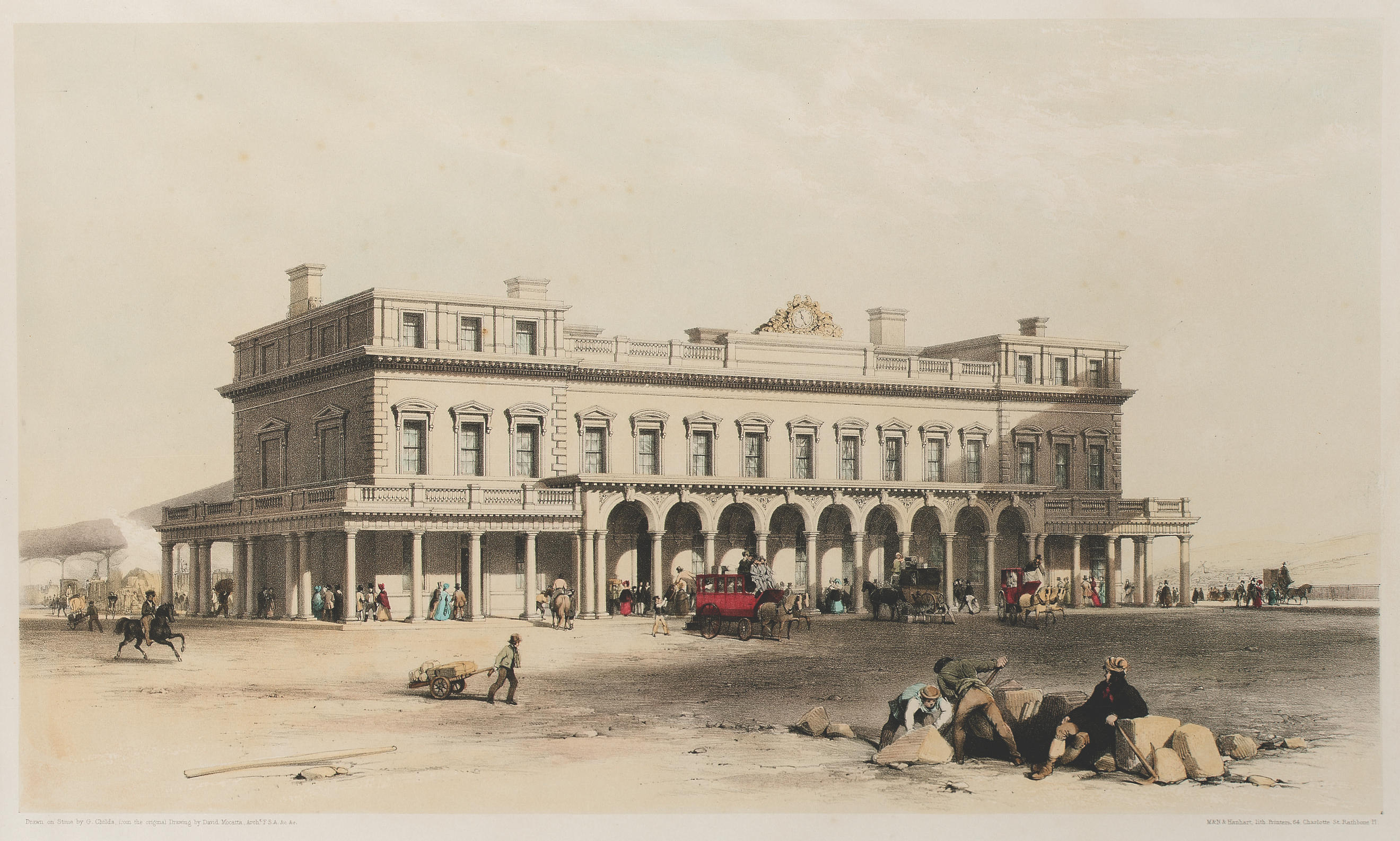
Brighton station, 1841

The passenger station was a three-storey building in an Italianate style, designed by David Mocatta in 1839–40 which incorporated the head office of the railway company. This building still stands but has been largely obscured by later additions. The station is said to have many similarities to Nine Elms station of the London and Southampton Railway (1838) designed by Sir William Tite. Baker & Son were paid £9,766 15s for the station building between May and August 1841. The platform accommodation was built by John Urpeth Rastrick and consisted of four pitched roofs, each 250 ft (76 m) long. It opened for trains to Shoreham on 12 May 1840 and to London on 21 September 1841.

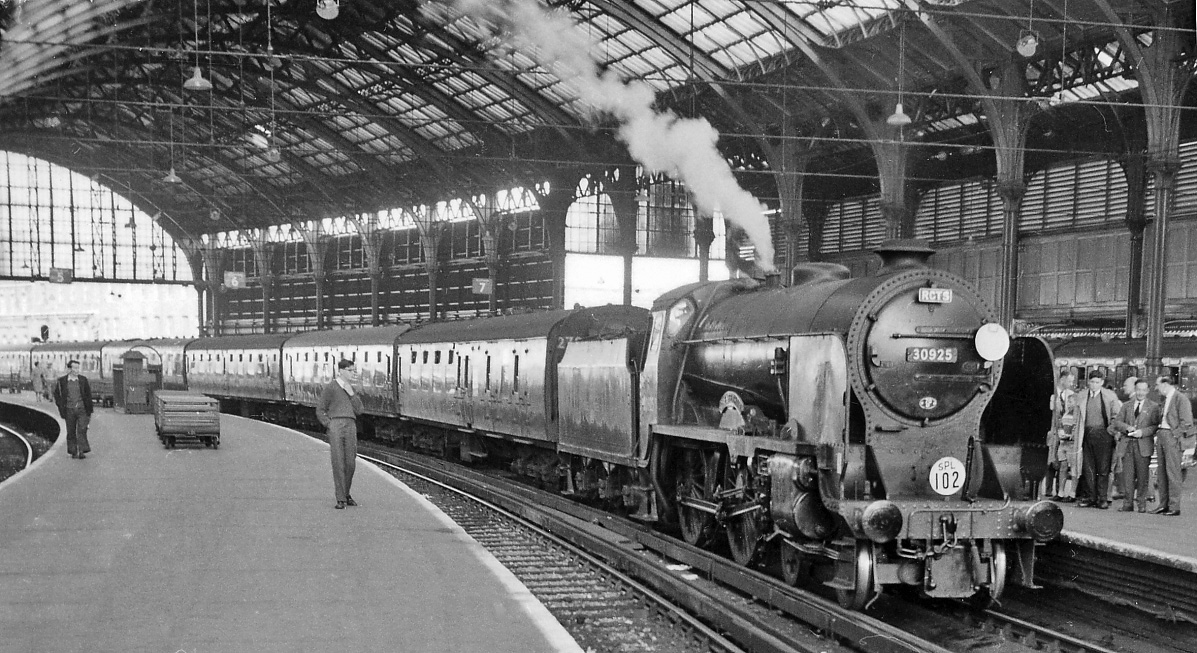
Steam engine no. 30925 Cheltenham departing from the station, 1962

The station site was extended for the opening of the Brighton, Lewes and Hastings Railway on 8 June 1846 (which had been purchased by the L&BR in 1845). In July 1846, the L&BR merged with other railways to form the London, Brighton & South Coast Railway.

Further extensions to the station occurred during the mid-19th century, but only a limited number of additional platforms could be added because of the awkward sloping site. By the late 1870s, the facilities were inadequate for the growing volume of traffic and so the existing platforms were lengthened to be able to accommodate two trains; the three separate roofs were replaced by one overall roof during 1882-83.

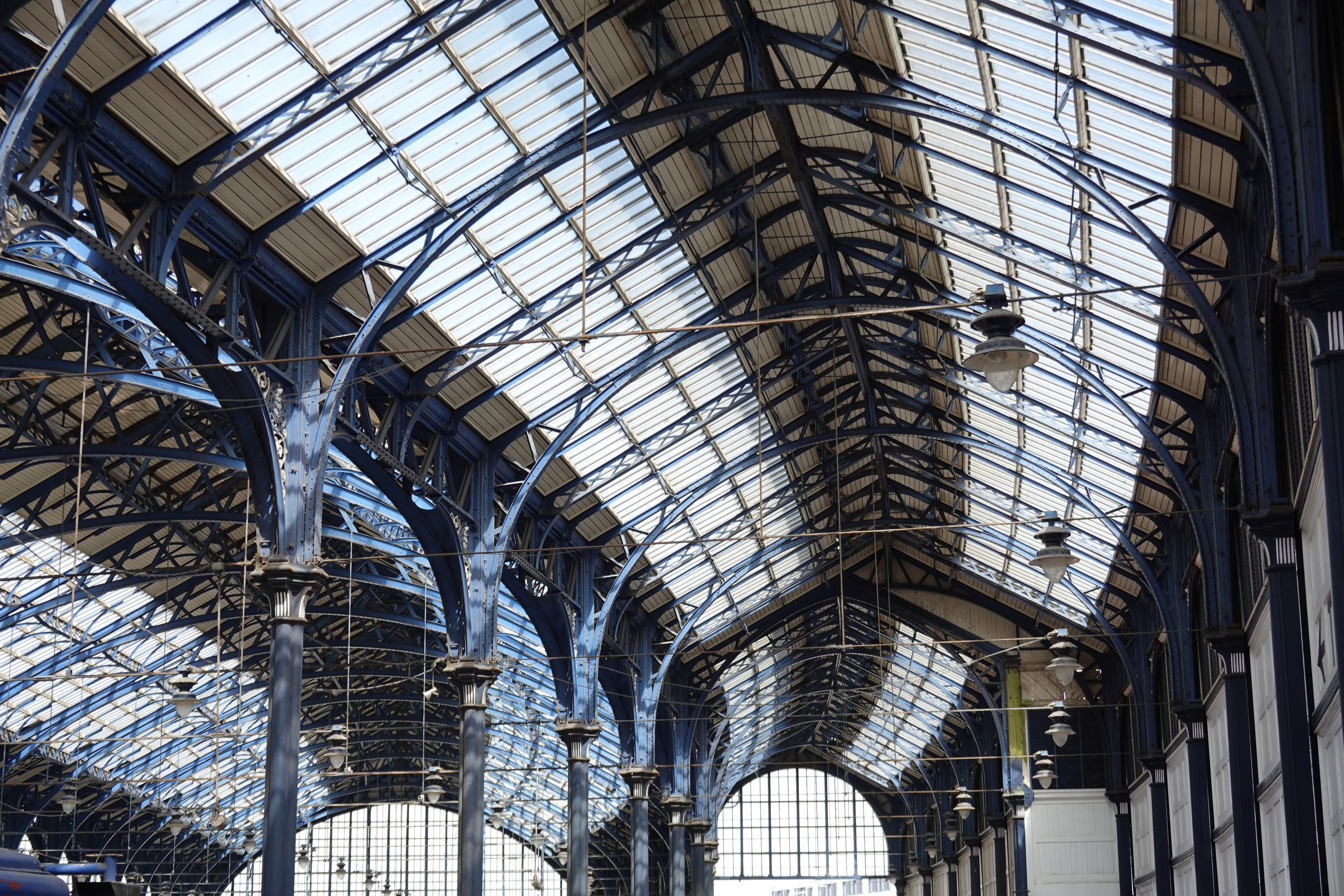
The station roof, after refurbishment

The station has an impressive large double-spanned curved glass and iron roof covering all of the platforms, which was substantially renovated in 1999 and 2000.

A tunnel runs under the station, which once provided an open-air cab run at a shallower gradient than Trafalgar Street outside, which had been the main approach to the station before the construction of Queen's Road, which was financially supported by the railway and intended to improve access. The cab run was covered, forming a tunnel, when the station above was extended over it on cast iron columns. The cab run remains in situ, but has been sealed at the station end, with the sloped entrance infilled with concrete, and is now used as a storage area.

Help, a dog used to collect charitable donations, was displayed at the station following its death in 1891.

=== Goods station and yard ===
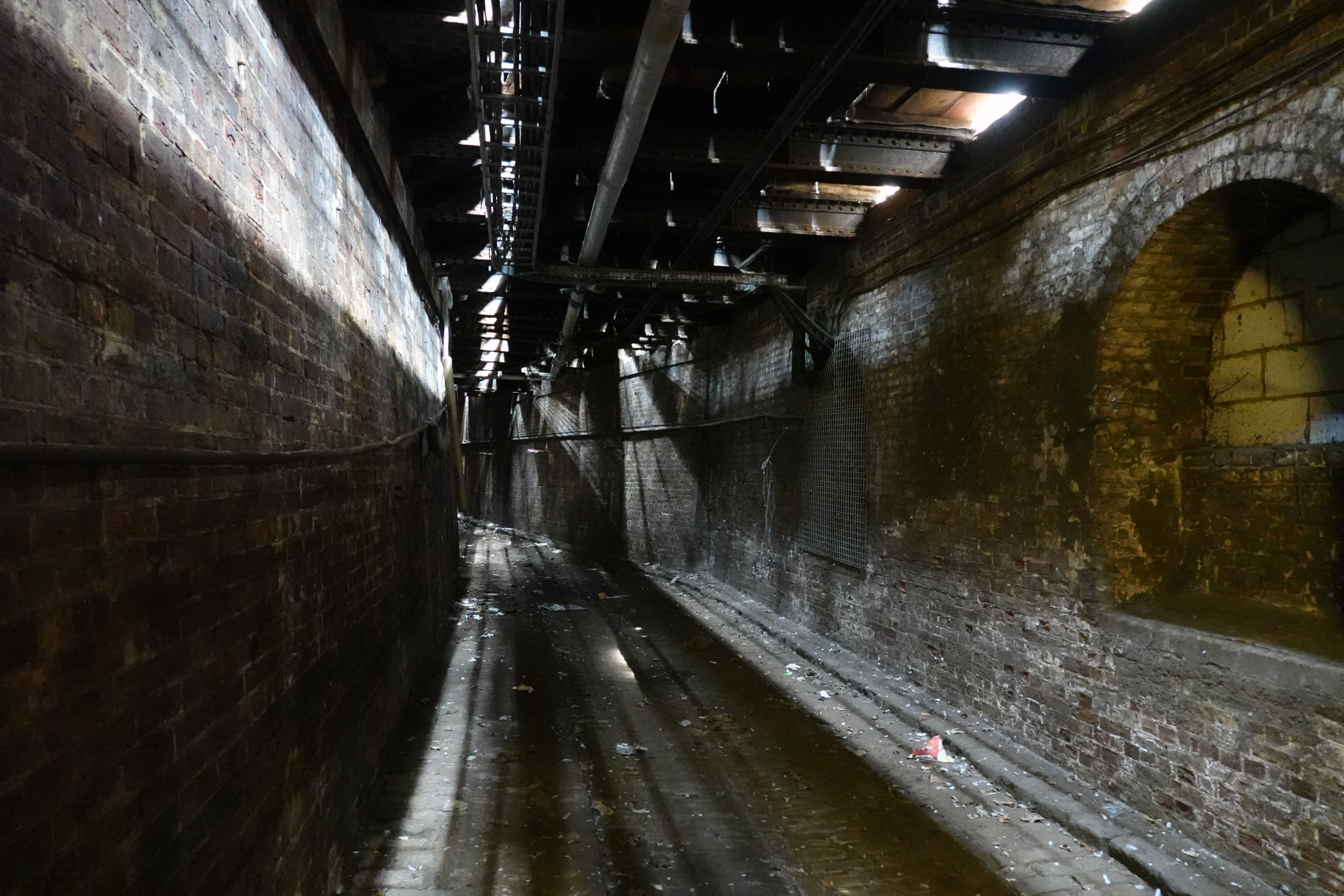
The old Cab Road used by horse-drawn taxi carriages

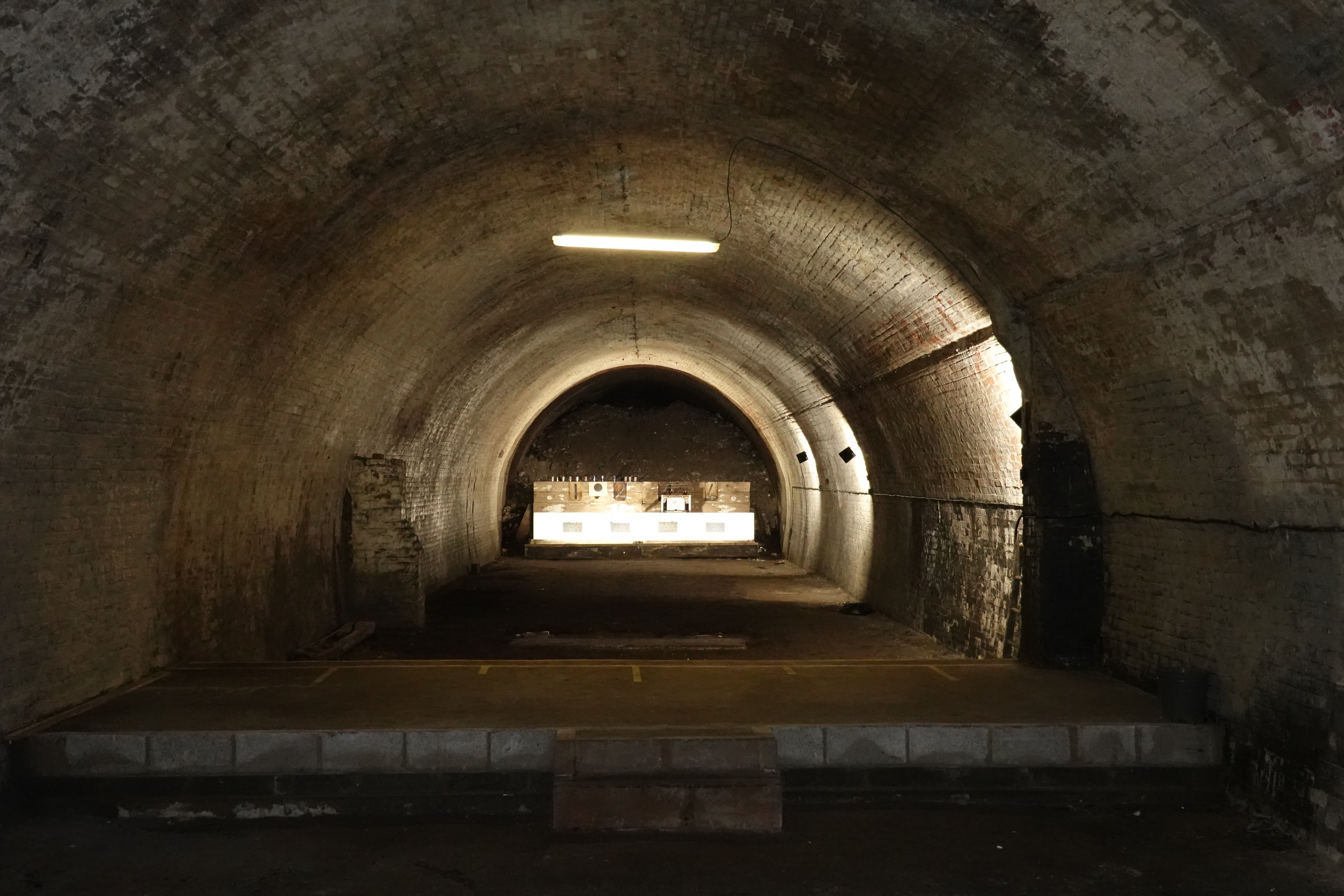
The rifle range located within the old goods tunnels, under the station

A goods station and yard was also constructed on the eastern side of the passenger station but on a site 30 ft lower (9.1 m) due to the sloping site, which was initially accessed from the Shoreham line by a second tunnel under the passenger station. The tunnel entrance was filled in after new tracks were laid into the goods yard, but a portion of it was converted into offices during World War II; these were in use until the early 21st century. A portion of the tunnel is still used by a local rifle club, with an entrance staircase accessible from platforms 6 and 7. The site of the goods yard has since been redeveloped and much of it forms the New England Quarter.

=== Locomotive and carriage works ===
To the north of the station, on the east side of the main line, the railway constructed its locomotive and carriage works, which opened in 1841; the carriage works was moved to Lancing in 1911 and the locomotive works was closed in 1957. Thereafter, Isetta cars were built briefly in a part of the works.

=== Locomotive depot ===
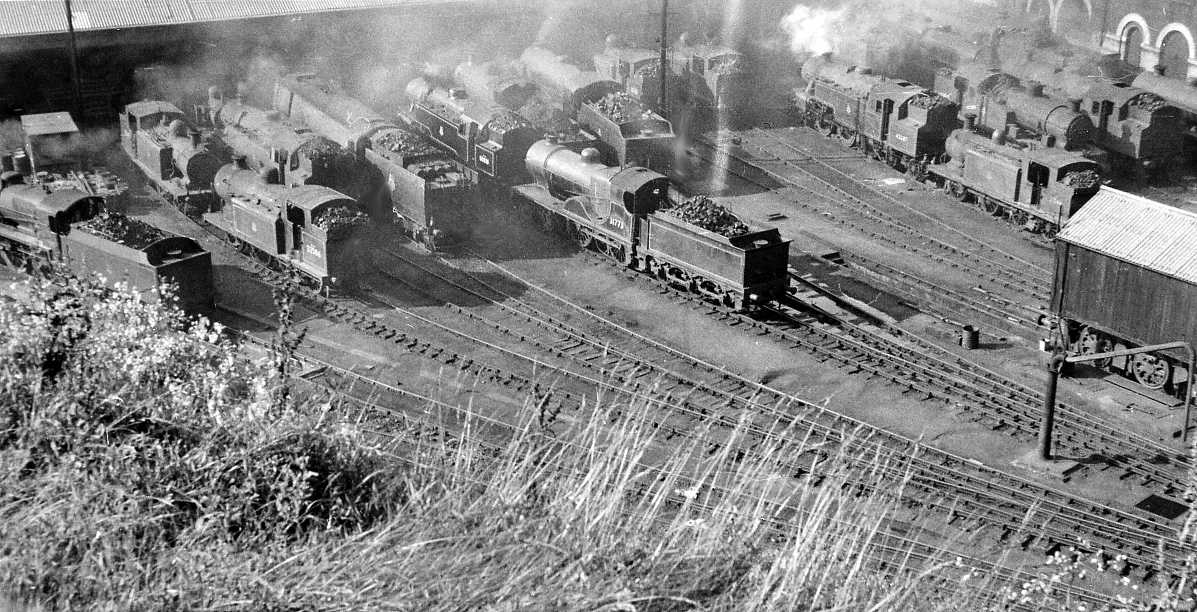
Brighton locomotive depot seen from above, 1954

The London & Brighton Railway opened a small locomotive shed and servicing facility to the north west of the station for locomotives on the Shoreham line, in May 1840, and another, adjacent to the locomotive works for main line locomotives, the following year.

During 1860–1861, John Chester Craven, the locomotive superintendent of the London, Brighton and South Coast Railway (LB&SCR), began the removal of a large chalk hill to the north of the station, which had been dumped during the excavation of the main line. The space created was used to accommodate a new much enlarged motive power depot in 1861, replacing the two existing facilities. During the early 1930s, following the electrification of the lines the steam motive power depot was rebuilt and reduced in size. It was closed 15 June 1961 but remained in use for stabling steam locomotives until 1964 and was demolished in 1966.

=== Listed status ===
Brighton station was Grade II* listed on 30 April 1973. As of February 2001, it was one of 70 Grade II*-listed buildings and structures and 1,218 listed buildings of all grades in the city of Brighton and Hove.

=== Accidents and incidents ===
- Arthur Wellesley, 2nd Duke of Wellington, died at the station on 13 August 1884.
- On 4 August 1909, a train hauled by Terrier no. 83 Earlswood collided with the buffers at Brighton, due to the driver's error. Nineteen people were injured.
- On 30 September 1922, control of a steam engine was lost at the engine shed; when it reached the turntable, there were no buffer stops to stop it. This caused the momentum of the engine to derail and crash through a brick wall into the street, injuring one passer-by.

=== Former operators and services ===
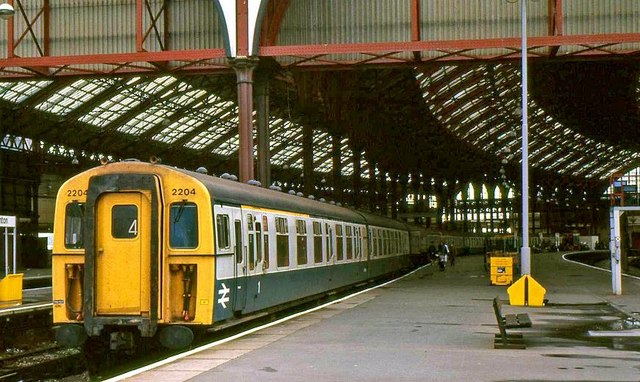
A 4-CIG operating under the Southern Region of British Rail, 1986

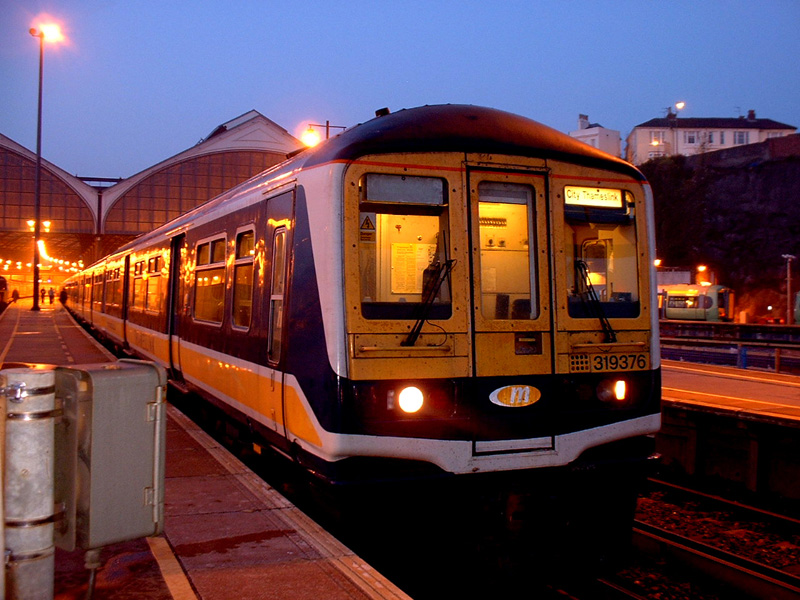
A Thameslink Class 319 at the station

The following companies have served Brighton in the past:

- London & Brighton Railway
- London, Brighton & South Coast Railway
- Southern Railway
- British Rail
- CrossCountry
- South West Trains
- Virgin CrossCountry
- Connex South Central
- Wessex Trains
- Thameslink (Note: An earlier company with the same name.)
- First Capital Connect
- Great Western Railway.

Former services include:

- Until 1967, a service operated between Brighton and Birkenhead Woodside, via Redhill, Reading, Oxford, Birmingham Snow Hill, Wolverhampton Low Level, Shrewsbury and Chester. The stock was provided on alternate days by British Railways' successors to the Southern Railway and the Great Western Railway, the Southern Region and Western Region.
- Until December 2007, South West Trains operated regular services to Reading and Paignton, via Worthing and Chichester.
- Until December 2008, CrossCountry and its predecessors operated services to Birmingham New Street and beyond.
- Until May 2018, Brighton was served by an hourly service to Ashford International, via Eastbourne; all Ashford trains now terminate at Eastbourne.
- Until May 2022, Great Western Railway operated limited three-car services to Bristol Temple Meads and beyond.

== Facilities ==
The station has a staffed ticket office, which is open 22 hours per day. There is a car park, with 633 spaces.

The concourse includes food shops, cafés, a newsagent, and other food and retail outlets. The front of the station often sees stalls and street food vans. Following a request in 2014 by the Labour MP for Hove, Peter Kyle, Southern added a street piano to the concourse, with a vintage Southern Railway logo inscribed.

== Layout ==
The station has eight platforms, numbered 1 to 8 from left to right when looking from the main entrance. All platforms are long enough to accommodate 12-car trains, except platform 1 that can only hold up to ten. There is step-free access to all platforms.

- Platforms 1 and 2 can only be used by services on the West Coastway line. (Note: Platform 2 also has a direct connection to the Brighton Main Line, with trains on that line being limited to four carriages in length; however, this link passes through the Brighton Lovers' Walk depot and is not used by any scheduled passenger services.) They are served by Southern services towards Hove, Worthing, West Worthing, Littlehampton, Chichester, Portsmouth Harbour and Southampton Central.
- Platform 3 is the only platform that can be used by services on all three lines, although trains on the West Coastway Line are limited to four carriages in length; services on the Brighton main and East Coastway lines are not restricted. The signalling also allows this platform to be occupied by two units on two separate lines at the same time, with a West Coastway train at the near end of the platform and a Brighton main or East Coastway train (up to four carriages long) at the far end. During the day, the platform is usually used by Southern and Gatwick Express services to London Victoria.
- Platforms 4-8 can be used by services on the Brighton Main Line and the East Coastway line. Usually, platform 4 shares with platform 3 the Southern and Gatwick Express services to London Victoria; platform 5 is served by Thameslink trains to Cambridge; platform 6 by those to Bedford; and platforms 7 and 8 are used by Southern services on the East Coastway Line.

== Services ==
Current services at Brighton are operated by three train operating companies; these provide the following general off-peak services in trains per hour (tph):

Southern:

- 2 tph to Seaford
- 2 tph to Eastbourne; of which:
  - 1 tph continues to Ore
- 1 tph to Portsmouth & Southsea
- 1 tph to Chichester, via Littlehampton
- 2 tph to Southampton Central.

Gatwick Express:

- 2 tph to London Victoria, via Gatwick Airport; trains operate non-stop to Haywards Heath.

Thameslink:

- 2 tph to Bedford, via Gatwick Airport, London Bridge and Luton
- 2 tph to Cambridge, via Gatwick Airport, London Bridge and Stevenage.

| Preceding station | National Rail | Following station |
|---|---|---|
| Haywards Heath (Preston Park during peak hours) | Gatwick Express Brighton Main Line | Terminus |
| Preston Park or Burgess Hill | Thameslink Brighton Main Line | Terminus |
| London Road or Moulsecoomb | Southern East Coastway Line | Terminus |
| Hove | Southern West Coastway Line | Terminus |
| | Disused railways | |
| Hove | British Rail; Southern Region Steyning Line | Terminus |

== Maintenance depot ==
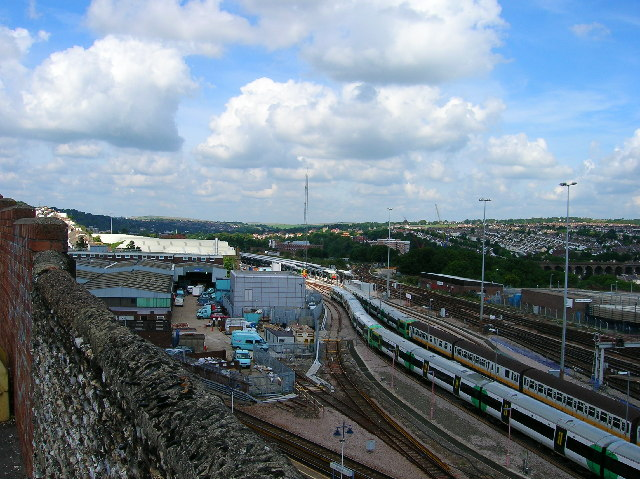
The maintenance depot

The site is currently Network Rail's ECR and infrastructure maintenance depot, and Southern's Lovers' Walk Depot. It is used for servicing most of Southern's single voltage Class 377 fleet and formerly its Class 313 electric multiple units.

Both Thameslink and Southern have driver, on-board supervisor and conductor depots at Brighton station.

== Onward connections ==
There is a bus station in front of the concourse. It has six stops, which are served by several Brighton & Hove routes; these connect the station with Brighton town centre, Hove, Saltdean, Portslade Village, Falmer and Eastbourne.

A taxi rank is outside the rear of the station.

== Events ==
Brighton & Hove Albion F.C.'s matches at the Falmer Stadium are served by train services from Brighton to Falmer. A queuing system is in operation from two hours before kick off for trains departing from platforms 7 and 8. The stadium's 31,800 capacity means these queues are large close to kick off. After the game, fans leave the station via the emergency gates and a queuing system is in operation for West Coastway Line services departing from platforms 1 and 2.

The Lewes Bonfire night, held annually on or around 5 November, attracts large numbers of people, many travelling through Brighton station. As a result, Southern operate a queuing system from the afternoon onwards.

The London to Brighton Bike Ride in June each year attracts large numbers of cyclists. As a result, Southern bans bicycles from many trains on the day; on the following day, it operates a queuing system at the station. In the past, train operators had allowed bicycles on trains for the many cyclists returning to London.

== See also ==
- London to Brighton in Four Minutes: A short BBC film from the early 1950s, showing a sped-up train journey
- Transport in Brighton and Hove.
