= London Road Viaduct =

Bridge in Brighton, UK

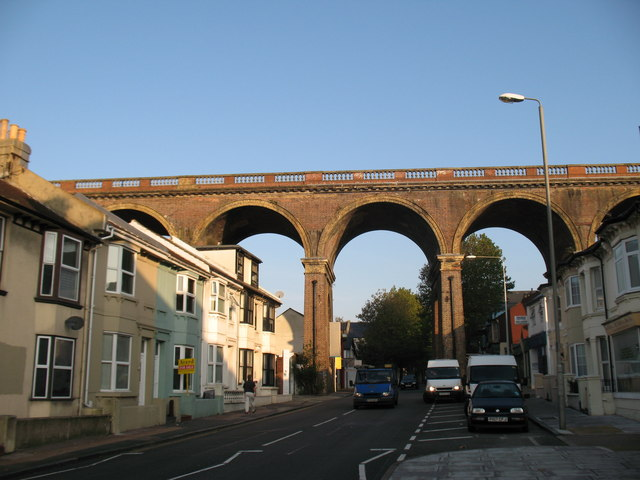
- The viaduct in 2008
- Coordinates: 50°50′07″N 0°08′32″W
- Carries: Railway
- Locale: Brighton
- Maintained by: Network Rail
- Heritage status: Grade II*-listed

Characteristics
- Material: Brick
- Total length: 1,200 feet (370 m)
- Height: 67 feet (20 m)
- No. of spans: 27

History
- Designer: John Urpeth Rastrick
- Construction start: 29 May 1845
- Construction end: 28 March 1846

Location
- Interactive map of London Road Viaduct

The London Road Viaduct is a brick railway viaduct in Brighton, part of the city of Brighton and Hove in East Sussex, England. It carries the East Coastway Line between Brighton and London Road railway stations. Built in the 1840s for the Brighton, Lewes and Hastings Railway by the locomotive engineer and railway architect John Urpeth Rastrick, the sharply curving structure has 27 arches and about 10 million bricks. It is still in constant use, and is listed at Grade II* for its historical and architectural significance.

== History ==
The London and Brighton Railway Act, passed on 15 July 1837, granted the London & Brighton Railway Company the right to build a railway line from Norwood to Brighton, a branch line from Brighton to Shoreham-by-Sea and another from Brighton to Newhaven via Lewes. The line to Shoreham-by-Sea was completed first, in 1840, and the Brighton Main Line opened in its entirety in September 1841; but the route eastwards from Brighton towards Lewes was delayed until 8 June 1846. A new company, the Brighton, Lewes & Hastings Railway Company, was formed to build this line; John Urpeth Rastrick was employed as the surveyor and architect. The two companies and others amalgamated in July 1846 to form the London, Brighton and South Coast Railway.

In the 1840s, the land northeast of Brighton station was undeveloped, consisting of fields. It lay in a steep-sided valley running from north to south, created by the Wellesbourne river (by then, reduced to an intermittently flowing, mostly underground winterbourne). Rastrick had to decide whether to cross this with an embankment or a viaduct. Local opinion favoured an embankment, and he faced opposition and criticism when he chose to build a viaduct. Nevertheless, he planned a route for it, and laid the foundation stone on 29 May 1845. Construction took 10 months: the structure was ready on 28 March 1846, more than two months before the line to Lewes opened. By the 1870s, dense terraced housing surrounded the viaduct: residential development was stimulated by the opening of the railway.

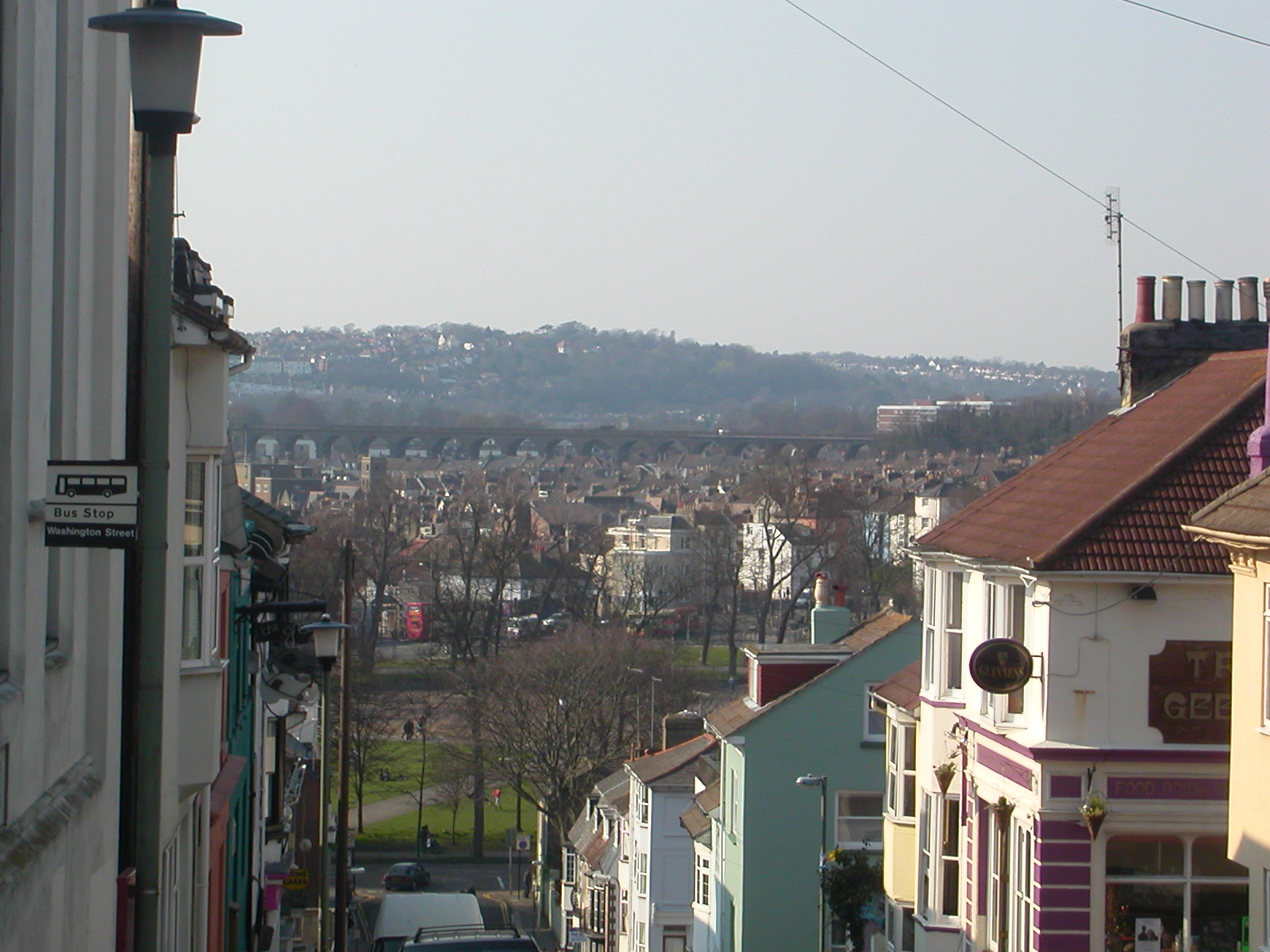
The viaduct viewed from the higher ground of Hanover

Brighton's most significant bombing raid of the Second World War severely damaged London Road Viaduct. At 12.30pm on 25 May 1943, Focke-Wulf fighter-bomber aircraft dropped several bombs on Brighton, five of which landed on the railway. One demolished two arches and one pier at the west end of the viaduct, two arches west of the Preston Road span, leaving the tracks spanning the gap in mid-air. Despite this, a temporary repair allowed trains to start using the viaduct again within 24 hours; in less than a month, the service was back to normal. Until the arches were fully repaired in September 1943, however, a 15 mph (24 km/h) speed restriction was enforced and Preston Road could be seen through the gaps between the sleepers where the brickwork had been blasted away. The replacement brickwork, darker than that of the main structure, can be seen from the road below.

== Architecture ==
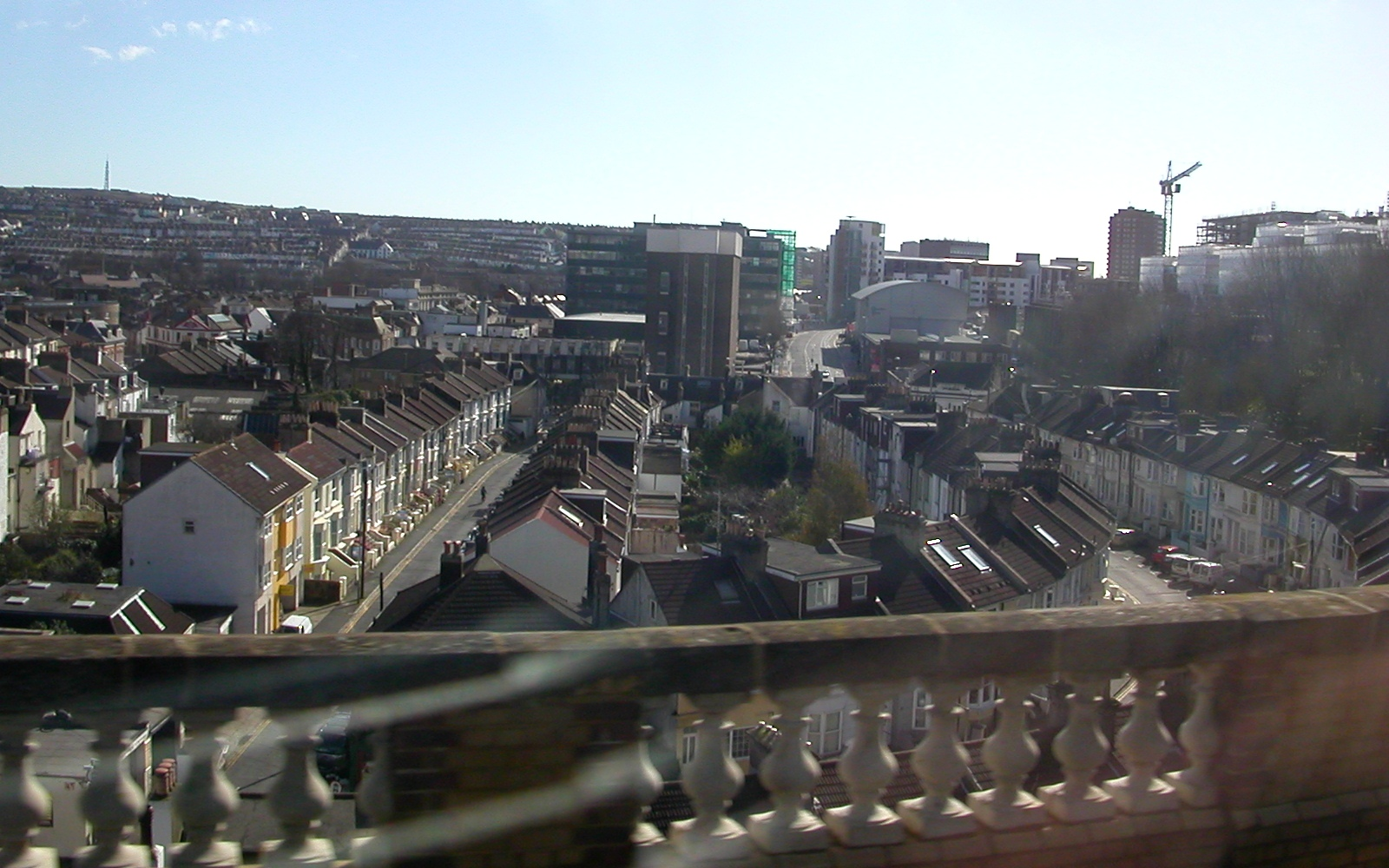
Southward view from a train, showing the decorative balusters

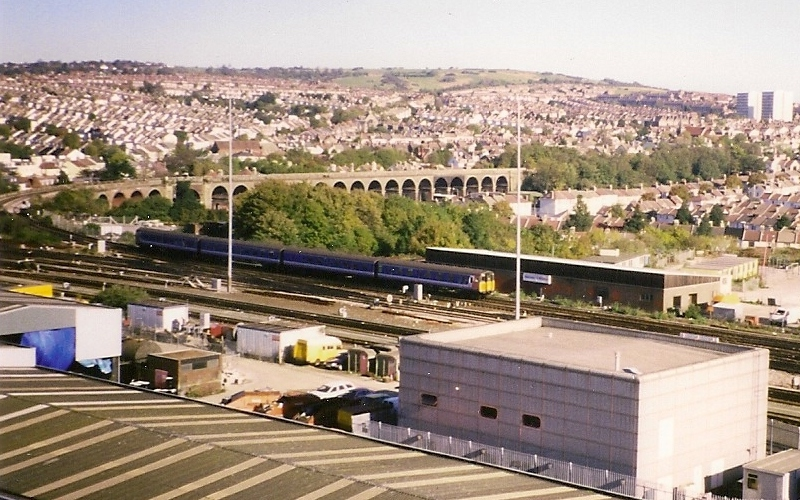
The viaduct in 1996

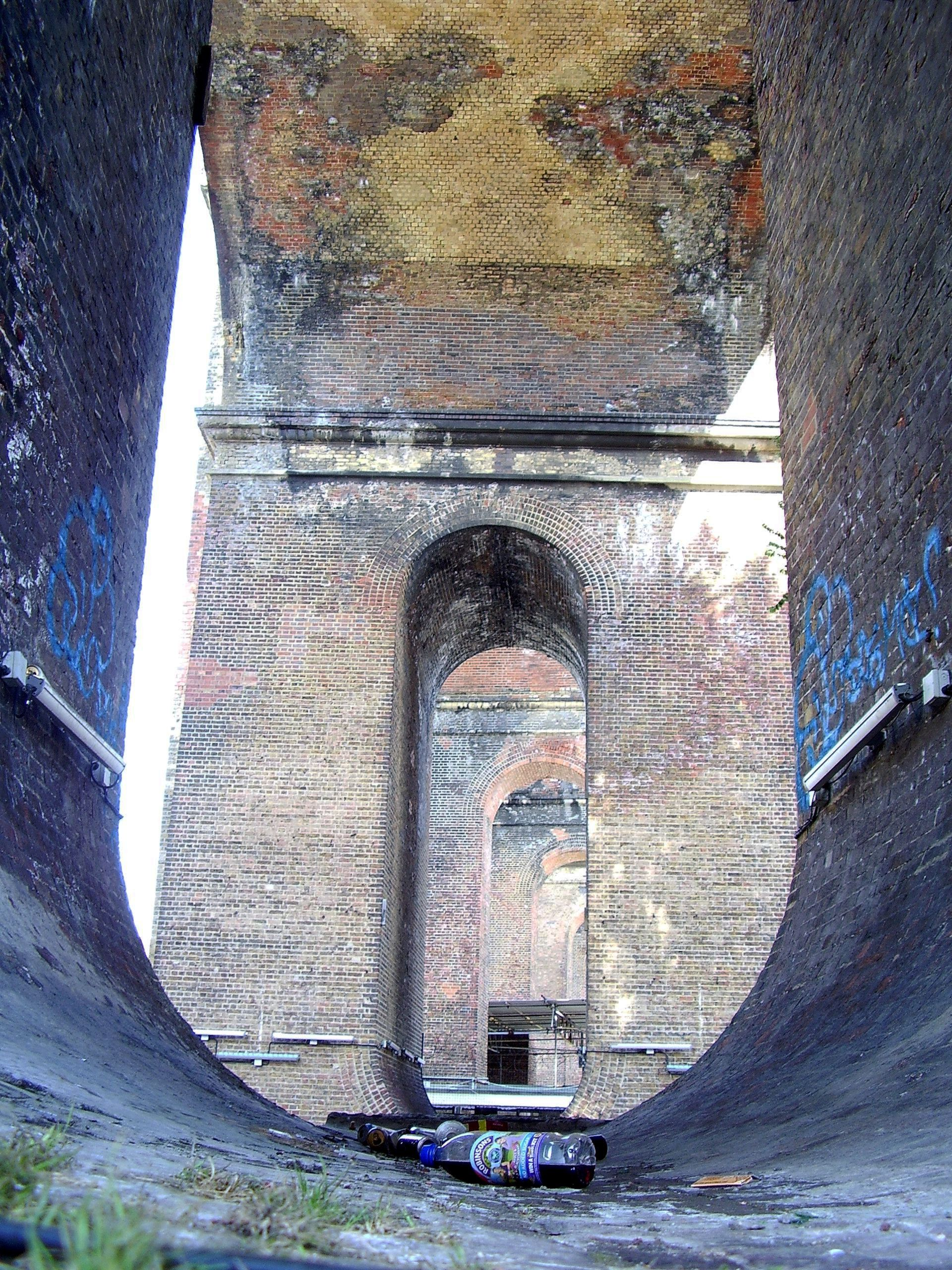
View though the pierced piers, showing patchwork repairs

The structure is 1,200 feet (370 m) long, and reaches a maximum height of 67 feet (20 m) above the floor of the valley. It consists of 26 semi-circular arches each of 30 feet (9.1 m) with piers of 7 feet (2.1 m) thick at the base and 5 feet (1.5 m) thick at the top, together with one elliptical arch of 50 feet (15 m) over a section of the A23 London Road called Preston Road. The piers of this arch are 22 feet (6.7 m) thick at the base and 19.5 feet (5.9 m) thick at the top. Each pier contains a jack arch with a semi-circular soffitt and invert to reduce the number of bricks required. The piers are thicker on the outside than on the inside because the viaduct is constructed on a sharp curve: trains reach the viaduct almost immediately after leaving the Brighton Main Line, and the line continues to curve away for several hundred metres. Of the 27 arches, 16 have a radius of curvature of 0.75 miles (1.21 km), and 11 have a radius of 0.125 miles (0.201 km).

Approximately 10 million bricks were needed to build the viaduct. The brickwork is red and brown, with yellow brick dressings. The wartime reconstruction used blue brick, a darker type often used for heavy-duty construction. The 26 narrower arches are round-headed, whereas the wider span across Preston Road is elliptical. Each pier has a long, rectangular opening on each inner side, with rounded arches at the top and bottom. Running along the top of the viaduct on both sides is a balustrade with stone balusters.

== The viaduct today ==
London Road Viaduct was listed at Grade II* by English Heritage on 19 April 1974. This status is given to "particularly important buildings of more than special interest". As of February 2001, it was one of 70 Grade II*-listed buildings and structures, and 1,218 listed buildings of all grades, in the city of Brighton and Hove.

As of 2009, 174 scheduled passenger trains (87 eastbound and 87 westbound), all operated by Southern, cross the viaduct each weekday. There are fewer train movements at weekends.

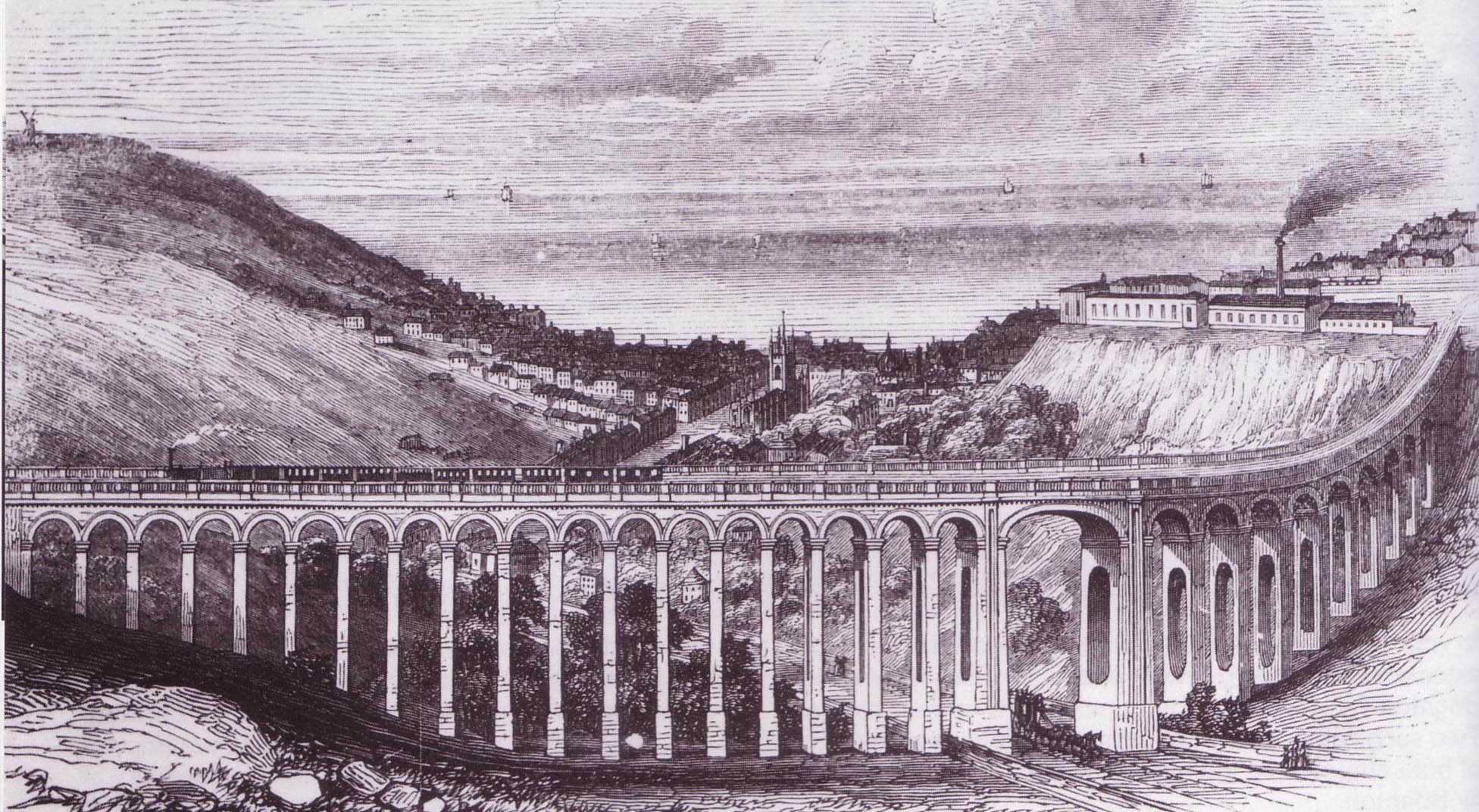
View of the viaduct as built, looking towards St Peter's Church, Brighton with Brighton railway works visible on top of the cliff
