= Brighton, Lewes and Hastings Railway =

English railway company, 1844–1846

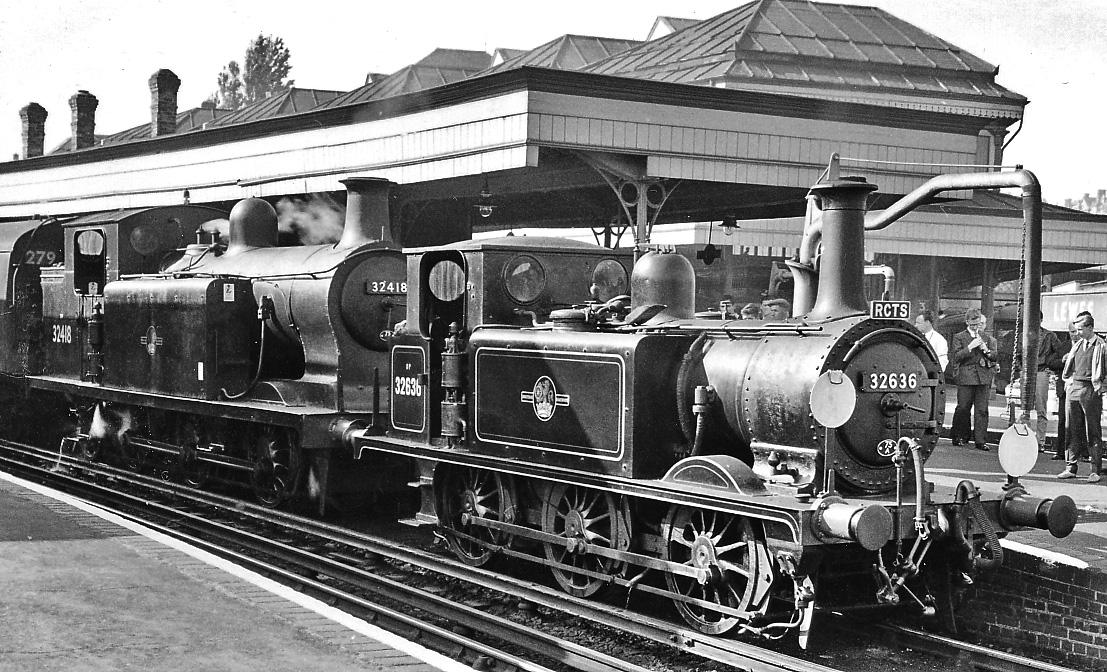
A railtour at Lewes in 1962

The Brighton, Lewes and Hastings Railway was an early railway in southern England that built the East Coastway line running between the three East Sussex towns mentioned in its name. The company existed from February 1844 but only operated trains for a few weeks during June and July 1846 before it was amalgamated with other companies to form the London Brighton and South Coast Railway (LB&SCR) on 27 July 1846.

== History ==
=== Authorisation ===
Brighton, Lewes and Hastings Railway Act 1844
- Act of Parliament
- Parliament of the United Kingdom
- Long title: An Act for making a Railway from the London and Brighton Railway to Lewes and Hastings, with a Branch therefrom, all in the County of Sussex.
- Citation: 7 & 8 Vict. c. xci

Dates
- Royal assent: 29 July 1844

Text of statute as originally enacted

The London and Brighton Railway Act 1837 (7 Will. 4 & 1 Vict. c. cxix), which establishing the London and Brighton Railway (LBR), authorised the construction of branch lines to Shoreham and to Newhaven, but only the first of these was built. A new company was created in 1844 to build the second such a line, with an extension to join the South Eastern Railway at Hastings, which would be operated by the LBR. The new company received approval in an act of Parliament, the Brighton, Lewes and Hastings Railway Act 1844 (7 & 8 Vict. c. xci) on 29 July 1844, with permission for the directors to sell their concern to the LBR. The sale took place in 1845, although the company continued as a separate entity.

=== Construction and opening ===
The line involved constructing the London Road viaduct at Brighton, together with a long bank and tunnel at Falmer. The engineer was John Urpeth Rastrick. Construction started in September 1844 and the section between Brighton and Lewes was opened on 8 June 1846. The company ceased to exist when it was merged with others to form the London Brighton and South Coast Railway the following month. Further work on the line was completed by the LB&SCR.
