= Preston Park railway station =

Railway station in Brighton, England

Coordinates: 50°50′45″N 00°09′18″W

Preston Park
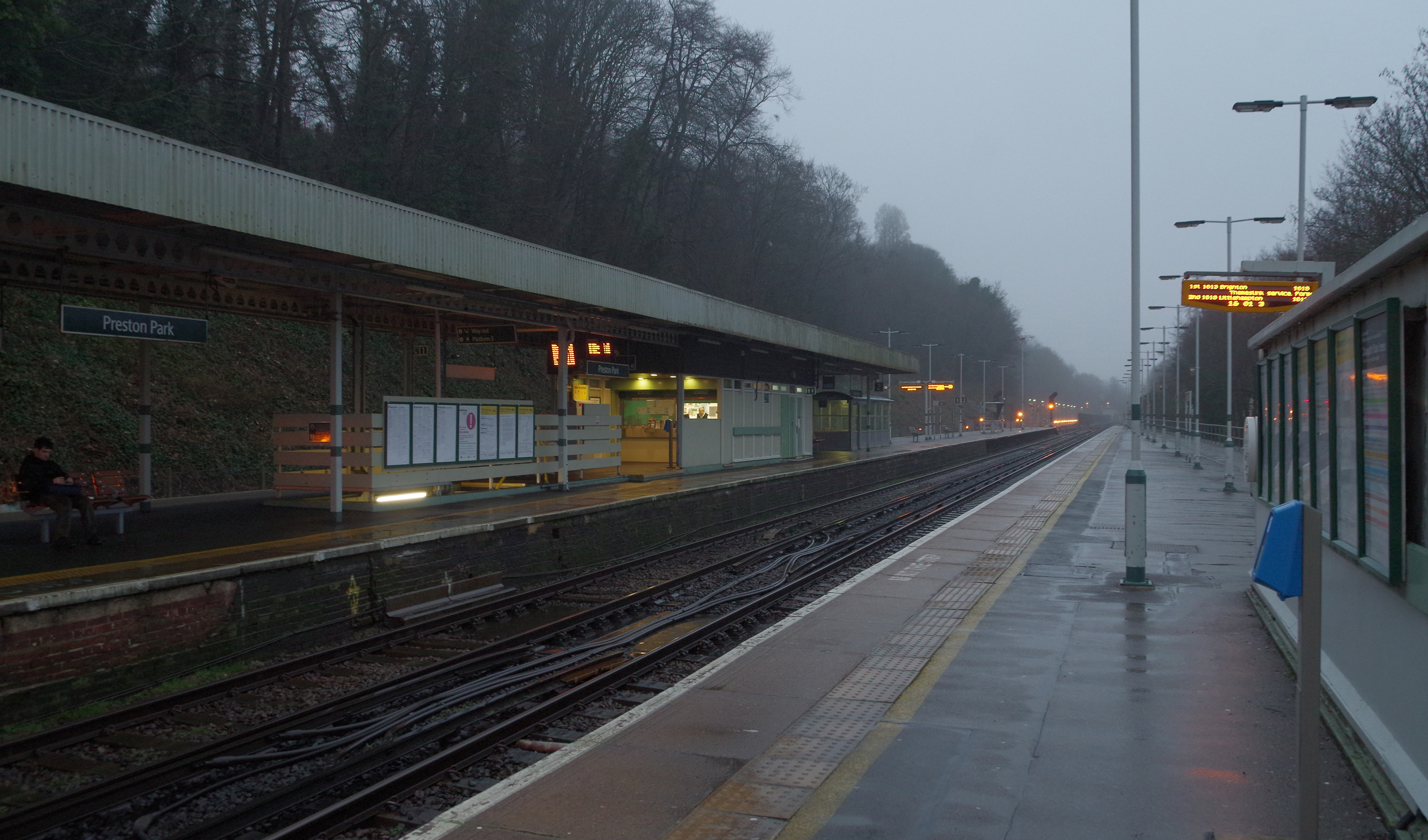
- Preston Park in 2015

General information
- Location: Preston Village, City of Brighton and Hove; England
- Grid reference: TQ299067
- Manager: Southern
- Platforms: 3

Other information
- Station code: PRP
- Classification: DfT category D

Key dates
- 1 November 1869: Opened (Preston)
- 1 July 1879: Renamed (Preston Park)

Passengers
- 2020/21: ▼0.222 million
- 2021/22: ▲0.674 million
- 2022/23: ▲0.844 million
- 2023/24: ▲0.970 million
- 2024/25: ▲1.126 million
Location
Notes
- Passenger statistics from the Office of Rail and Road

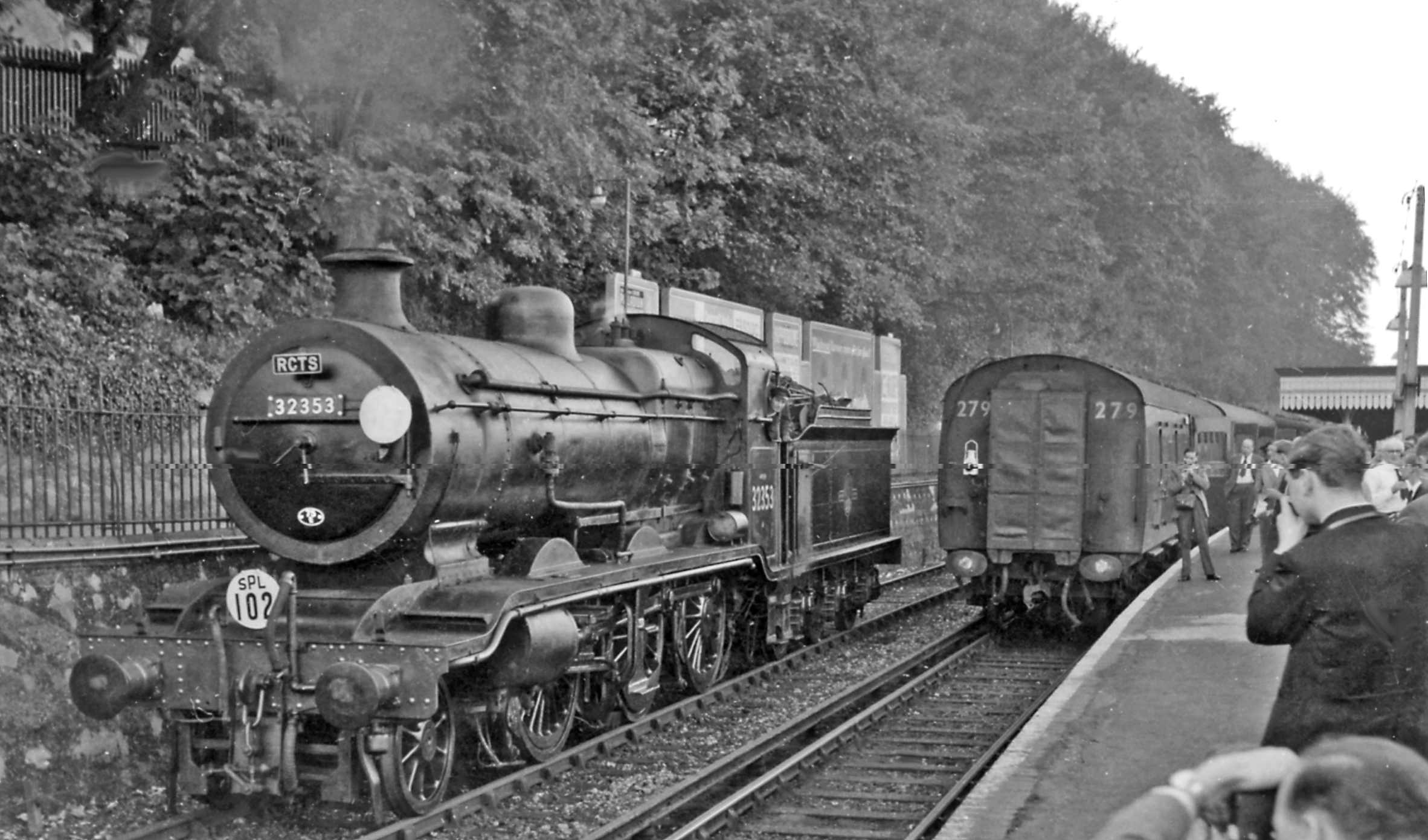
RCTS railtour in 1962.

Preston Park railway station is on the Brighton Main Line in England, serving Preston Village and the northern suburban areas of the city of Brighton and Hove, East Sussex. It is 49 miles 21 chains (79.3 km) from London Bridge via Redhill, between Hassocks and Brighton.

The station is managed by Southern, which is one of three companies that serve the station, alongside Thameslink and Gatwick Express. Gatwick Express provides a limited number of services at peak times only.

There are also two spur tracks which run south from Preston Park through Cliftonville Tunnel to Hove.

== History ==
The London Brighton and South Coast Railway opened a new station named Preston, on 1 November 1869 to serve the growing parish of Preston, then north of the Brighton boundary. The station was enlarged and remodelled to its present design in 1879 during the construction of the Cliftonville Curve spur line from the main line to Hove and the West Sussex coast line. The station was then renamed Preston Park although the nearby Preston Park did not exist until 1883.

In 1881 the railway murderer Percy Lefroy Mapleton alighted at the station after having killed Isaac Frederick Gold and dumped his body in Balcombe tunnel.

== Facilities ==
The station has a pair of island platforms, linked by a subway; only three platform faces are now in operation. The three tracks through the station reduce to two before traversing Patcham Tunnel, almost two miles (3.2 km) further north.

Brighton & Hove Albion Football Club's former home, Withdean Stadium is located a short walk from the station, and for this reason, during its tenancy of the stadium, the club offered free travel vouchers with its match tickets — allowing fans to travel from Brighton to Preston Park without there being an apparent surcharge of the train fare.

== Services ==
Off-peak, services at Preston Park are operated by Southern and Thameslink using Class 377 and 700 EMUs.

The typical off-peak service in trains per hour is:

- 2 tph to Bedford via London Bridge
- 2 tph to London Victoria
- 2 tph to Brighton
- 2 tph to Littlehampton via Worthing

During peak hours, there are also a number of peak hour Thameslink services to Cambridge, as well one Southern train per day in each direction between Littlehampton and London Bridge.

In addition, the station is served by a number of peak hour Gatwick Express services which usually pass through Preston Park. These services run non-stop from Gatwick Airport to London Victoria and are operated using Class 387 EMUs.

Preceding station	National Rail	Following station
Hassocks	Thameslink Brighton Main Line	Brighton
Hassocks	Gatwick Express Gatwick Express Peak Hours Only	Brighton
Hassocks	Southern West Coastway Line	Hove

== See also ==
- Brighton railway station
- Transport in Brighton and Hove
