= Patcham Tunnel =

Railway tunnel in southern England

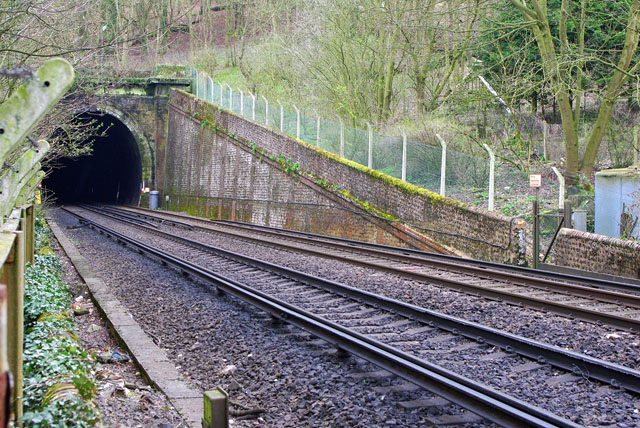
- The northern entrance to Patcham Tunnel
- Interactive map of Patcham Tunnel

Overview
- Line: Brighton Main Line
- Location: South Downs, East Sussex
- Coordinates: 50°51′52″N 0°09′23″W

Operation
- Work began: 1840
- Opened: 1841
- Owner: Network Rail

Patcham Tunnel (or Compulsory Tunnel) is a railway tunnel on the Brighton Main Line through the South Downs between Preston Park and Hassocks in East Sussex, England. It is 446 metres (488 yards) long.

Its construction was neither necessitated by the local geography nor originally intended but, following the objections of a local landowner, the tunnel's creation was specifically stipulated by Parliament as a condition for the authorising the line. Accordingly, the London and Brighton Railway had their line directed through a purpose-built tunnel instead of a cutting. Patcham Tunnel was constructed between 1840 and 1841; the work was beset by a collapse part-way through. Entering service as intended, the tunnel has demonstrated a tendency to flood and has been repeatedly blamed for the sporadic cancellations of services on the Brighton Main Line.

== History ==
Patcham Tunnel was constructed by the London and Brighton Railway as one element of the first line between London and Brighton. The original plans for the railway did not involve a tunnel at this location, but engineers had not predicted that the owner of Patcham Place, Major John Payne, would object to a cutting being constructed through land that he owned. Thus, it was decided to construct a tunnel running underneath Coney Wood. In reference to the origins of the tunnel, said to have been unnecessary save for a clause inserted into the London and Brighton Railway Act 1837 (7 Will. 4 & 1 Vict. c. cxix), which authorised the line's construction, it was sometimes referred to as the Compulsory Tunnel.

Construction of Patcham Tunnel took place between 1840 and 1841. The engineer for the line was John Urpeth Rastrick, but the contractor responsible for the brick lined tunnel is not known. It features a single ventilation shaft along its bore. Partway through construction, the tunnel suffered a collapse, although no fatalities were attributed to the incident.

Between October 2018 and February 2019, Patcham Tunnel was subject to a series of scheduled repairs as part of a £300m improvement programme on the Brighton Main Line; work was undertaken to reduce the ingress of water and re-lay the tracks during temporary closures. However, occasional closures of the line due to flooding of Patcham tunnel have persisted even after these remedial works were completed.
