= Germany's Most Beautiful Railways =

German night-time television program

- German: Die Schönsten Bahnstrecken Deutschlands
- Genre: Documentary
- Presented by: No-one
- Country of origin: Germany

Original release
- Network: ARD
- Release: 3 September 1995 – 28 October 2013

Related
- Europe's Most Beautiful Railways; The World's Most Beautiful Railways

Die Schönsten Bahnstrecken Deutschlands (Germany's Most Beautiful Railways) was a regular night-time feature on Germany's ARD television channel which ran from 3 September 1995 to 28 October 2013.

The programme was a real-time, mostly uninterrupted, recording of railway journeys as viewed from the driver's cab. There was no commentary or music, but the sounds of the recording were retained for broadcast. Small interruptions did occur if the train was traversing a tunnel or sat at a station, usually cutting away to view some of the cab's controls. The camera did not pan to take in scenery, being fixed in the forward position for the duration of the journey.

External shots of the train and the station building, and occasionally the wider town, were included at the route termini. A simple map of the route was displayed on screen at the beginning of the programme, and whilst the train was stationary in a station, the name of that station was also displayed. No supplementary information was provided.

The programme was used to fill the time between other programmes and as such was often cut short without explanation, so the following programme could start as scheduled.

Broadly considered a successful programme, there were two spin-offs: Die Schönsten Bahnstrecken Europas (Europe's Most Beautiful Railways) and Die Schönsten Bahnstrecken der Welt (The World's Most Beautiful Railways). These followed the same format and went to picturesque routes such as Glasgow to Mallaig, which was recorded on 8 September 1997.

Many of the journeys were released on VHS and DVD.

== Europe's Most Beautiful Railways ==
The following are journeys included in the European version of the series, which included some German railways.

Country	Line	Termini	Date of journey
United Kingdom	West Highland Line	Glasgow - Mallaig	8 September 1997
Germany	Black Forest Railway	Offenburg - Konstanz	7 November 1997
Italy	Riviera of Ponente	Sanremo - Genoa	12 November 1997
Italy	Train of Wonders	Cuneo - Sanremo	15 November 1997
Switzerland	Gornergrat Railway	Zermatt - Gornergrat	17 July 1999
Switzerland	Lötschberg line	Brig - Bern	23 July 2001
Austria	Tauern Railway	Salzburg - Villach	6 October 2001
Switzerland	GoldenPass Line	Montreux - Interlaken	13 May 2002
Austria	Mariazell Railway	St. Pölten - Mariazell	24 July 2002

== See also ==
- Eisenbahn-Romantik
- London to Brighton in Four Minutes
