= Hassocks railway station =

Railway station in West Sussex, England

Coordinates: 50°55′30″N 00°08′45″W

Hassocks
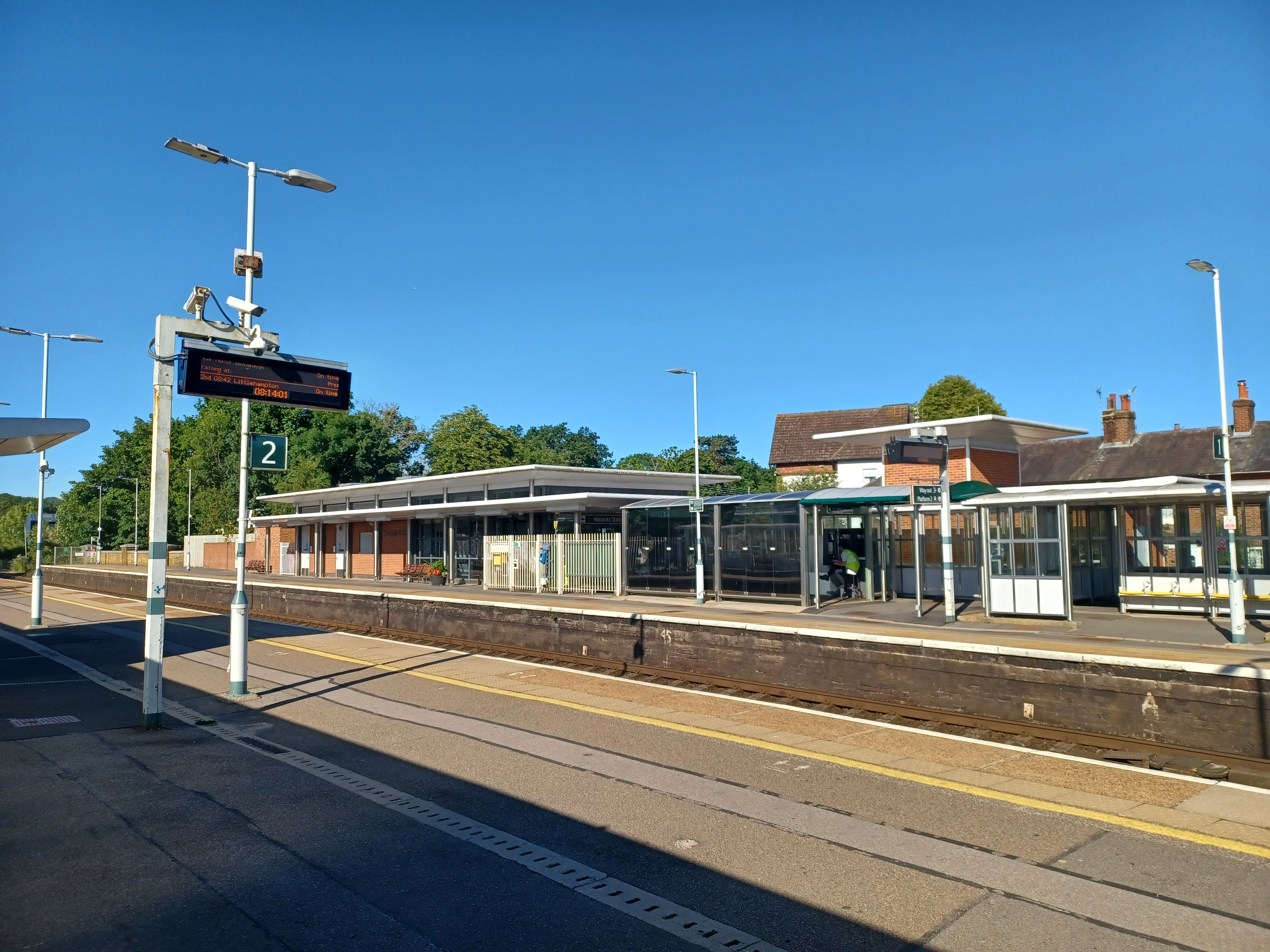

General information
- Location: Hassocks, District of Mid Sussex; England
- Grid reference: TQ304155
- Managed by: Southern
- Platforms: 2

Other information
- Station code: HSK
- Classification: DfT category C2

Key dates
- 21 September 1841: Opened as Hassocks Gate
- 1 October 1881: Renamed Hassocks
- 1973: Rebuilt

Passengers
- 2020/21: ▼0.329 million
- 2021/22: ▲0.821 million
- 2022/23: ▲1.020 million
- 2023/24: ▲1.121 million
- 2024/25: ▲1.255 million
Location
Notes
- Passenger statistics from the Office of Rail and Road

Hassocks railway station is on the Brighton Main Line in England, serving the village of Hassocks, West Sussex. It is 43 miles 42 chains (70.0 km) down the line from London Bridge via Redhill and is situated between Burgess Hill and Preston Park. It is managed by Southern.

Trains calling at Hassocks are operated by Southern and Thameslink.

== History ==
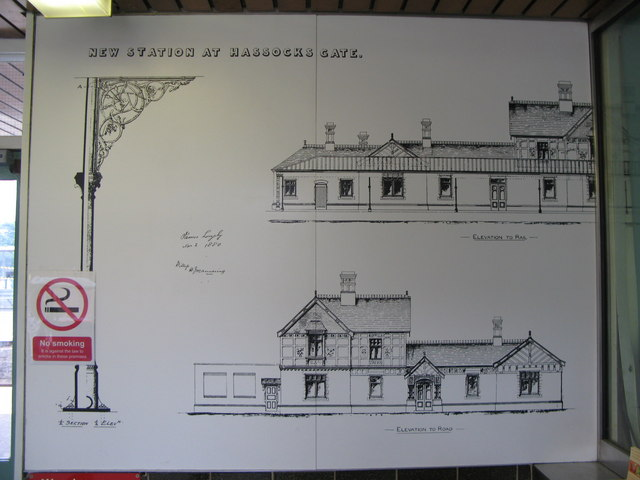
A facsimile of the second Victorian design drawings formerly on show in the ticket office

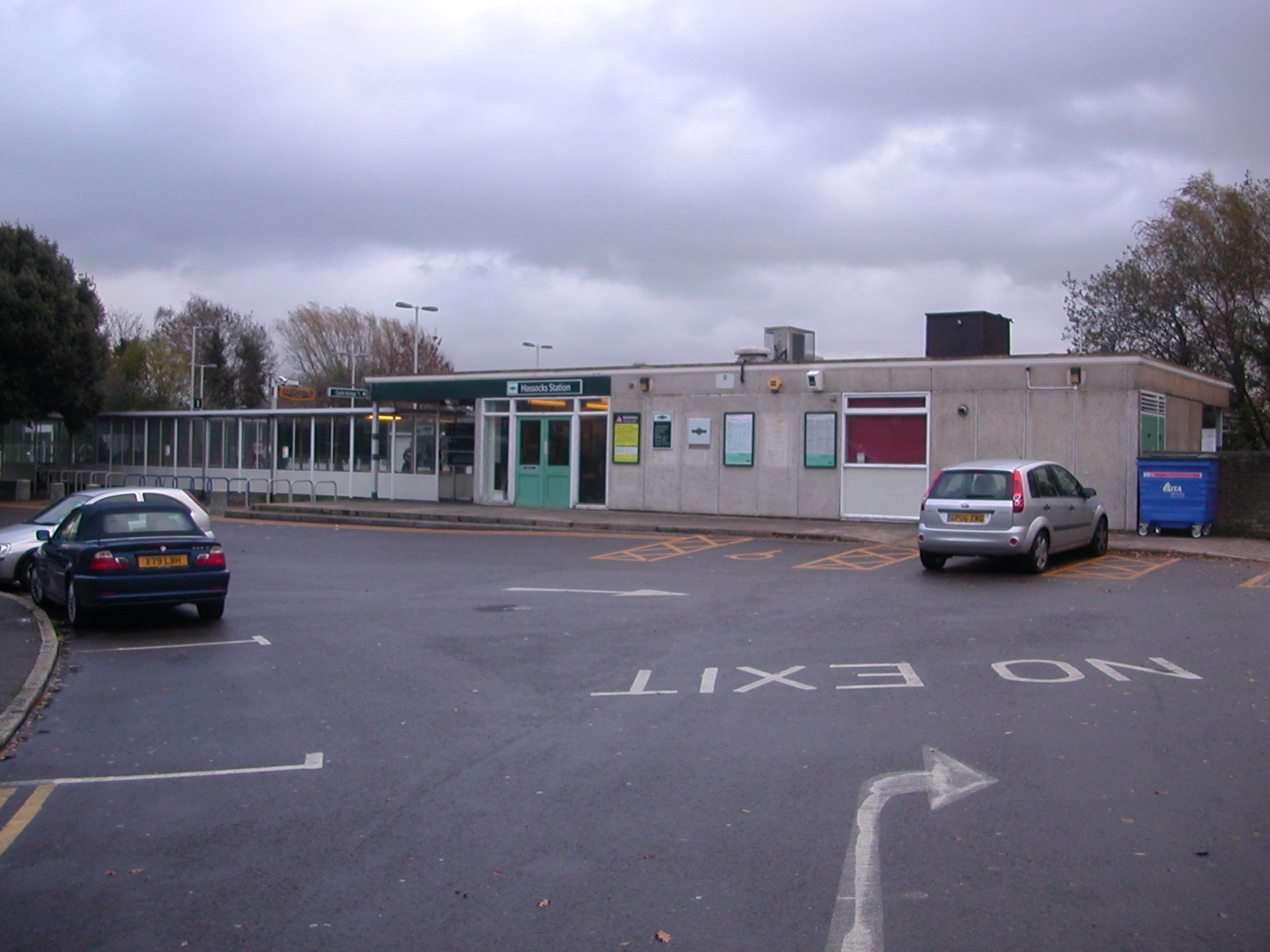
The now demolished main building on the up platform at Hassocks station

The station was named "Hassocks Gate" upon its opening on 21 September 1841 by the London and Brighton Railway, which became the London Brighton and South Coast Railway in 1846. It was one of the few intermediate stations on the line with four tracks, to allow express trains to overtake those stopping at the station. However, the number of tracks was later reduced to two, although the additional width is still apparent from the siting of the station buildings.

The original 1841 station building was designed by David Mocatta, the architect of the railway, in a simple cottage style, but using the same modular system that he applied to other stations on the line.

For many years Hassocks Gate station was used by excursion trains for passengers visiting the nearby South Downs and suffered as a result as it became a meeting place for prostitutes. It stands almost at the summit of the line's climb from London before passing through Clayton Tunnel, a short distance south of the station. This was the site of the Clayton Tunnel rail crash in 1861, resulting in 23 deaths and 176 injuries.

Between December 1880 and August 1881 a new station building was constructed by James Longley & Co of Crawley to the designs of Thomas Myres as the prototype for those later built in the same style on the Bluebell and Cuckoo line with a half-timbered upper storey, decorative brick eaves, stained glass windows and charming porches. The booking office was covered by a lantern-shaped roof and the platforms by wooden canopies on iron columns. The station was demolished in 1973 by British Rail and replaced with a CLASP structure which was described as "truly awful".

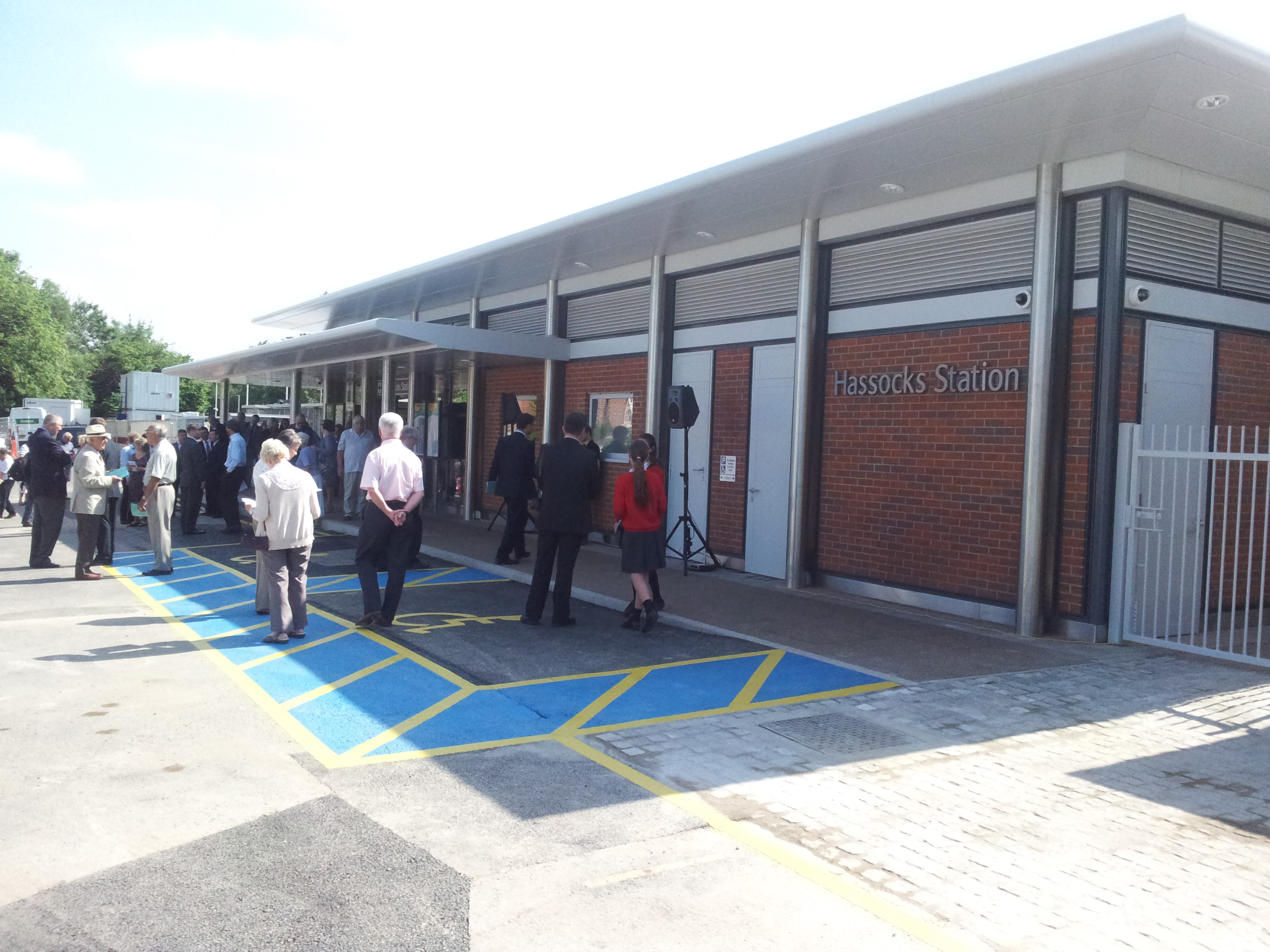
The opening of the new station building on 5 July 2013

In 2006 the local community announced that it was hoping to raise £2.5m to rebuild the station to the previous design. Although these plans fell through, in 2008 Network Rail announced that it would be carrying out an 18-month feasibility study to identify possible improvements to the existing building in order to facilitate access by the disabled and elderly. Limited modifications were made to the station in 2011 with the addition of ticket gate lines on both platforms and some refurbishment of the shelters. In January 2011 it was announced by Network Rail that £1.25 million would be used to rebuild the station under the Department for Transport's National Station Improvement Programme and that a further £1.6 million, from the Access for All scheme, used to install step-free access.

Work began on building the new station in November 2012 and the new ticket office opened for the first time on 14 June 2013. At this point there was still work to be completed including the installation of lifts to improve access to the subway however the opening of the new station officially took place on Friday 5 July 2013, conducted by the MD of Southern and Catherine Cassidy. Work was completed by December 2013. It was designed by engineers Sinclair Knight Merz and BPR Architects.

The station features in Sabine Baring-Gould's mid-Victorian ghost story The 9.30 Up-train.

Woodside level crossing, to the north of the station, was closed in 2021 due to safety concerns. In June 2022, an underpass was opened which replaced the level crossing.

== Services ==
Off-peak, services at Hassocks are operated by Southern and Thameslink using Class 377 and 700 EMUs.

The typical off-peak service in trains per hour is:

- 2 tph to Bedford via London Bridge
- 2 tph to London Victoria
- 2 tph to Brighton
- 2 tph to Littlehampton via Worthing

During the peak hours and on Saturdays, the service between London Victoria and Littlehampton is increased to 2 tph. There are also a number of peak hour Thameslink services to Cambridge.

In addition, the station is served by a number of peak hour Gatwick Express services which usually pass through Hassocks. These services run non-stop from Gatwick Airport to London Victoria and are operated using Class 387 EMUs.

| Preceding station | National Rail | Following station |
|---|---|---|
| Burgess Hill | Thameslink Brighton Main Line | Preston Park |
| Burgess Hill | Southern West Coastway Line | Preston Park |
| Burgess Hill | Gatwick Express Gatwick Express Peak Hours Only | Preston Park |
