= John Urpeth Rastrick =

English steam locomotive builder (1780–1856)

- Born: 26 January 1780; Morpeth, Northumberland, England
- Died: 1 November 1856 (aged 76); Chertsey, Surrey, England

John Urpeth Rastrick (26 January 1780 – 1 November 1856) was one of the first English steam locomotive builders. In partnership with James Foster, he formed Foster, Rastrick and Company, the locomotive construction company that built the Stourbridge Lion in 1829 for export to the Delaware and Hudson Railroad in America. From the 1830s he concentrated on civil engineering with his major project from 1838 being the construction of the London and Brighton Railway.

== Early years ==
Rastrick was born in Morpeth, Northumberland, to John Rastrick and Mary (Urpeth). He attended local public schools; at age 15, in 1795 he was apprenticed in his father's engineering practice. In 1802 he was hired by the Ketley Ironworks in Shropshire.

== Hazeldine & Rastrick ==
After five years at Ketley, Rastrick partnered with John Hazledine, in Bridgnorth, Shropshire.

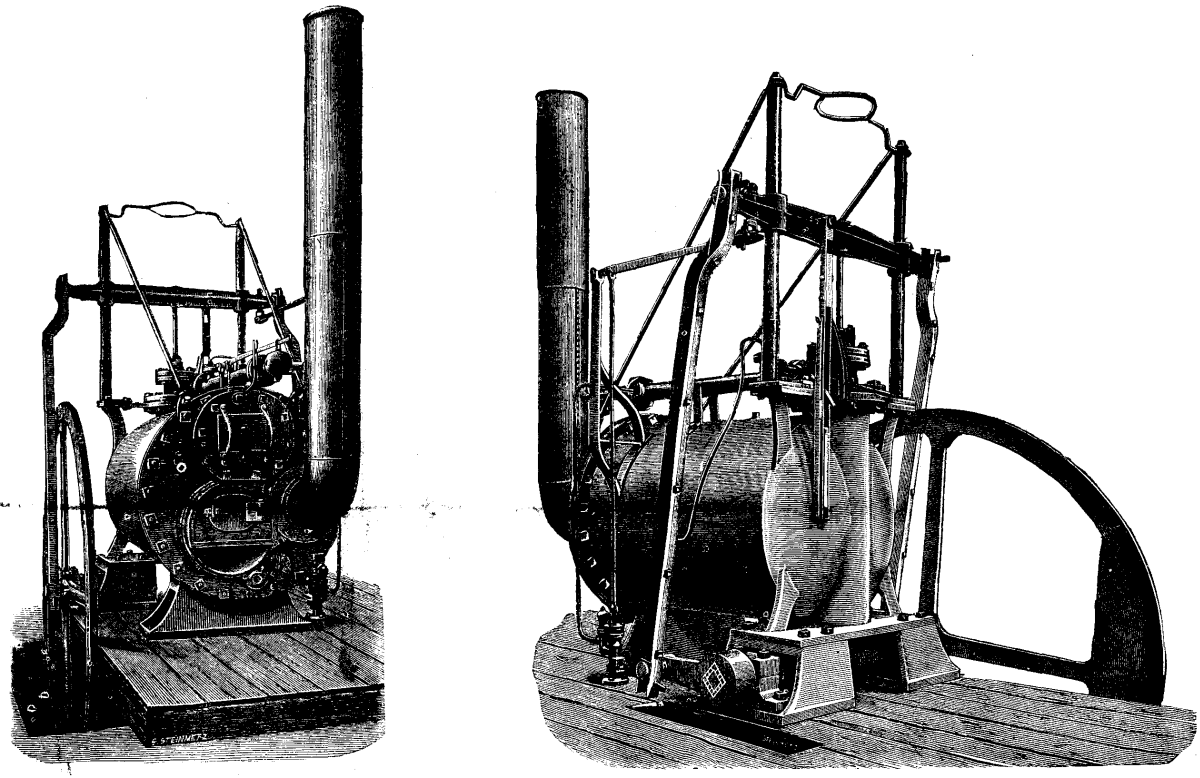
Richard Trevithick's No. 14 Engine, built by Hazledine and Co about 1804

While at Bridgnorth, Rastrick helped Richard Trevithick develop his ideas for the high pressure steam engine and locomotive, and he later testified in a parliamentary enquiry that he had built the locomotive that had been demonstrated in London in 1808. He also produced much equipment for Trevithick's abortive South American adventure.

On 1 April 1814, he was awarded UK patent number 3,799 for his steam engine design. Rastrick oversaw the construction of the Wye bridge at Chepstow, which opened in 1816. The partnership between Rastrick and Hazledine was a troubled one, ending in a dispute in 1817. He worked independently for a short period, but in 1819 he formed a partnership with James Foster, and he moved his family to Stourbridge.

== Foster Rastrick & Co. ==
The new company manufactured an extensive range of products from blast furnaces, and rolling mills, wrought iron rails, 'bearers' (beams) for some of the famous buildings of the age, etc. In 1822 Rastrick became the engineer for the Stratford and Moreton Tramway, an early horse-drawn line. The partnership was also responsible for the first steam locomotives for the Delaware and Hudson Canal Company, the Stourbridge Lion in 1829. The Stourbridge Lion was also the forerunner, and maybe considered as a prototype or proving example, for the Agenoria, the locomotive which worked on the Shut End industrial area (for James Foster) between 1829 and (around) 1860. The Agenoria is one of the prime exhibits, practically 100% complete, at the National Steam Museum in York.

=== Rainhill trials ===
In 1829 Rastrick was commissioned, with James Walker, to report on the economics of using either rope haulage or locomotives on the new Liverpool and Manchester Railway. After extensive travels to view the early railways of the age their report favoured rope haulage on economic grounds. They did however include the rider that there were some benefits to locomotive haulage, not least their probable technical improvement. Given such a marginal judgement, the directors of the company decided to hold a competition to test the locomotives on offer. Rastrick was one of three judges at the Rainhill trials of 1829 which conclusively proved the benefits of Stephenson's Rocket locomotive. Rastrick's diaries and notebook of the trial are valuable records of the performance of locomotives of that era.

== Civil engineering ==
Rastrick left the Foster, Rastrick & Co partnership in 1831 to become an independent civil engineer, and the company was dissolved. He then worked on numerous railway projects of the period and in 1835 worked with John Rennie the Younger to obtain parliamentary approval for the London and Brighton Railway. He then became consultant engineer, overseeing the railway's construction over difficult terrain. He was involved with the design and construction of the Merstham, Balcombe, Clayton and Patcham Tunnels and the Ouse Valley Viaduct along with David Mocatta (architect to the London and Brighton Railway).

He also constructed the Brighton and Chichester Railway and the Brighton Lewes and Hastings Railway which were eventually amalgamated with the London and Brighton Railway and London and Croydon Railway to form the London, Brighton and South Coast Railway. Rastrick was involved in the design of the London Road viaduct at Brighton, a viaduct at Shoreham-by-Sea, a bridge over the River Arun, and jointly in the design of a rebuilt London Bridge railway station.

Rastrick retired from active life in 1847, moving to Sayes Court, Addlestone, Chertsey in Surrey which was an eight-bedroom mansion in 25 acres (100,000 m^{2}) of grounds. His death occurred there on 1 November 1856. He is buried at Brighton Extra Mural Cemetery.

== Family ==
During his partnership with John Hazledine, Rastrick married Sarah Jervis (or Jarvis) on 24 December 1810 at Codsall, Staffordshire. He had six children: John, born 10 April 1811; Sarah, baptised 2 June 1813; Mary, baptised 30 January 1818; Henry, baptised 30 January 1818; Frederick James born c1820; George, baptised 10 June 1821.
