= Clayton Tunnel =

Railway tunnel in England

Coordinates: 50°54′46″N 0°09′14″W

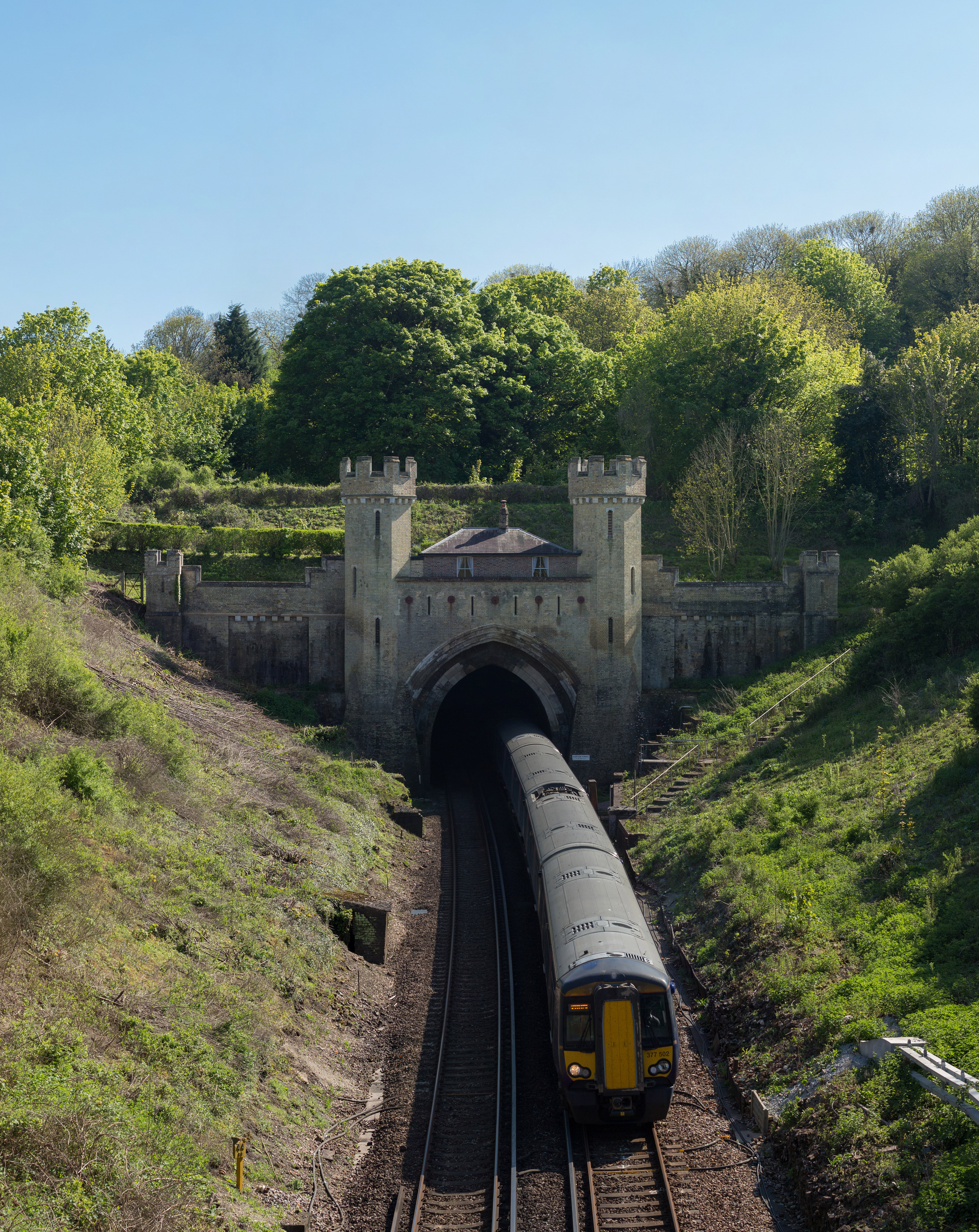
- North Portal of Clayton Tunnel
- Interactive map of Clayton Tunnel

Overview
- Location: Pyecombe, West Sussex

Operation
- Opened: 1841
- Owner: Network Rail
- Traffic: Railway
- Character: Passenger and freight

Technical
- No. of tracks: Two
- Track gauge: 1,435 mm (4 ft 8 1/2 in)

Clayton Tunnel is a railway tunnel located near the villages of Clayton and Pyecombe in West Sussex, between Hassocks and Preston Park railway stations on the Brighton Main Line. This tunnel is notable for its turreted and castellated north portal with a single-storey cottage on the top, as well as for being the site of a serious accident in 1861 which was influential in the adoption of a robust signalling system in the UK and elsewhere.

At 1 mile 499 yards (2,066 m) the Sussex Clayton Tunnel is the longest tunnel on the route. Construction of the tunnel commenced during 1839, although aspects of its design weren't approved until 1 October 1840. The accomplished tunnel builder William Hoof was the prime contractor on its construction; Clayton Tunnel was completed in 1841 after three years of work.

== Construction ==
During the 1830s, the London, Brighton and South Coast Railway (LB&SCR) set about constructing the start of its railway network in the Southern region of Great Britain. One particular engineering challenge of one of company's most important lines, which had become commonly known as the Brighton Main Line, was the hills of the South Downs; to traverse these geographical feature, the Clayton Tunnel was built. The railway's route was selected by John Urpeth Rastrick, the chief engineer of the LB&SCR. The construction of the tunnel, which was the longest such structure along the whole route, was a virtually essential part of the line, as any alternative route that avoided the use of any tunnels would have been especially circuitous and have added many miles onto each train's journey.

During 1839, a contract to undertake construction of the tunnel was awarded to William Hoof, an experienced builder of canal tunnels; it is likely that much of Clayton Tunnel's design was his work. Allegedly, the tunnel's architecture had been influenced by William Campion of nearby Danny House, Hurstpierpoint, who lived at Clayton Manor. Regardless of how the design came about, the proposal was approved by the company's board of directors on 1 October 1840. The project was not without its critics: the Brighton Guardian, a local newspaper, was sceptical and publicly doubted that it was even possible to construct such a tunnel, suggesting that the line would need to be diverted to avoid the South Downs entirely. Even more supportive coverage recognised the engineering challenges presented, but acknowledged the competency of the team involved.

During the tunnel's construction bricks were manufactured on site, with the material being gathered from purchased lands nearby; both the tunnel lining and portals were largely composed of this locally sourced brick. An unusual feature of the tunnel was the incorporation of gas lighting, using gas from a retort at Merstham. While this was meant to make the tunnel more tolerable for passengers, the trains themselves would snuff them out and required constant relighting by the tunnel keeper, and thus their use was soon discontinued.

== North portal ==
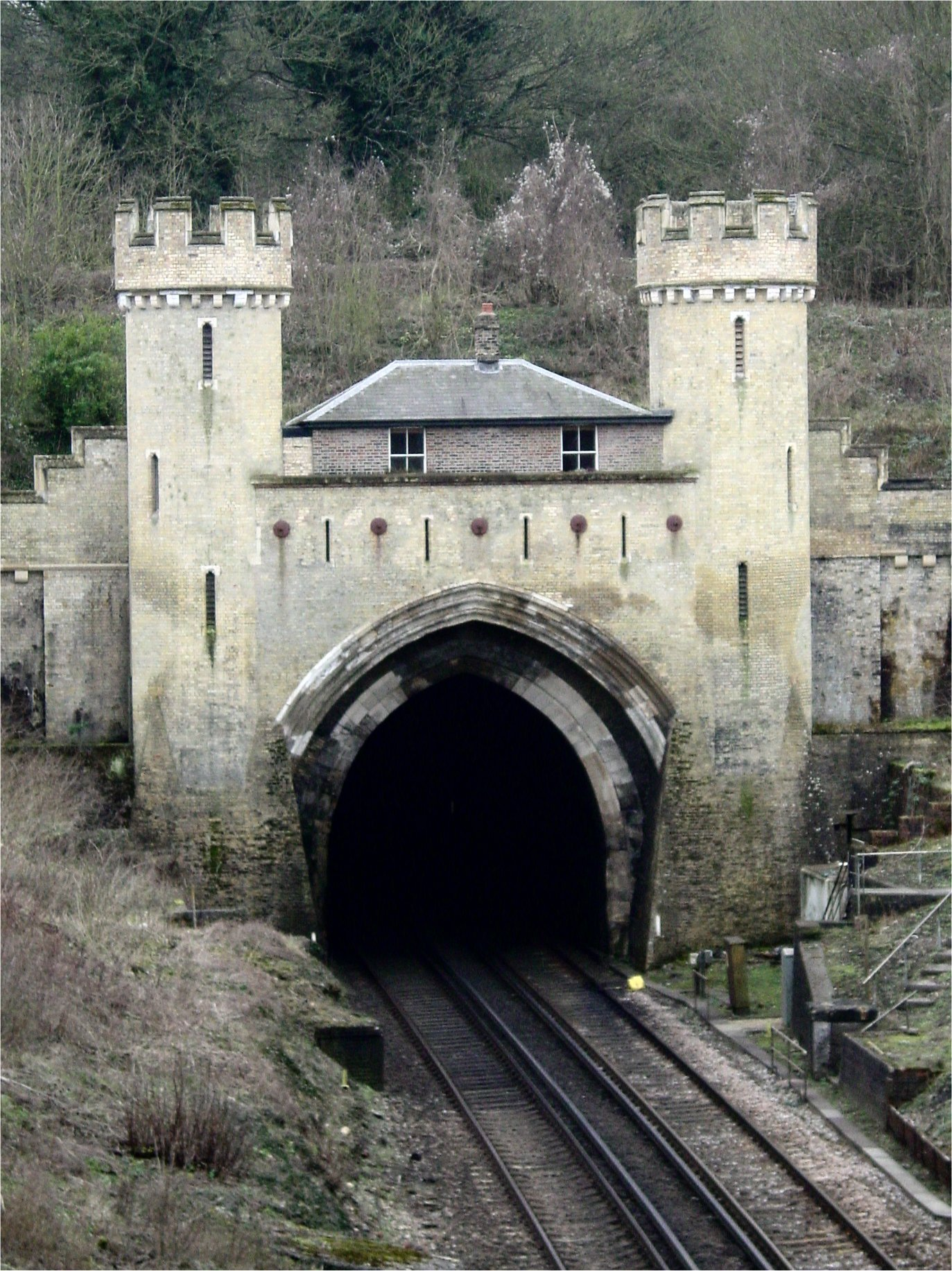
The northern portal of Clayton Tunnel

The listed north portal of Clayton Tunnel features a complex and distinctive design, being turreted and castellated. In comparison, the south portal of the tunnel is relatively unremarkable and is unlisted. It is uncertain as to which individuals were responsible for its design; it has been suggested that the north portal was only designed as the tunnel neared completion. Plans were submitted at that time by chief engineer John Rastrick: It has been speculated that Rastrick had designed the northern portal, or that he had done so jointly with his sub-contractor, William Hoof, or that Hoof alone had done so. The company's architect at the time was David Mocatta, but author David Cole has declared that there was nothing of substance connecting Mocatta to the endeavour, and noted Mocatta's general distaste for gothic architecture as a further reason against his involvement.

Large octagonal turrets that stand tall in the cutting are either side of the portal. During 1849, these towers were converted for use by the line's signalmen. A further feature of the north portal is its attached single-storey cottage, which is perched directly over the line, which has been described as being one of the more unusual and photogenic railway locations in the UK. This cottage, which is built in contrasting red brick and sits curiously off-centre, was added in 1849 at a cost of £70. It was originally used to house the tunnel's care taker and his family. It is presently a private dwelling as well as being a Grade II listed building, having been designated as such on 11 May 1983.

== Accident ==
The West Sussex tunnel was the site of an early form of "automatic" signal invented by CF Whitworth. Far from being automatic in operation, this was merely a signal that was operated by the signalman on duty but that returned to 'danger' once the train had passed, by means of a treadle. Clayton Tunnel had such a signal at each end, and it was the failure of the signalman to ensure that the signal had returned to danger that led to the worst ever accident on that line on 25 August 1861.

Three trains left Brighton within a very short time. Having signalled one train correctly, the signalman at the southern portal manually returned the signal to danger too late for the second train, but was unaware that his attempts to alert its driver by waving a flag had been successful. The second train stopped well inside the tunnel, and as it was slowly reversing towards him the signaller misunderstood a 'tunnel clear' message from the north box as indicating that the second train had cleared the tunnel when it in it fact referring to the first. The signaller then allowed the third train to enter the tunnel, colliding with the reversing second train with the loss of 23 lives and 176 injured.

== See also ==
- List of tunnels in the United Kingdom
