= Balcombe tunnel =

Railway tunnel in West Sussex, England

Coordinates: 51.072131°N 0.15251°W

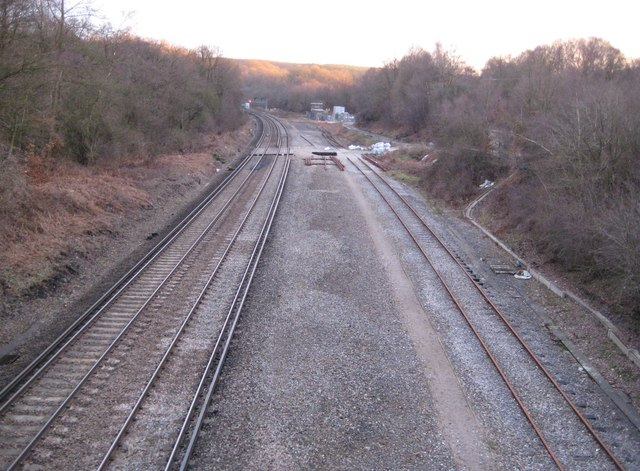
Northern approach to Balcombe tunnel

Balcombe tunnel is a railway tunnel on the Brighton Main Line through the Sussex Weald between Three Bridges and Balcombe. It is 1,034 metres (1,131 yards) long. The track is electrified with a 750 V DC third-rail.

== History ==
The tunnel was constructed by the London and Brighton Railway between 1838 and 1841, through Grinstead Clay, with five ventilation shafts. The engineer for the line was John Urpeth Rastrick; the contractor responsible for the brick-lined tunnel is not known. Ingress of water from the ground above was experienced during the construction of the tunnel, and this has remained a problem throughout its history. Rastrick described the tunnelling as very treacherous, requiring great caution on the part of the miners working it, as "it swells and effloresces as soon as exposed to the air." Between 1907 and 1909 the tunnel was partially relined with engineering brick.

Galvanised iron sheets were fitted to prevent the water falling on passengers in open carriages, but the blast from the steam locomotives and air pressure created by the passage of trains could result in the metal sheets being torn from the structure, creating a serious hazard. Thereafter drivers were warned about the hazard presented by hanging icicles.

The "railway murderer" Percy Lefroy Mapleton left the body of his victim Isaac Gold, whom he had robbed, in Balcombe tunnel in 1881.

In July 1903 plans were finalised for the boring of a second Balcombe tunnel as part of the scheme to quadruple the Brighton Main Line throughout, but these were never implemented.

In 1998/9 catchment trays were fitted under the tunnel's ventilation shafts to divert seeping ground water from the shafts into the track drainage system, with a sixth added in 2006/7. The trays consisted of steel decking, gutters and flashings which were installed under limited track possessions. The tray supports had failed by 2013, requiring the installation of additional support brackets, and the Office of Rail Regulation enforced improvements in tunnel examination procedures.

In 2018 and 2019, works were carried out to improve the tunnel, carrying out significant works on the drainage system, as well as replacing switches and crossings at Balcombe tunnel junction, as a part of wider works along the Brighton Mainline.

== Views ==
North portal - see http://www.safeguardeurope.com/case_studies/tunnel_waterproofing_balcombe.php
Aerial view - see http://wikimapia.org/7962596/Balcombe-Tunnel
Junction works timelapse video - see https://www.youtube.com/watch?v=hVsKl3fiquQ
