= Brighton Main Line =

Railway line between London and Brighton

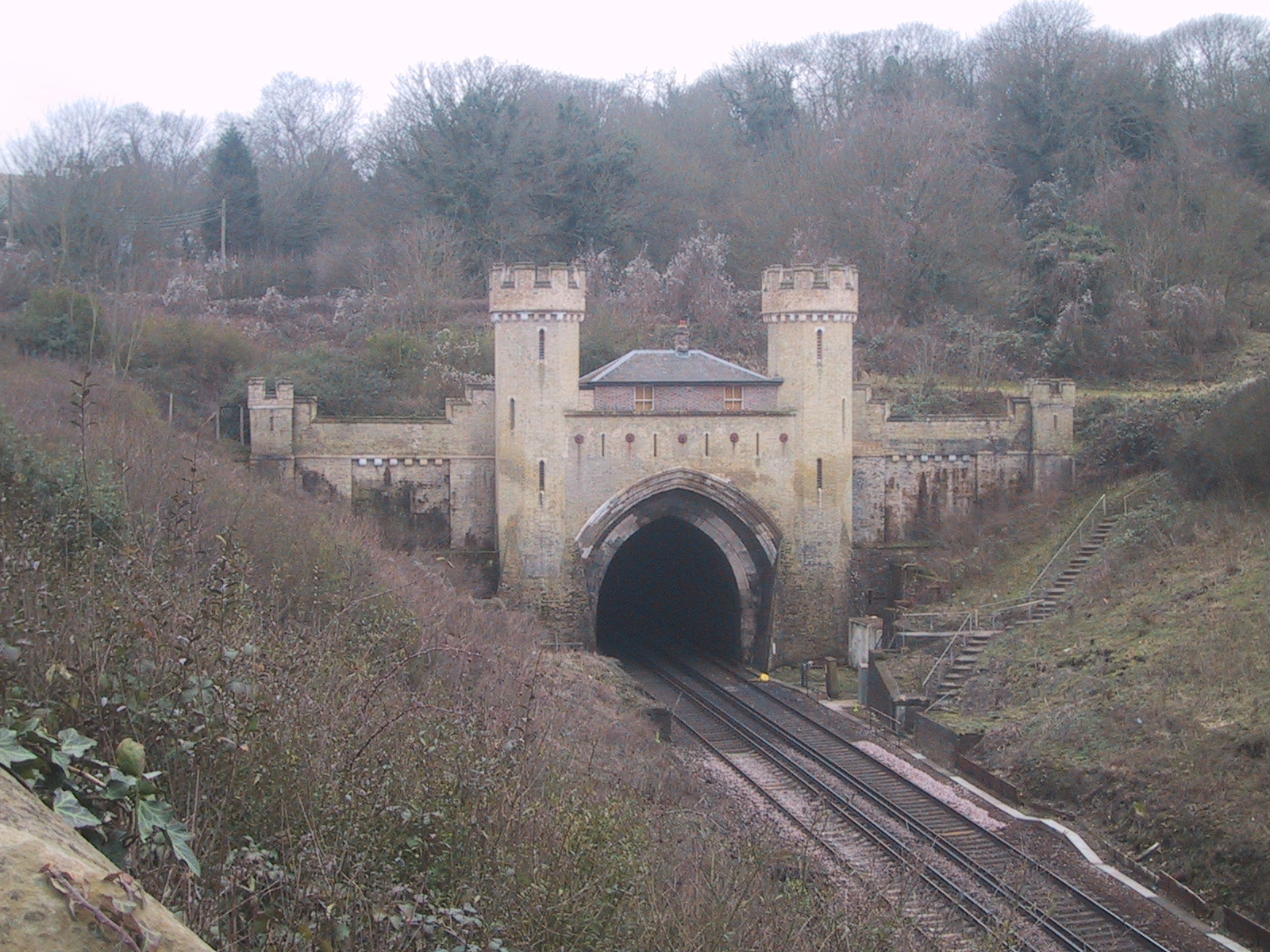
- Clayton Tunnel, one of the most notable structures on the line

Overview
- Status: Operational
- Owner: Network Rail
- Locale: Greater London; South East England
- Termini: London Victoria, London Bridge, Brighton
- Stations: 37

Service
- Type: Regional rail, Suburban rail
- System: National Rail
- Operator(s): Govia Thameslink Railway; Great Western Railway; London Overground
- Depot(s): Stewarts Lane, Selhurst, Brighton
- Rolling stock: Class 165 "Turbo"; Class 166 "Turbo Express"; Class 171 "Turbostar"; Class 377 "Electrostar"; Class 378 "Capitalstar"; Class 387 "Electrostar"; Class 700 "Desiro City"

History
- Opened: 1839–1862

Technical
- Number of tracks: 2-5
- Track gauge: 4 ft 8 1/2 in (1,435 mm) standard gauge
- Electrification: 750 V DC third rail
- Operating speed: Max. 90 mph (140 km/h)
Route map
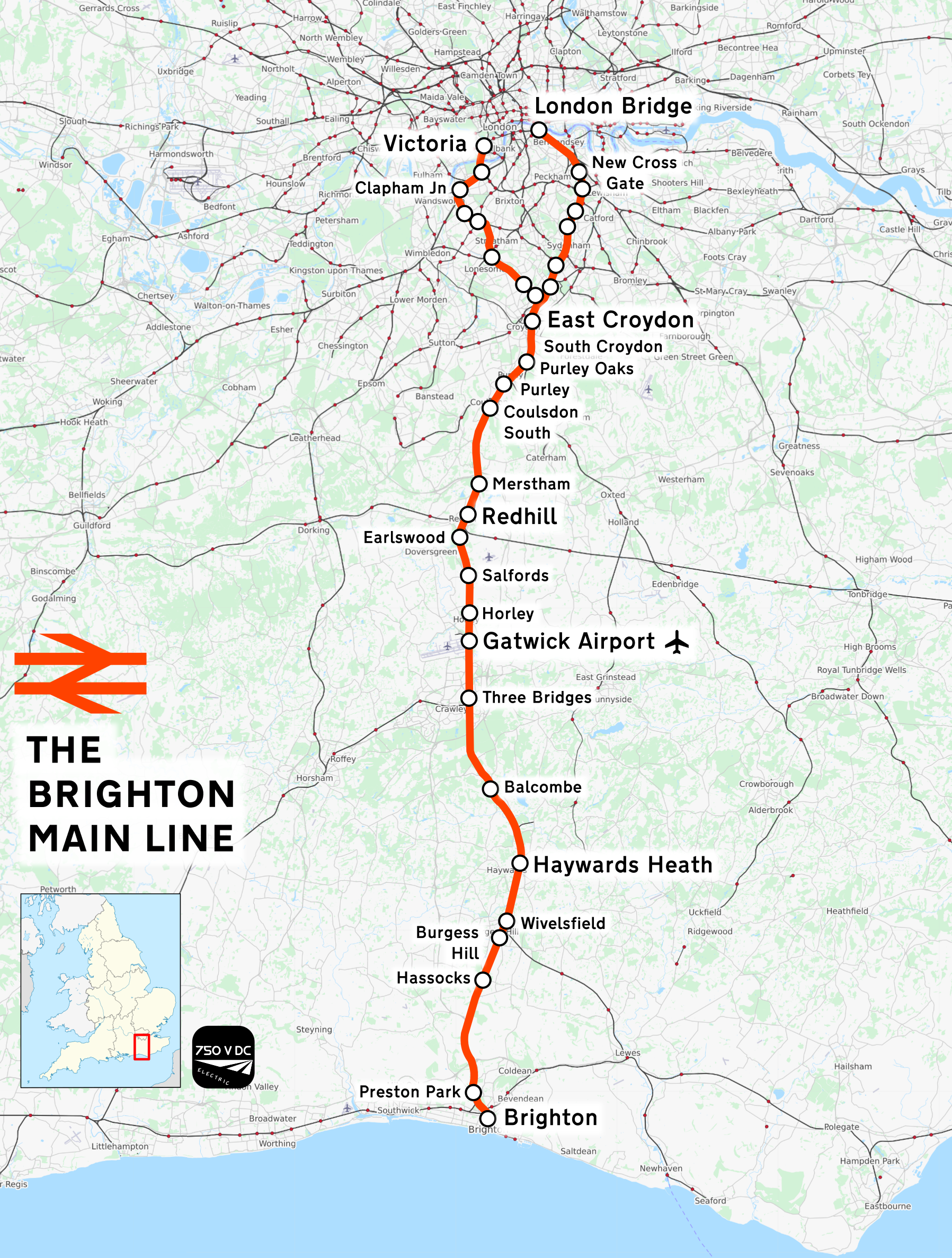

The Brighton Main Line is a railway line in southern England linking London to Brighton. It starts at two termini in the capital, London Victoria and London Bridge, and the branches from each meet at East Croydon, from where the route continues southwards via Gatwick Airport to the coast. The line serves the suburbs of South London, as well as the towns of Redhill, Horley, Crawley, Haywards Heath and Burgess Hill.

The distance from the London termini to Brighton is around 50 mi (80 km) and the fastest end-to-end journey time is about an hour. A variety of passenger services runs on the line, including limited-stop airport expresses, semi-fast regional and outer-suburban trains, and shorter-distance commuter services. These are operated by Govia Thameslink Railway (Gatwick Express, Southern and Thameslink) (Note: Gatwick Express, Southern and Thameslink are (along with Great Northern), all sub-brands of Govia Thameslink Railway (GTR).), Transport for London (London Overground) and Great Western Railway.

The first part of the Brighton Main Line to be built was the section from London Bridge to Croydon, which was opened by the London and Croydon Railway (L&CR) in 1839. Two years later, a separate company, the London and Brighton Railway (L&BR), extended the line to the south coast. In 1846, the L&CR and the L&BR merged to form the London, Brighton and South Coast Railway (LB&SCR), which began to run trains to London Victoria via the West End of London and Crystal Palace Railway in 1848. The Brighton Main Line was completed in December 1862, when the LB&SCR opened the direct route between Croydon and Victoria via Thornton Heath.

The Brighton Main Line is electrified using the 750 V DC third-rail system and the majority of the route has four tracks. There are seven tunnels, including two on the Quarry Line, which allows express services to bypass the junctions at Redhill station. The most serious accident on the Brighton Main Line occurred in October 1947, when two trains collided in fog near South Croydon station, killing 32 people. The listed structures on the route include the Ouse Valley Viaduct, the north portal of Clayton Tunnel and all three termini.

== Route ==
=== Overview ===
The Brighton Main Line is a railway line in southern England. It links the capital to Brighton and passes through Greater London, Surrey and West Sussex. It serves Gatwick Airport and the towns of Redhill, Horley, Crawley, Haywards Heath and Burgess Hill, as well as the South London suburbs. The line starts at two central London termini: the western branch runs from London Victoria while the eastern branch originates at London Bridge. The two branches join at Windmill Bridge Junction, to the north of East Croydon station. The distance from London Victoria to Brighton is around 50 mi (80 km) (Note: The Sectional Appendix published by Network Rail in 2009 uses London Victoria as the datum point for the Brighton Main Line and gives a mileage of 50 mi 49 ch (81.5 km) for Brighton station. However, there are changes in mileage on both the fast (Quarry Line) and slow lines on the south side of Redhill station and also on the slow lines at Coulsdon North. This means that the total distance from Victoria to Brighton via the Quarry Line is 50 mi 55 ch (81.6 km) and via Redhill is 9 ch (590 ft; 180 m) shorter. The distance from London Bridge to Brighton via the Quarry Line is 50 mi 32 ch (81.1 km) and via Redhill is 50 mi 23 ch (80.9 km).) and the line is electrified using the 750 V DC third-rail system.

=== London Victoria to Windmill Bridge Junction ===
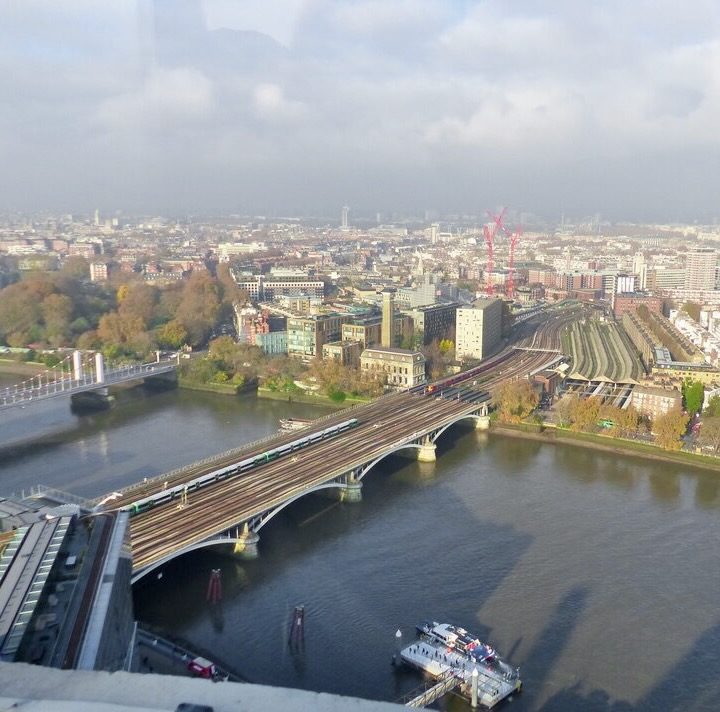
Grosvenor Bridge carries the Brighton Main Line over the River Thames between London Victoria and Battersea Park

The London Victoria to Windmill Bridge Junction section of the Brighton Main Line is 10 mi 2 ch (16.1 km) in length and has nine stations in total. Victoria and Clapham Junction stations are managed by Network Rail and have 19 and 17 operational platforms respectively. (Note: Although London Victoria has a total of 19 platforms, only platforms 9-19 are connected to the Brighton Main Line. Platforms 9-12 are typically used for slow line services, platforms 13 and 14 are used by Gatwick Express and platforms 15-19 are for fast line services. Clapham Junction has a total of 19 operational platforms, but only platforms 12-17 are connected to the Brighton Main Line.) The other stations (Battersea Park, Wandsworth Common, Balham, Streatham Common, Norbury, Thornton Heath and Selhurst) are managed by Southern and have four operational platforms each. Train services that use this section of the Brighton Main Line are:

- Victoria to Gatwick Airport and Brighton services, operated by Gatwick Express
- Victoria to East Grinstead, Reigate and the South Coast, operated by Southern
- Suburban services from Victoria via Sutton or Streatham Hill, operated by Southern
- London Bridge to East Croydon stopping services via Norbury, operated by Southern
- Hemel Hempstead to East Croydon via Kensington (Olympia), operated by Southern

With the exception of the line between Victoria and Battersea Park, this part of the Brighton Main Line has four parallel tracks. The fast lines for longer-distance express services are on the western side of the formation and the slow lines are to the east. In general fast services stop at Victoria and Clapham Junction and do not make scheduled calls at the other stations. The maximum permitted speed is 70 mph (110 km/h) on the fast lines and 60 mph (97 km/h) on the slow lines. Signalling is controlled from Three Bridges rail operating centre.

Stations from London Victoria to Windmill Bridge Junction (ordered from north to south)
| Station | Distance from London Victoria | Number of platforms | Opening date | Original name | Ref. |
|---|---|---|---|---|---|
| London Victoria | 0 mi 00 ch (0 km) | 19 (10 for main line) | 1 October 1860 | | |
| Battersea Park | 1 mi 23 ch (2.1 km) | 4 (3 for main line) | 1 May 1857 | Coulsdon | |
| Clapham Junction | 2 mi 57 ch (4.4 km) | 17 (6 for main line) | 2 March 1863 | | |
| Wandsworth Common | 4 mi 05 ch (6.5 km) | 4 | 1 December 1856 | | |
| Balham | 4 mi 52 ch (7.5 km) | 4 | 1 December 1856 | | |
| Streatham Common | 6 mi 48 ch (10.6 km) | 4 | 1 December 1862 | | |
| Norbury | 7 mi 36 ch (12.0 km) | 4 | 1 January 1878 | Norbury Hill | |
| Thornton Heath | 8 mi 64 ch (14.2 km) | 4 | 12 July 1841 | | |
| Selhurst | 9 mi 31 ch (15.1 km) | 4 | 1 May 1865 | | |

=== London Bridge to Windmill Bridge Junction ===
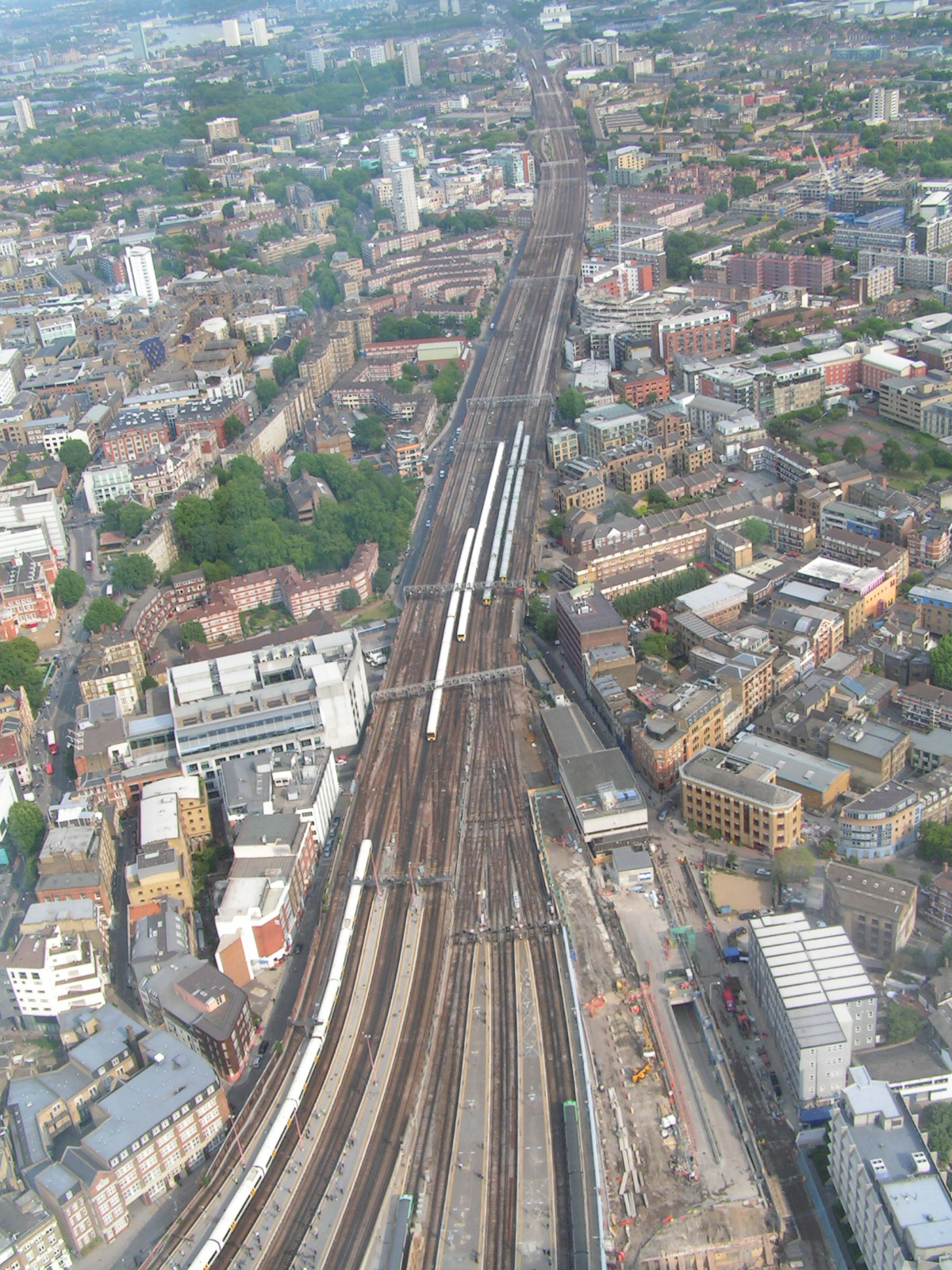
The approach to London Bridge station looking eastwards: The Brighton Main Line tracks are on the right hand side (south side) of the formation.

The London Bridge to Windmill Bridge Junction section of the Brighton Main Line is 9 mi 61 ch (15.7 km) in length and has nine stations in total. London Bridge station is managed by Network Rail and has 15 platforms. All other stations (New Cross Gate, Brockley, Honor Oak Park, Forest Hill, Sydenham, Penge West, Anerley and Selhurst) are managed by London Overground. Both New Cross Gate and Norwood Junction have five operational platforms, but the intermediate stations have two platforms each, which serve the slow lines only. Train services that use this section of the Brighton Main Line are:

- Thameslink services to destinations in Sussex (including Brighton, Horsham and East Grinstead)
- Outer suburban services from London Bridge to destinations in Surrey (including Epsom, Caterham and Tattenham Corner) operated by Southern
- Victoria–London Bridge and Victoria–West Croydon via Crystal Palace, operated by Southern
- London Bridge–Uckfield, operated by Southern
- London Overground Windrush line services to Crystal Palace and West Croydon

The Brighton Main Line between London Bridge and Windmill Bridge Junction has four parallel tracks. The fast lines for longer-distance express services are in the centre of the formation and the slow lines are to the outside. The maximum permitted speed is 70 mph (110 km/h) on the fast lines and 60 mph (97 km/h) on the slow lines. Signalling is controlled from Three Bridges rail operating centre.

Stations from London Bridge to Windmill Bridge Junction (ordered from north to south)
| Station | Distance from London Bridge | Number of platforms | Opening date | Original name | Ref. |
|---|---|---|---|---|---|
| London Bridge | 0 mi 00 ch (0 km) | 15 (6 for main line) | 1 December 1836 | | |
| New Cross Gate | 2 mi 70 ch (4.6 km) | 5 | 5 June 1839 | New Cross | |
| Brockley | 3 mi 56 ch (6.0 km) | 2 | 6 March 1871 | | |
| Honor Oak Park | 4 mi 59 ch (7.6 km) | 2 | 1 April 1886 | | |
| Forest Hill | 5 mi 50 ch (9.1 km) | 2 | 5 June 1839 | Dartmouth Arms | |
| Sydenham | 6 mi 32 ch (10.3 km) | 2 | 5 June 1839 | | |
| Penge West | 7 mi 15 ch (11.6 km) | 2 | 5 June 1839 | Penge | |
| Anerley | 7 mi 47 ch (12.2 km) | 2 | 5 June 1839 | Anerley Bridge | |
| Norwood Junction | 8 mi 55 ch (14.0 km) | 2 | 5 June 1839 | Jolly Sailor | |

=== Windmill Bridge Junction to Balcombe Tunnel Junction ===
The north Croydon area showing: Selhurst station (red circle) on the line to London Victoria (top left); the line to London Bridge (top right); the line to West Croydon (bottom left); the line to Brighton via East Croydon (bottom centre).

The Brighton Main Line between Windmill Bridge Junction and Balcombe Tunnel Junction is 21 mi 26 ch (34.3 km) long and has twelve stations in total. Gatwick Airport station is managed by Gatwick Express, but the other stations are managed by Southern. Gatwick Airport has seven operational platforms, East Croydon and Purley have six, South Croydon and Three Bridges have five, Purley Oaks, Redhill and Horley have four, and the remaining stations (Coulsdon South, Merstham, Earlswood and Salfords) have two platforms each. Train services that use this section of the Brighton Main Line are:

- Thameslink services to destinations in Sussex (including Brighton, Horsham and East Grinstead)
- Outer suburban services from London Bridge to Caterham and Tattenham Corner, operated by Southern
- Victoria to East Grinstead, Reigate and the South Coast, operated by Southern
- London Bridge to Uckfield, operated by Southern
- Hemel Hempstead to East Croydon via Kensington (Olympia), operated by Southern
- Victoria to Gatwick Airport and Brighton, operated by Gatwick Express
- Reading to Gatwick Airport via Guildford, operated by Great Western Railway

Between Windmill Bridge Junction and South Croydon there are five parallel tracks, but for the remainder of this section there are four parallel tracks. Between Stoats Nest Junction and the south of Redhill station, the fast and slow lines diverge. The fast tracks are generally known as the Quarry Line, which provides a bypass route to avoid the junctions at Redhill. There are changes in track mileage on both the fast and slow lines to the south of Redhill. The maximum speed on this section of the Brighton Main Line is 90 mph (140 km/h).

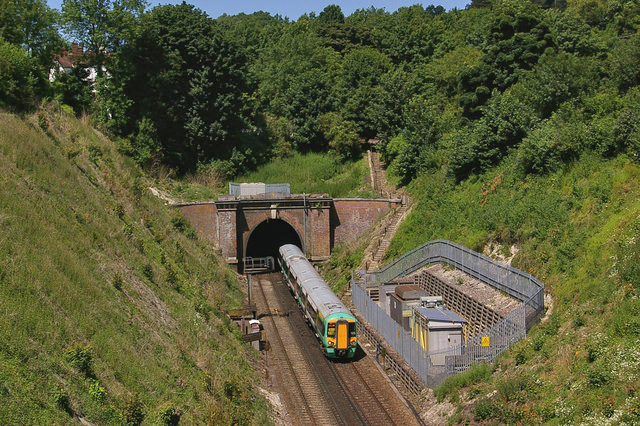
South portal of Merstham Tunnel

The Brighton Main Line passes in tunnel beneath the North Downs. The slow lines run through the 1 mi 71 yd (1.674 km) Merstham Tunnel and the fast lines pass through the longer, 1 mi 353 yd (1.932 km) Quarry Tunnel. There is one additional tunnel on the Quarry Line, Redhill Tunnel, which is 649 yd (593 m) long.

Stations from Windmill Bridge Junction to Balcombe Tunnel Junction (ordered from north to south)
| Station | Distance from London Victoria | Number of platforms | Opening date | Original name | Ref. |
|---|---|---|---|---|---|
| East Croydon | 10 mi 28 ch (16.7 km) | 6 | 12 July 1841 | Croydon | |
| South Croydon | 11 mi 21 ch (18.1 km) | 5 | 1 September 1865 | | |
| Purley Oaks | 12 mi 34 ch (20.0 km) | 4 | 5 November 1899 | | |
| Purley | 13 mi 29 ch (21.5 km) | 6 (4 for main line) | 12 July 1841 | Godstone Road | |
| Coulsdon South | 17 mi 03 ch (27.4 km) | 2 | 1 October 1889 | Coulsdon | |
| Merstham | 20 mi 59 ch (33.4 km) | 2 | 12 July 1841 | | |
| Redhill | 22 mi 40 ch (36.2 km) | 4 | 15 April 1844 | Reigate | |
| Earlswood | 21 mi 50 ch (34.8 km) | 2 | 30 April 1849 | | |
| Salfords | 23 mi 37 ch (37.8 km) | 2 | 8 October 1915 | | |
| Horley | 25 mi 60 ch (41.4 km) | 4 | 12 July 1841 | | |
| Gatwick Airport | 26 mi 47 ch (42.8 km) | 7 | 28 May 1958 | | |
| Three Bridges | 29 mi 21 ch (47.1 km) | 5 (4 for main line) | 12 July 1841 | | |

=== Balcombe Tunnel Junction to Brighton ===
The section of the Brighton Main Line from Balcombe Tunnel Junction to Brighton is 19 mi 21 ch (31.0 km) long. All seven stations on this section are managed by Southern. Brighton has eight platforms, of which six are connected to the Brighton Main Line. Haywards Heath has four platforms and Preston Park has three. The other four stations (Balcombe, Wivelsfield, Burgess Hill and Hassocks) have two operational platforms each. Train services that use this section of the Brighton Main Line are:

- Thameslink services to Brighton
- Victoria to the South Coast, operated by Southern
- Victoria to Brighton, operated by Gatwick Express

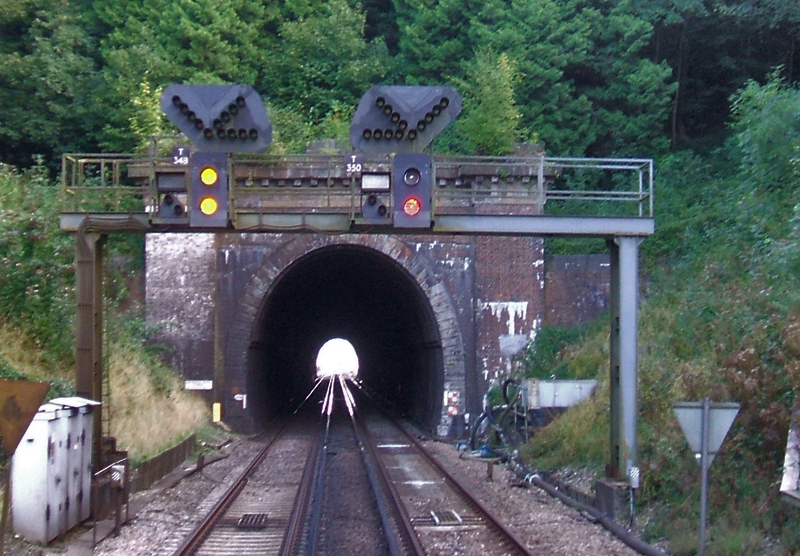
The approach to Haywards Heath Tunnel is signalled for bi-directional working.

Between Balcombe Tunnel Junction and Brighton, the Brighton Main Line generally has two tracks, signalled for bi-directional working. There are short three- and four-track sections at Preston Park and Haywards Heath stations respectively. The maximum line speed is 90 mph (140 km/h).

There are four tunnels on this section of the line: Balcombe tunnel is 1,141 yd (1,043 m) long; Haywards Heath Tunnel is 249 yd (228 m) long; Clayton Tunnel, at the summit of the line, is 1 mi 499 yd (2.066 km) long; Patcham Tunnel is 1 mi 492 yd (2.059 km) long. There are two viaducts on this part of the Brighton Main Line: The 22 ch (1,500 ft; 440 m) Ouse Valley Viaduct crosses the River Ouse on 37 brick arches and the shorter Vale Viaduct is 3.5 ch (230 ft; 70 m) long.

Stations from Balcombe Tunnel Junction to Brighton (ordered from north to south)
| Station | Distance from London Victoria | Number of platforms | Opening date | Original name | Ref. |
|---|---|---|---|---|---|
| Balcombe | 33 mi 64 ch (54.4 km) | 2 | 12 July 1841 | | |
| Haywards Heath | 37 mi 59 ch (60.7 km) | 4 | 12 July 1841 | | |
| Wivelsfield | 40 mi 52 ch (65.4 km) | 2 | 1 August 1886 | Keymer Junction | |
| Burgess Hill | 41 mi 39 ch (66.8 km) | 2 | January 1842 (Note: Burgess Hill station is first recorded in newspaper advertisements on 27 January 1842, but the exact date of opening is unknown.) | | |
| Hassocks | 43 mi 42 ch (70.0 km) | 2 | 21 September 1841 | Hassocks Gate | |
| Preston Park | 49 mi 21 ch (79.3 km) | 3 | 1 November 1869 | Preston | |
| Brighton | 50 mi 49 ch (81.5 km) | 8 (6 for main line) | 12 May 1840 | | |

== History ==
=== London and Croydon Railway (1834–1846) ===
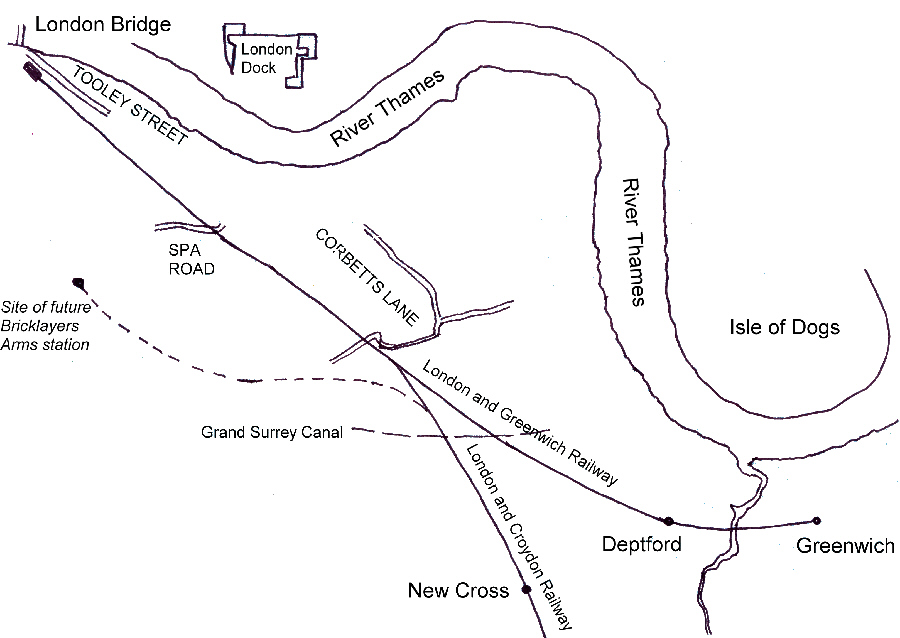
The junction between the London and Greenwich Railway and the London and Croydon Railway to the east of London Bridge in 1840

The first part of the Brighton Main Line to be constructed was the section between London Bridge and Croydon. It was proposed in 1834 by the London and Croydon Railway (L&CR) company. Much of the route, surveyed by Joseph Gibbs, followed the course of the Croydon Canal, the southern terminus of which would be used for Croydon station (now West Croydon). (Note: The Croydon Canal closed on 22 August 1836. Its route was followed by the London and Croydon Railway (L&CR) between New Cross and West Croydon. Only the southernmost part of the line was directly laid over the course of the former canal. For the remainder, the L&CR followed the general corridor of the waterway. Several sections of canal that were not built over were deliberately retained (some were even stocked with fish) in the hope that they would attract potential residents to new housing developments.) The line would diverge from the London and Greenwich Railway (L&GR) around 1.75 mi (2.82 km) east of London Bridge station and the L&CR would have running powers into the terminus.

Passenger trains began running on the L&GR between Deptford and its temporary London terminus at Spa Road on 8 February 1835. London Bridge station, the first permanent terminus in the capital, opened on 14 December the following year. The L&CR was authorised by act of parliament on 12 June 1835 and a second act, permitting the company to build its own terminus at London Bridge, was given royal assent on 14 July 1836. (Note: The London and Croydon Railway's London Bridge terminus was to the north of that of the London and Greenwich Railway. The two companies swapped stations in 1844.) The line between the capital and Croydon was built by the engineer, William Cubitt, and construction began in 1838. The cost of the line was originally estimated to be around £400,000, but difficulties encountered during the excavation of the cutting at New Cross, meant that an additional £216,000 was required. The route originally surveyed by Gibbs was also modified to ease curves and to reduce the maximum gradient from 1 in 80 to 1 in 100.

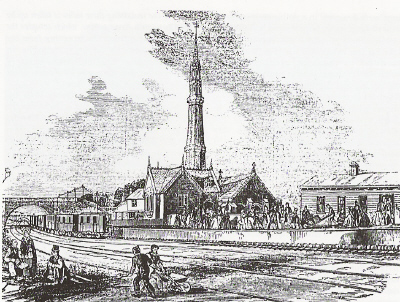
Jolly Sailor station (now Norwood Junction) in 1845

The official opening ceremony for the L&CR took place on 1 June 1839, although passenger trains for the general public did not start until four days later. Since the area between New Cross and Croydon was sparsely populated and largely undeveloped countryside, the majority of passenger journeys on the line were between the two termini. Nevertheless, when the line opened, intermediate stations were provided at New Cross (now New Cross Gate), Dartmouth Arms (now Forest Hill), Sydenham, Penge (now Penge West), Anerley Bridge (now Anerley) and Jolly Sailor (now Norwood Junction). Initially nine steam locomotives operated on the line: five Sharp, Roberts and Co. and two J. and G. Rennie 2-2-2 engines were used to haul trains and two 0-4-2 locomotives were used as banking engines for the steep climb to New Cross from the junction with the L&GR.

=== London and Brighton Railway (1837–1846) ===
In the early 1830s, several different routes for a railway between London and Brighton were proposed. John Rennie the Younger favoured a line via Merstham and Horley, while the engineers Robert Stephenson and Nicholas Cundy preferred longer, but cheaper routes via Dorking and Shoreham-by-Sea. The London and Brighton Railway (L&BR) company, formed to promote Rennie's more direct route, received parliamentary approval for its scheme on 15 July 1837. The line was to leave the L&CR about a mile from its southern terminus, to head southwards towards Brighton. The L&BR purchased the defunct Croydon, Merstham and Godstone Railway in order to use part of its abandoned trackbed for the new railway.

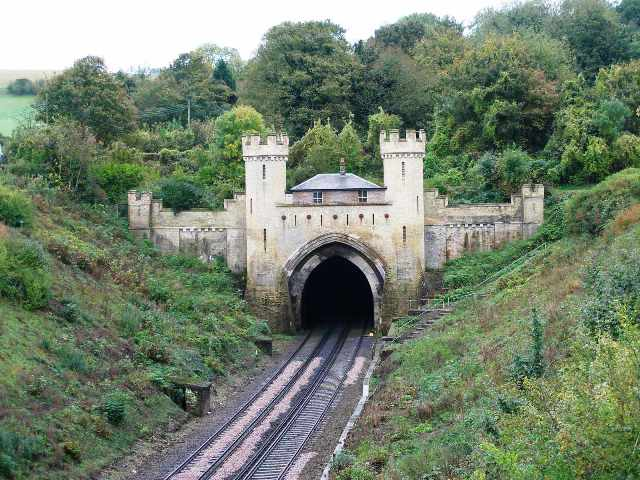
The northern portal of Clayton Tunnel is constructed in the style of a medieval castle.

The first construction contracts were let in 1838 and the first track was laid at Hassocks on 4 February the following year. The engineer was John Urpeth Rastrick and the stations were designed by David Mocatta. In total, around 6000 navvies are thought to have worked to build the railway. The line, which required five tunnels and a viaduct over the Ouse valley, cost £2.63M (around £57,000 per mile). Completion was delayed due to bad weather during the winter of 1840-41 and the first section, from Croydon to Haywards Heath, did not open until 12 July 1841. The initial timetable included four trains each way on weekdays between the capital and Haywards Heath, with intermediate calls at Redhill, Horley and Three Bridges (calls were made at other stations on request). The journey time was two hours from London and a coach, taking a further two hours to reach Brighton, was provided for onward travel.

The final section of the Brighton Main Line, between Haywards Heath and Brighton, opened on 21 September 1841. The initial service on the whole line was six trains per day in each direction, with most trains taking 2 1/4 hours to complete the journey and one non-stop service in each direction taking 1 3/4 hours. The station at Merstham opened on 1 December 1841, but was closed two years later. A station was opened at Stoats Nest (later Coulsdon North) in the spring of 1842 to cater for racegoers at Epsom. Work to widen the shared section of the L&GR viaduct was completed on 10 May that year. The new L&CR London Bridge station, designed by Henry Roberts, opened in 1844. Since the new terminus was not designed to handle freight, a spur line primarily for goods trains was built to Bricklayers Arms and opened on 1 May that year. (Note: Although Bricklayers Arms was primarily intended to handle freight, it also provided a stopping place for coaches and so passenger trains were also run to the station although London Bridge remained the primary terminus for the capital.)

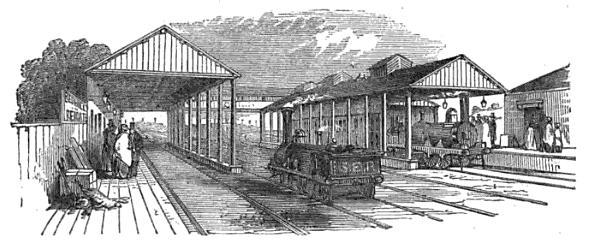
Redhill station c. 1853: The station was moved to its current location by the South Eastern Railway in 1844.

The South Eastern Railway (SER) company was formed to promote a railway from London to Dover. Under the terms of the act of parliament passed on 21 June 1836, the company was empowered to build a line that left the L&CR at Penge, but the following year, parliament permitted the company to instead form a connection to the L&BR at Redhill. The Redhill to Tonbridge section of the SER opened on 26 May 1842. In 1839, anticipating that disputes might arise over the use of the line north of Redhill, parliament instructed the L&BR to sell the Coulsdon–Redhill section to the SER. A price of £340,000 was agreed and the transfer of ownership took place in July 1845.

On 27 July 1846, parliamentary authority was granted to merge the L&CR and L&BR to form the London, Brighton and South Coast Railway (LB&SCR).

=== London, Brighton and South Coast Railway (1846–1922) ===
A branch line from Sydenham to Crystal Palace was opened on 10 June 1854 by the West End of London and Crystal Palace Railway (WELCPR). The company extended its line to Balham on 1 December 1856 and to Pimlico in March 1858. A west–south spur linking Crystal Palace and Norwood Junction stations was opened in 1857, allowing trains from Brighton to reach the Pimlico terminus. The LB&SCR purchased the WELCPR in 1859. In 1860, the Victoria Station and Pimlico Railway constructed Grosvenor Bridge across the River Thames, opening Victoria station on 1 October that year. (Note: The Victoria Station and Pimlico Railway was authorised by act of parliament on 23 July 1858. The new terminus station, London Victoria, was built on the site of the former Grosvenor Canal basin.)

Although LB&SCR trains could access Victoria station via Crystal Palace, John Rastrick advised that a shorter route to the West End of London would be "most desirable". The company therefore decided to build a "cut-off" line between Croydon and Balham via Streatham Common. The proposal was authorised by parliament on 3 July 1860 and the new double-track line opened on 1 December 1862 with intermediate stations at Thornton Heath and Streatham Common. (Note: An independent proposal for a line linking East Croydon to Wandsworth Common had been presented to parliament in 1851, but had been withdrawn the following year.) A further act of parliament was passed on 18 July 1864 authorising a link between the Victoria and London Bridge arms of the Brighton Main Line that allowed trains to travel between Norwood Junction and Thornton Heath without a reversal. Selhurst station, on the Victoria arm, opened on 1 May 1865 and South Croydon opened that September.

A third track had been laid between New Cross and Croydon in August 1844 for atmospheric trains. This method of train propulsion was abandoned by the LB&SCR in 1847, but the extra track was retained to provide additional capacity for northbound locomotive-hauled trains. A fourth track, used for southbound services, was added to this section of line by 1854.

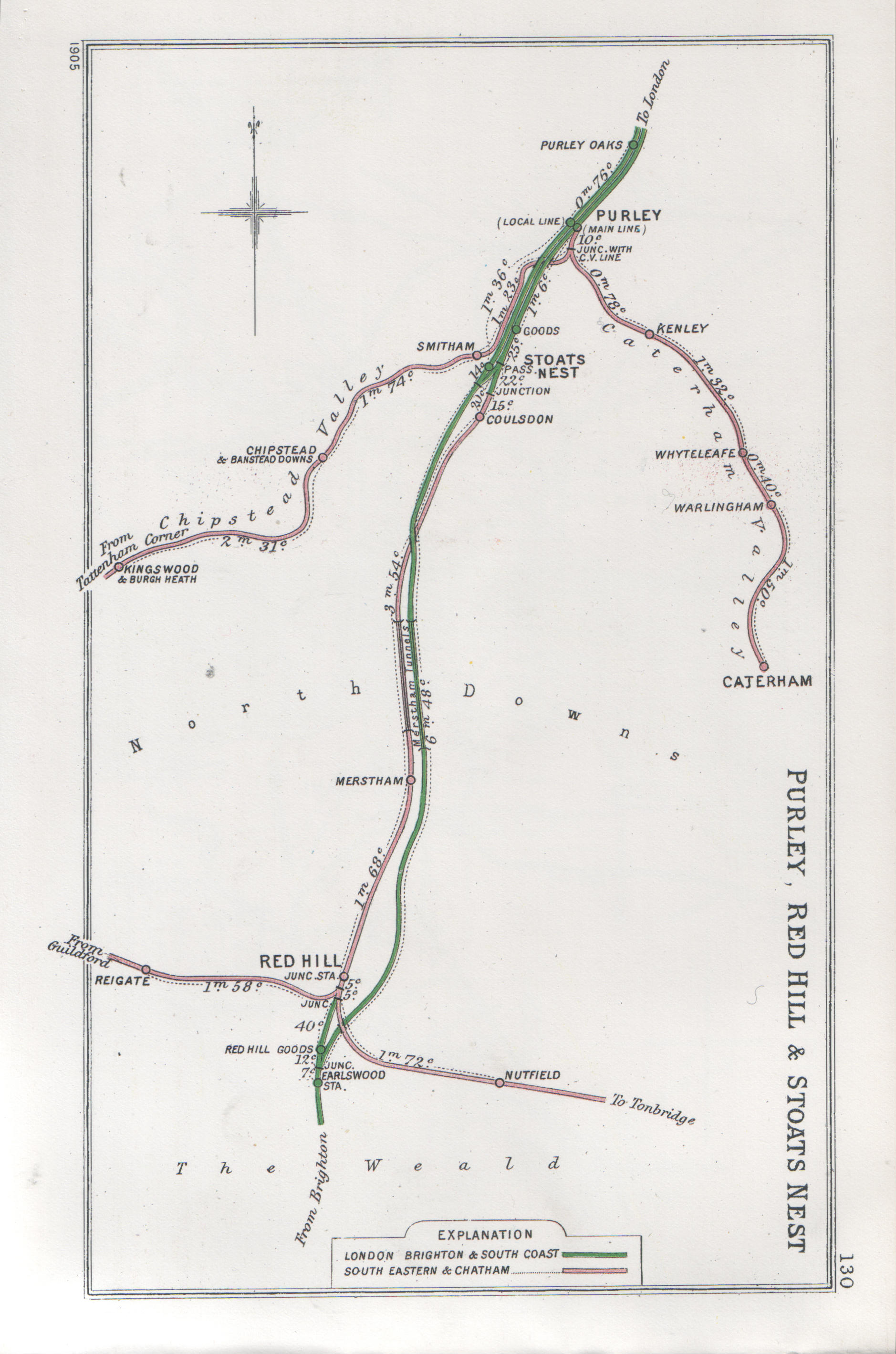
The Quarry Line was built at the end of the 19th century to bypass the station and junctions at Redhill.

Between Stoats Nest and Redhill, the Brighton Main Line was owned by the SER. Congestion at the junctions at the south end of Redhill station prompted the LB&SCR to propose a two-track bypass of this section of line. The new line, which included two new tunnels and extensive cuttings, was authorised by parliament on 20 July 1894. A second act, permitting minor changes to the route, was given royal assent on 20 July 1896. The Quarry Line, as the bypass became known, opened to freight services on 5 November 1899 and to passenger trains on 1 April the following year.

Five stations opened on the Brighton Main Line in the 1870s and 1880s. Brockley opened on 6 March 1871 to serve a new area of residential development. Norbury was built on a speculative basis, with one third of the cost being contributed by developers, and opened on 1 January 1878. Similarly, the cost of Honor Oak Park station, which opened on 1 April 1886, was also part-paid by developers. On 1 August that year Wivelsfield opened and trains began calling at Coulsdon South on 1 October 1889. The final station to be built on the line in the 19th century was Purley Oaks, which opened on 5 November 1899.

Work to quadruple the Brighton Main Line continued in the first decade of the 20th century. Two additional tracks were brought into use between Streatham Common and Windmill Bridge Junction (north of Croydon) in July 1903. The line between Redhill and Three Bridges was quadrupled in 1907 and from Three Bridges to the southern limit of four-tracking at Balcombe Tunnel Junction in 1911.

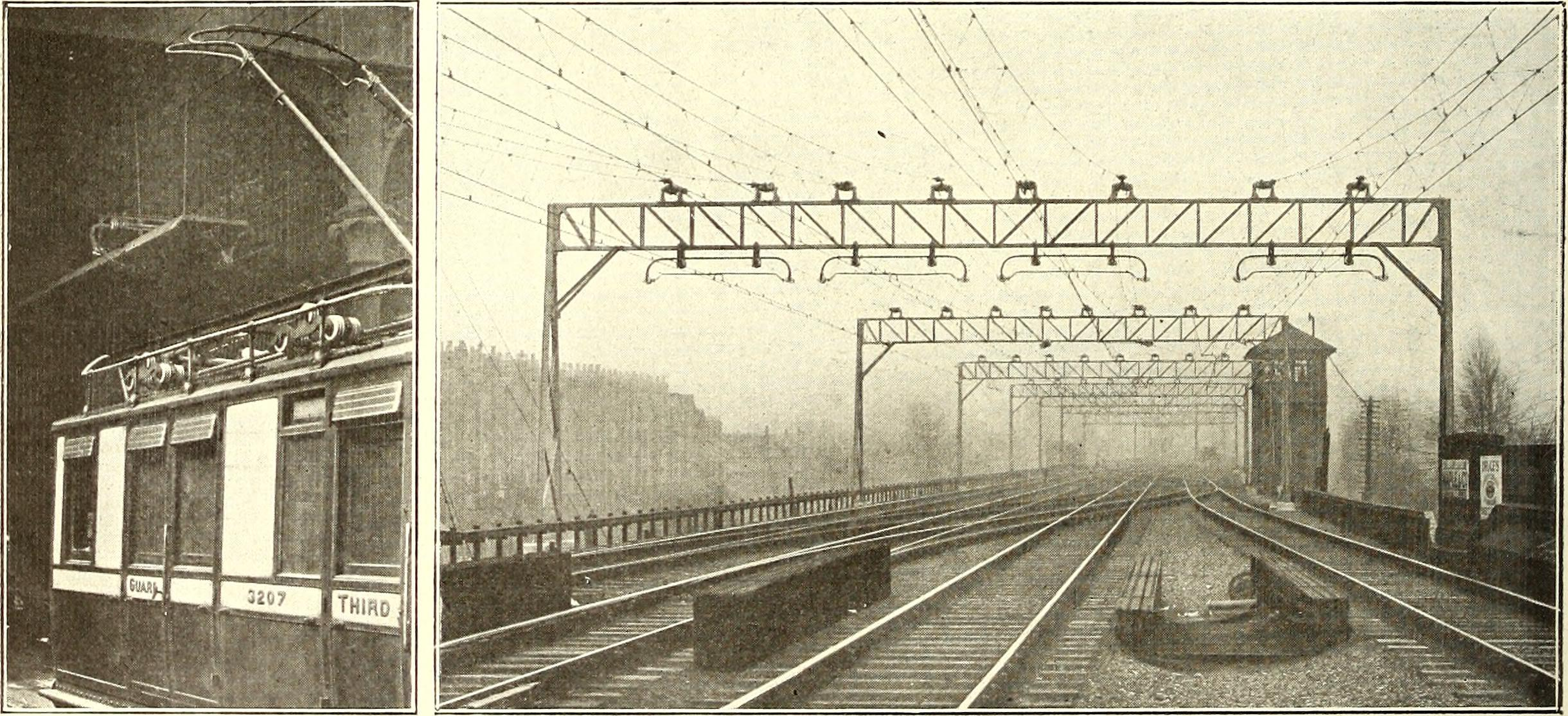
Overhead line electrification at Balham in 1911

The first parts of the Brighton Main Line to be electrified, were the approaches to London Bridge and Victoria stations. The chosen system used overhead wires, energised to 6,700 V AC, and multiple units equipped with pantographs for current collection. The new infrastructure allowed electric trains to start running between the two termini via the South London Line on 1 December 1909. On 12 May 1911, the electrification was extended from Battersea Park to Crystal Palace via Balham and to Norwood Junction and Selhurst on 3 March 1912.

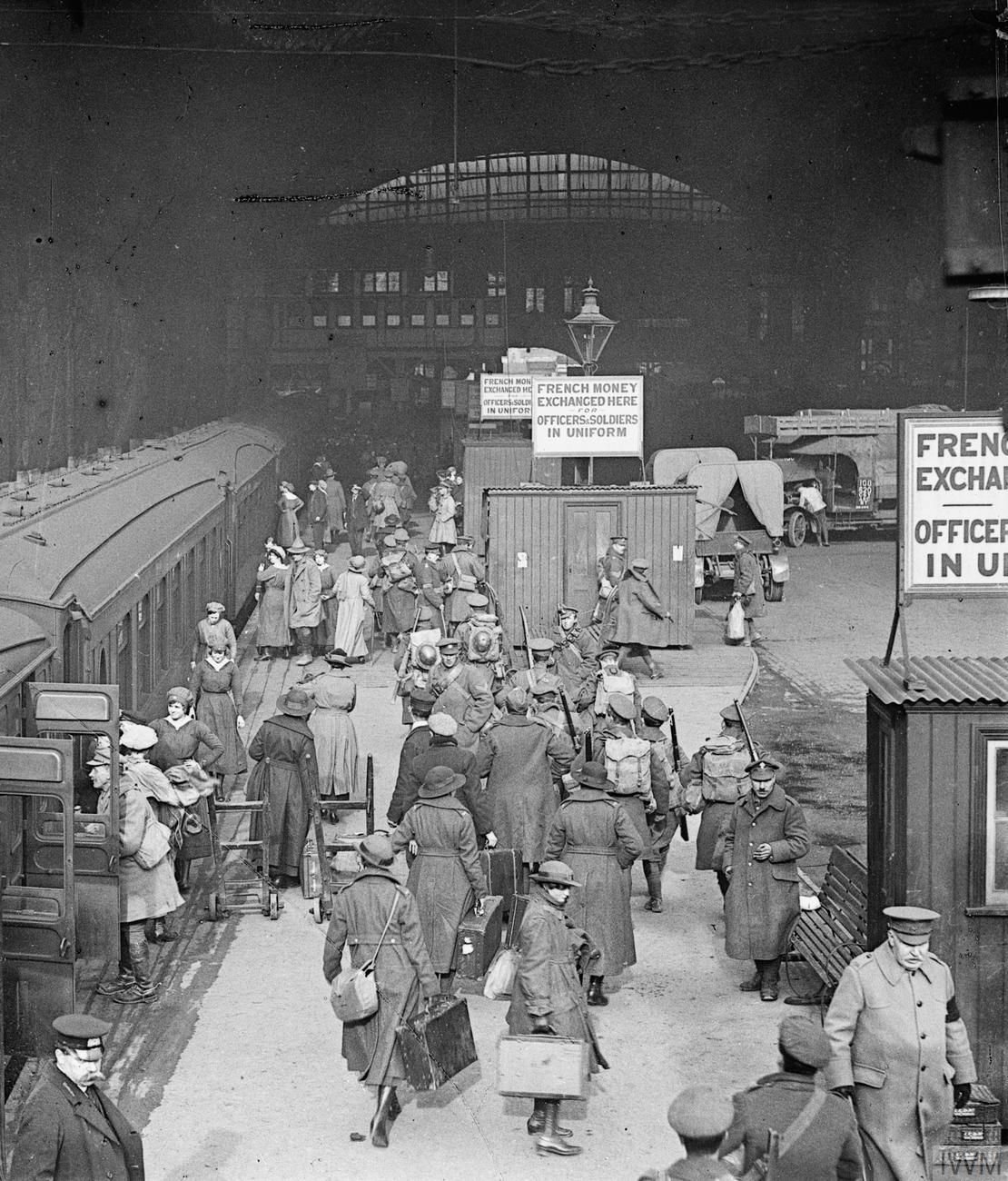
Soldiers at London Victoria station during the First World War

During the First World War, the Brighton Main Line was the target of two Zeppelin attacks. The line at the south end of East Croydon station was damaged on 13 October 1915 and Streatham Common station was hit by a bomb in September 1916. Salfords station was opened on 8 October 1915 initially for the use of workers at the nearby Monotype Corporation factory. It continued to operate as a private halt after the war and was not opened to the general public until 1932.

=== Grouping (1923–1948) ===
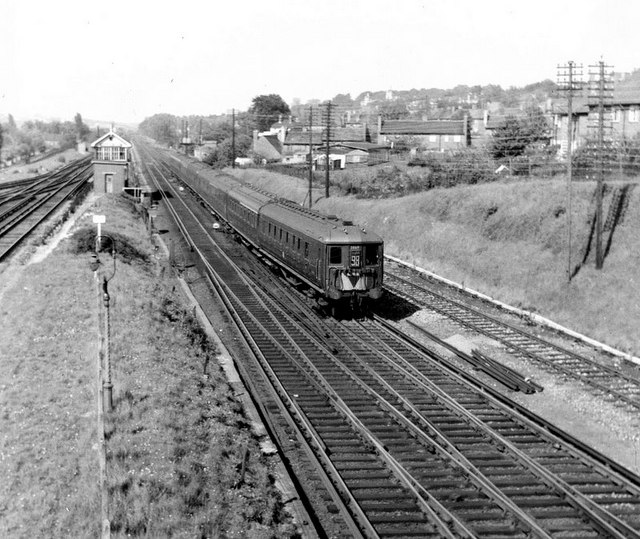
A 4-LAV electric multiple unit approaching Coulsdon North: These trains were used on the Brighton Main Line between 1933 and 1969.

Under the Railways Act 1921, the Brighton Main Line became part of the Southern Railway in 1923. The overhead electrification of the line as far south as Coulsdon North was completed in April 1925, but in August the following year, the company decided that all future electrification projects would use the DC third-rail system and that the existing overhead wire system would be replaced. The conversion of the existing electrified sections was completed in September 1929 and third-rail electrification reached Three Bridges in July 1932. The electrification of the entire line was completed on 1 January 1933, when the section between Three Bridges and Brighton was commissioned.

A major resignalling project on the southern part of the Brighton Main Line was undertaken in 1932. Colour light signalling was commissioned between Coulsdon North and Balcombe Tunnel Junction on 4 June 1932. Six signal boxes were closed and control of this section of line was transferred to Three Bridges. In October 1932, colour light signalling was commissioned between Balcombe Tunnel Junction and Brighton. Haywards Heath station was rebuilt with two island platforms, each with two platform faces able to accommodate 12-car trains. Platforms 3 to 6 at Brighton were also lengthened as part of the same project.

Redhill station was substantially rebuilt in 1932 as part of the electrification programme. A new sorting office was opened in the town in 1933, replacing the previous facility which had been built in 1884. Further upgrades to enable larger volumes of mail to be handled at the station were undertaken in 1935 and 1938. Rail transport of Post Office mail ceased following the opening of the Willesden postal rail hub in 1996.

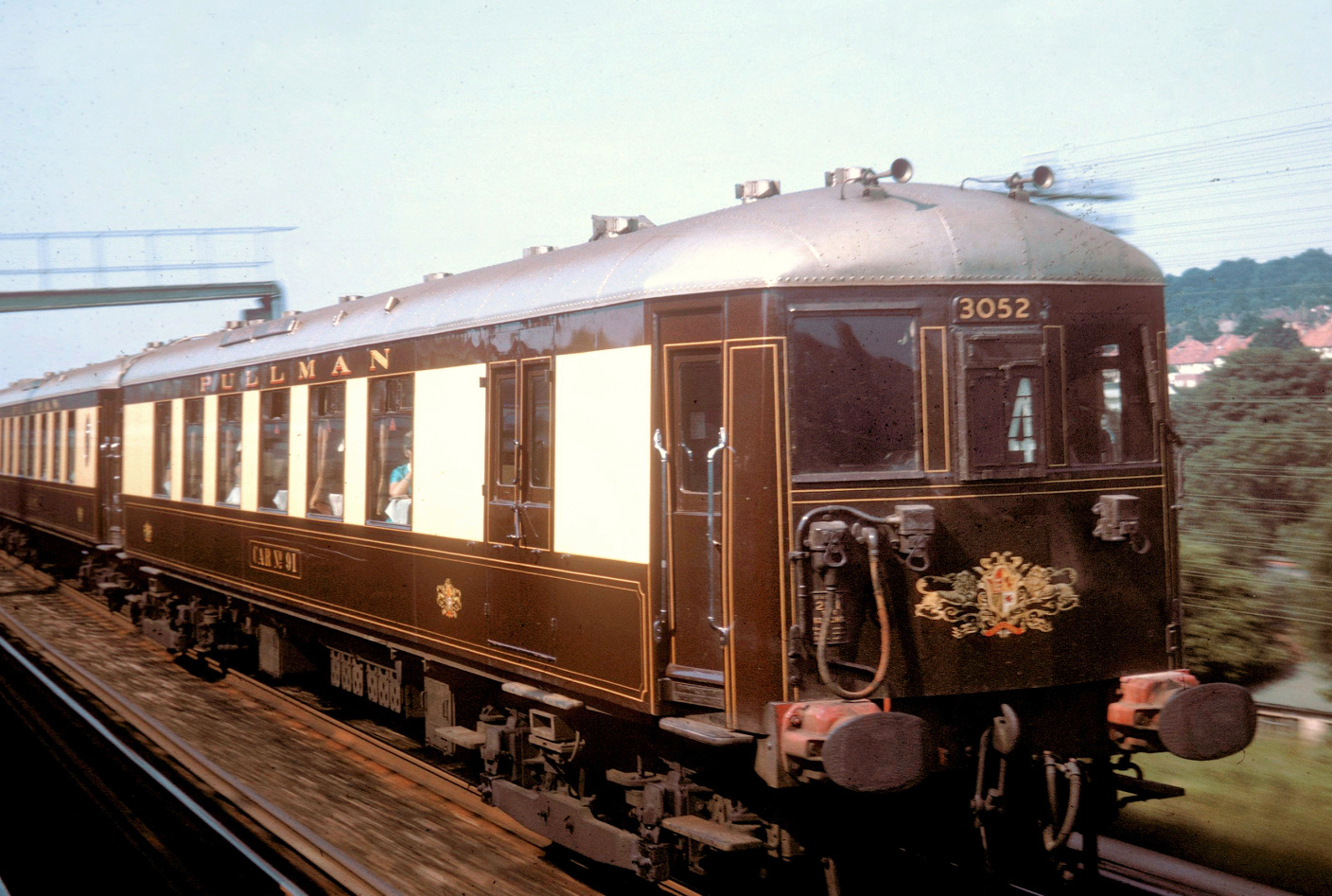
A Class 403 (5-BEL) unit in Pullman livery at Purley Oaks in 1964

A Pullman dining service between London and Brighton, nicknamed the Brighton Belle, was launched on 29 June 1934. It used five-car 75 mph (121 km/h) capable Class 403 (5-BEL) units, the first all-electric Pullman trains in the world. Initially, three return trips ran each day, but the service was increased to four in 1963. The Class 403 sets were withdrawn on 30 April 1972.

The Beehive, the original terminal building at Gatwick Airport, opened in mid-1936. It was served by Tinsley Green station, which had opened in September the previous year and which was renamed Gatwick Airport on 1 June 1936. The station was relocated northwards to its current site at the South Terminal on 27 May 1958.

During the Second World War, the Brighton Main Line was a target for enemy bombing. Bombs caused damage to the tracks at Norbury on 19 October 1940 and outside Victoria station on 21 December that year. Both London termini were damaged in a raid on 11 May 1941 and a V-1 flying bomb caused extensive damage to the station offices at Victoria on 12 June 1944. Further bomb damage occurred at Forest Hill on 23 June 1944.

=== Nationalisation (1948–1996) ===
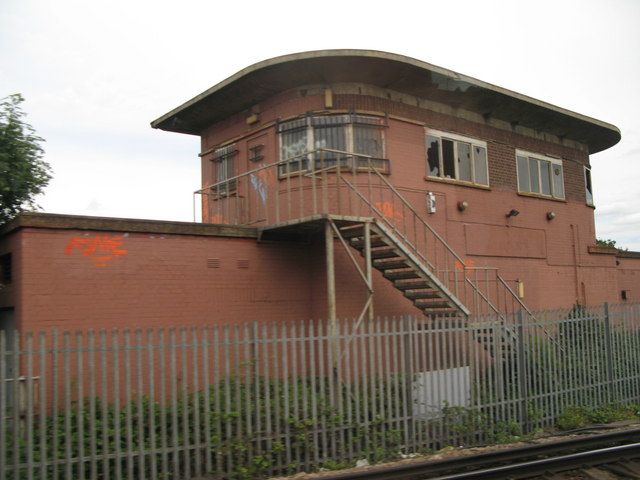
Balham signal box opened on 12 October 1952 and closed on 7 June 1981.

Under the Transport Act 1947, the Brighton Main Line became part of the Southern Region of British Railways. During the 1950s, work continued to modernise the signalling system, which included the installation of colour lights between Selhurst and East Croydon in March 1954. In the same decade, the number of signal boxes on the line was reduced and new boxes were commissioned at Balham, Norwood Junction, Gloucester Road Junction and Purley.

The South Terminal at Gatwick Airport was opened on 9 June 1958. The new terminal was directly linked to a new railway station on the Brighton Main Line, which had opened on 27 May that year. The former airport station, located close to the redundant Beehive terminal, had closed on 18 May 1958.

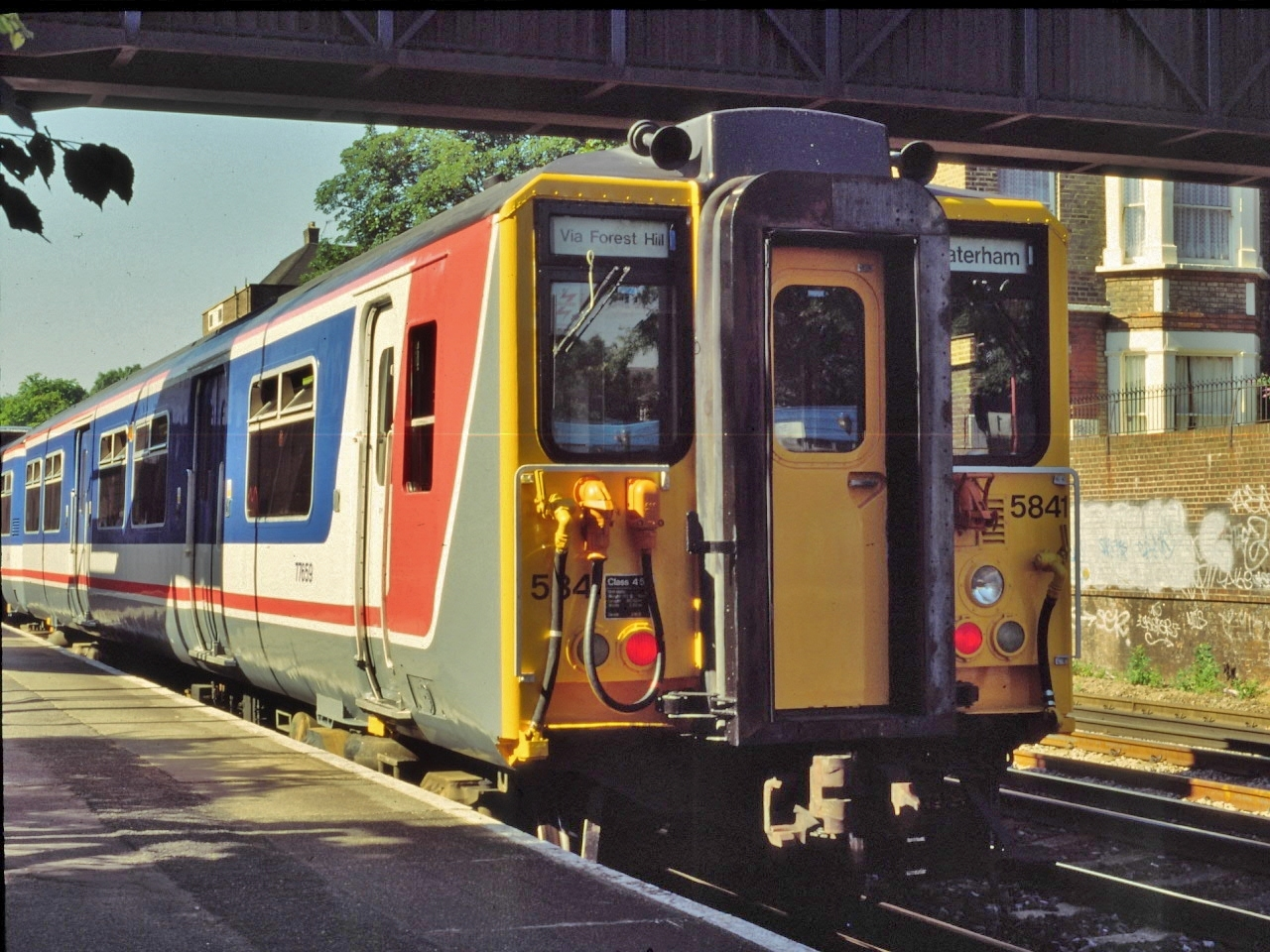
A Class 455 unit at Sydenham in Network SouthEast livery

On 4 January 1982, the Brighton Main Line and the majority of the Southern Region of British Railways, became part of the new "London & South Eastern" sector of British Rail. Four years later, on 10 June 1986, the sector was rebranded to become Network SouthEast.

In the early 1980s, a major resignalling project was undertaken that involved the closure of the majority of the signal boxes on the line and the transfer of control to Victoria and Three Bridges signalling centres. London Bridge panel box, which had opened in 1975, retained control of the line north of Norwood Junction. Remodelling of Windmill Bridge Junction was undertaken, with the creation of an additional flyover to eliminate conflicting movements between trains on the slow lines. (Note: The embankments required for the creation of the new flyovers at Windmill Bridge Junction were constructed using spoil from Betteshanger Colliery in Kent.) The arrangement of the tracks at East Croydon was changed to route all fast services through platforms 1, 2 and 3 on the west side of the station.

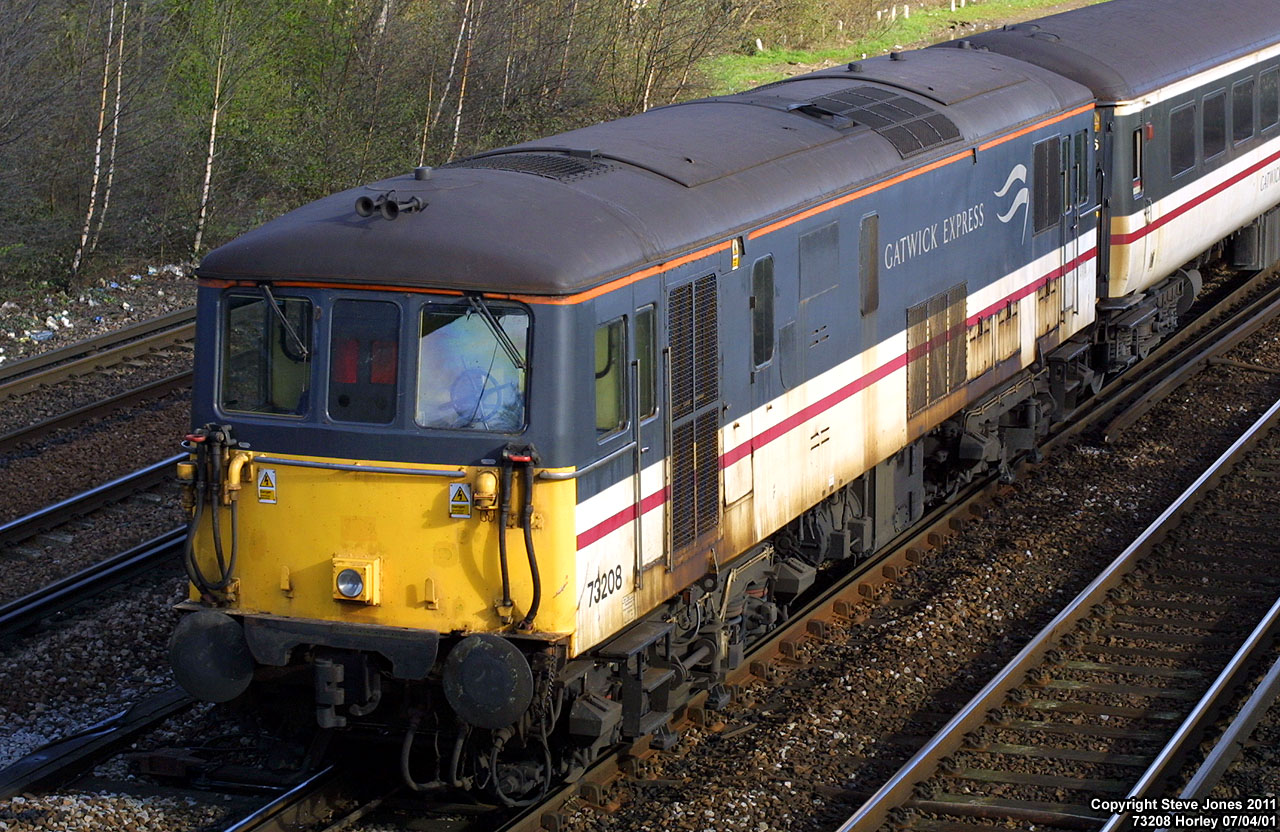
A Class 73 locomotive in InterCity livery operating a Gatwick Express service in push mode

Gatwick Express services were launched by Network SouthEast on 14 May 1984 using 90 mph (140 km/h) capable Class 73 locomotives in push-pull mode, each hauling a rake of Mark 2f coaches and a Class 414 (2-HAP) driver motor brake unit. The journey was timetabled to take 30 minutes and seven trainsets were required to operate the service. In the first seven months of the service, the number of passengers travelling by rail to Gatwick Airport went up by 38% and revenue on the route increased by 52%. Responsibility for running the Gatwick Express was transferred to the InterCity sector of British Rail in April of the following year. A service from Reading to Gatwick via Guildford and Redhill, later branded the North Downs Line, was introduced in May 1980. A third new route launched by Network SouthEast was the Bedford–Brighton Thameslink service via the Snow Hill tunnel under central London, which began on 16 May 1988.

Two major stations on the Brighton Main Line were rebuilt in the early 1990s. A new circular station building at Redhill station, designed by the architecture firm, Troutham & Macasum, was completed towards the end of 1990. East Croydon station, designed by Alan Brookes Associates, opened on 19 August 1992.

=== Privatisation (1996–present) ===
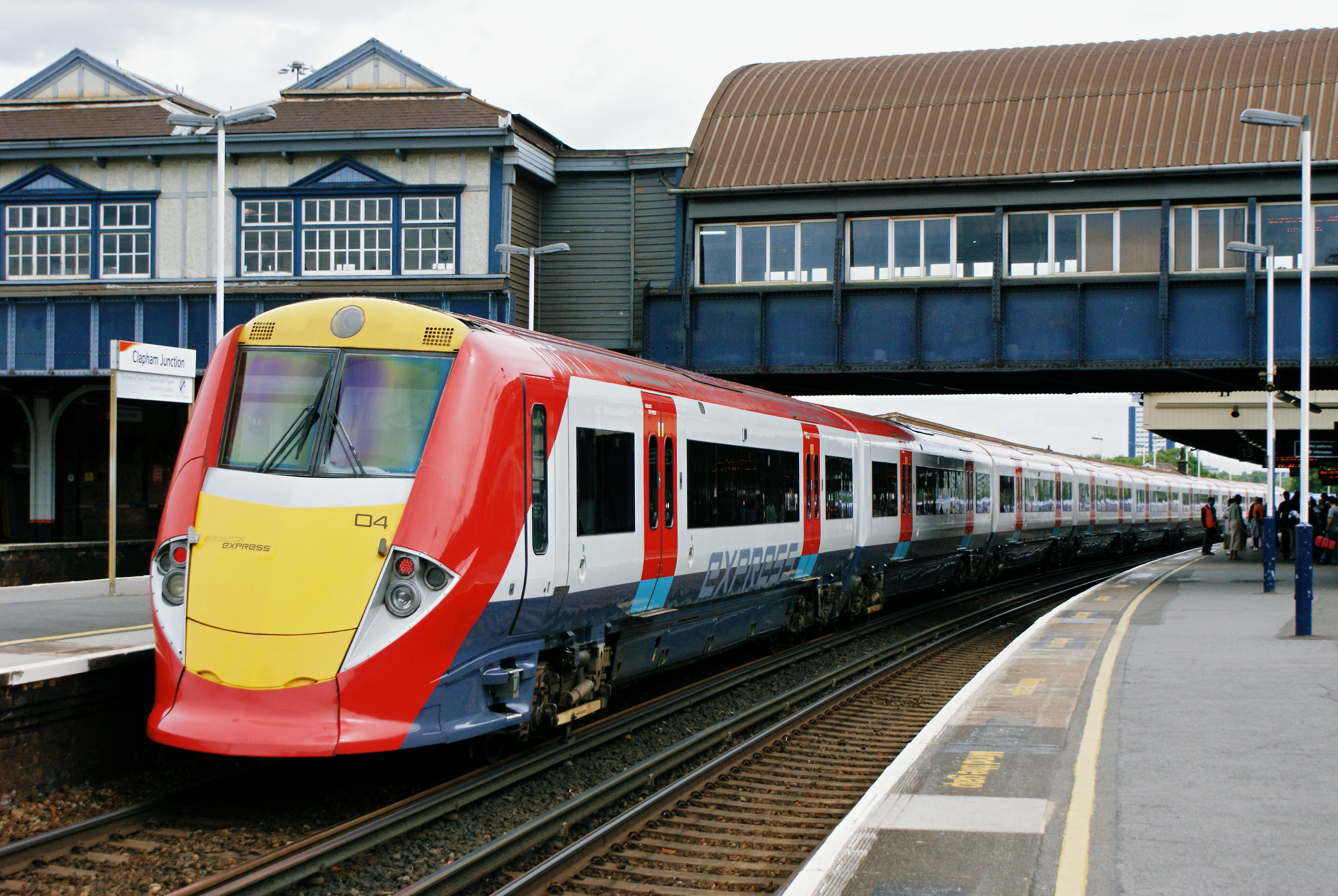
A Class 460 in Gatwick Express livery at Clapham Junction

The Gatwick Express franchise was one of the first parts of the UK rail network to be transferred to a private operator, when National Express began running the trains on 28 April 1996. The company introduced Class 460 units to their services in 1999, although the final locomotive-hauled trains were not withdrawn until 2005.

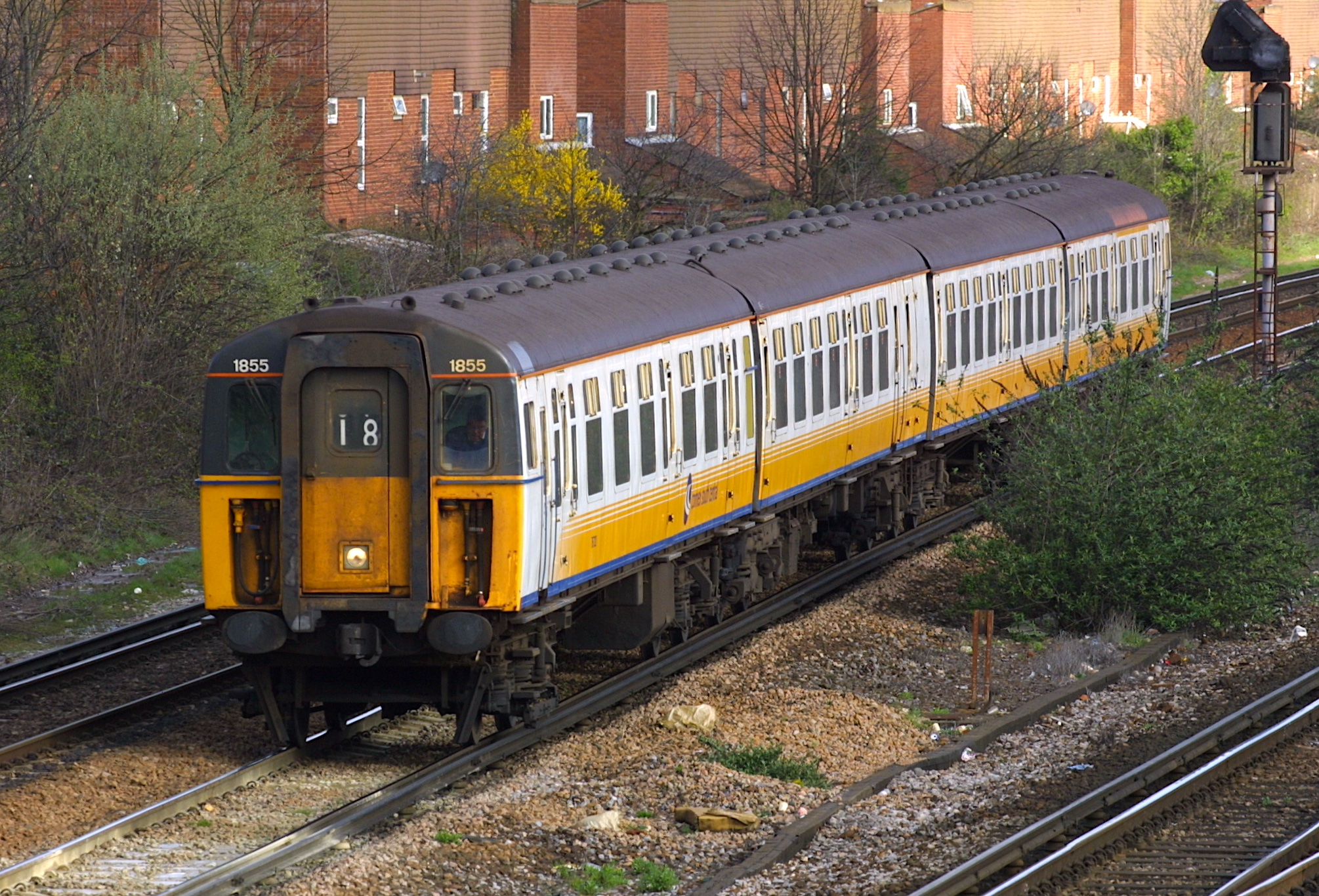
A Class 421 (4-CIG) unit in Connex South Central livery at Horley

Connex was awarded a seven-year franchise in 1996 to operate passenger trains on the Brighton Main Line as Connex South Central. The company introduced a Gatwick Airport–Rugby service, which ran via the West London Line, and also deployed Class 319 units to Victoria–Brighton express services. Following concerns over Connex's management and performance, the Shadow Strategic Rail Authority decided to re-tender the franchise in 2000. In October that year, the competition was won by Govia, which took over the running of trains in August 2001, having bought out the final two years of Connex's contract for £30M.

Govia's ten-year franchise formally began in May 2003, when it introduced the "Southern" brand name. The agreement required the company to retire the final slam-door trains, achieved in 2005, and to invest £853M in new rolling stock. The Gatwick Express and Southern franchises were merged in May 2008, to allow capacity increases and better use of train paths on the Brighton Main Line. The new arrangement allowed Gatwick Express services to be extended to Brighton, initially during peak periods, but required the replacement of the ten Class 460s with seventeen Class 442 units. The third South Central franchise, awarded again to Govia, began in 2009 and required the operator to increase capacity on its routes by 10% by December 2013. In 2014, 700 more services were running on the South Central network on weekdays than at privatisation in 1996. In May 2010, London Overground began running stopping services on the Norwood Junction–New Cross Gate section of the Brighton Main Line, allowing trains that had previously terminated at London Bridge to run via the East London Line to Dalston Junction.

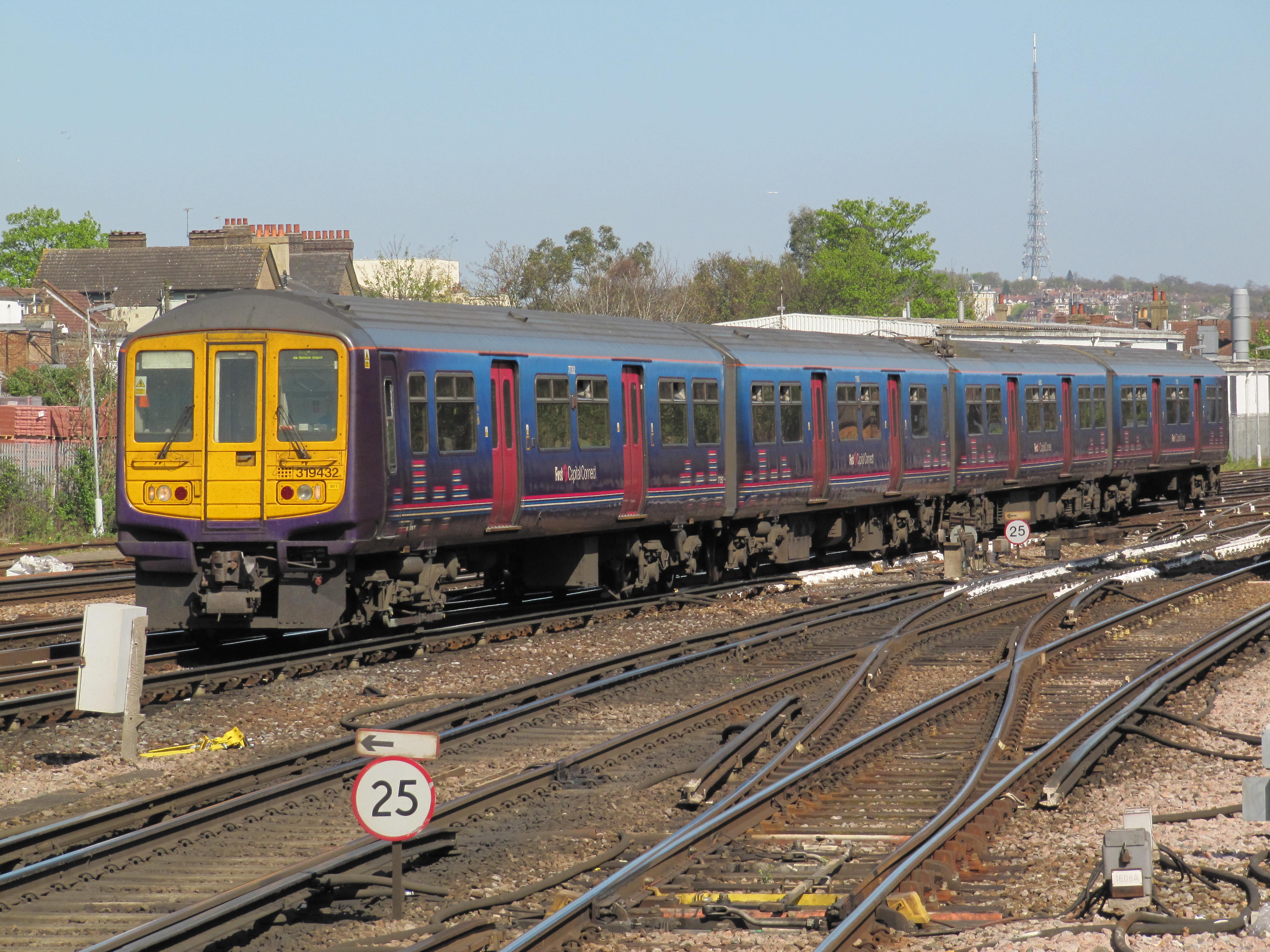
A Class 319 unit in First Capital Connect livery at Gatwick Airport

The Thameslink franchise, which included services from Brighton to Bedford, was awarded to Govia in 1997. It was initially due to end in 2004, but delays in the Thameslink 2000 project resulted in the company being awarded a two-year extension to 2006. The new franchise, also incorporating services on the Great Northern Route, was awarded to FirstGroup, which began operating trains under the First Capital Connect brand on 1 April 2006. The company introduced 12-car trains to the Brighton Main Line in December 2011.

The South Central franchise was terminated two years early in 2014, allowing Southern- and Gatwick Express-branded services to be combined with those run by First Capital Connect, to create the Thameslink, Southern and Great Northern franchise. Awarded to Govia, the new franchise took the form of a management contract, reducing the risks to the operator arising from the introduction of new services as part of the Thameslink programme. During the lifetime of the franchise, the Bermondsey dive-under was constructed, reducing the conflict between Southern trains departing from London Bridge and northbound Thameslink services heading towards London Blackfriars, and an extensive refurbishment of London Bridge station was completed. Govia was heavily criticised for the poor implementation of a new timetable in May 2018, which routed additional services from the Brighton Main Line via the Thameslink core. The company was also criticised for its role in the 2016–2019 United Kingdom railway strikes. In 2022, Govia was awarded a three-year extension to its management contract, which took effect on 1 April that year.

== Major accidents ==
- 21 August 1854: An SER excursion train collided with an LB&SCR locomotive hauling ballast waggons between East Croydon and Windmill Bridge. Three passengers sustained fatal injuries.
- 25 August 1861, Clayton Tunnel rail crash: Two trains collided in the tunnel due to a signaller's error, killing 23 passengers.
- 30 April 1866: An SER passenger train collided with an LB&SCR goods train near Caterham Junction station (now Purley), killing two passengers and a guard. The fireman of the passenger train later died of his injuries.
- 23 December 1899: A Pullman express from Brighton ran into the back of a train from Newhaven in fog at Wivelsfield. Six people were killed.
- 29 January 1910: A passenger express train from Brighton to Victoria derailed at Stoats Nest station (later Coulsdon North). Five passengers and two people standing on the station platform were killed.
- 2 April 1937, Battersea Park rail crash: Two passenger trains, one from Coulsdon North to Victoria and the other from Victoria to London Bridge, collided at Battersea Park due to a signaller's error, killing six passengers and the guard of the London Bridge train. A further three passengers subsequently died of their injuries.
- 24 October 1947, South Croydon rail crash: Two passenger trains, both travelling to London Bridge, collided in fog due to a signaller's error. A total of 32 people died, including the driver of the second train.
- 4 March 1989 Purley station rail crash: Two passenger trains, both travelling to Victoria, collided north of Purley station. Part of the rear train fell down the embankment, killing five people.

== Listed buildings ==
There are 13 listed structures associated with the Brighton Main Line.

| Name | Grade | Location | Type | Completed (Note: The date given is the date used by Historic England as significant for the initial building or that of an important part in the structure's description.) | Date designated | Grid ref. (Note: The grid reference is based on the British national grid reference system, sometimes known as OSGB36, used by the Ordnance Survey.) Geo-coordinates | Entry number (Note: The "List Entry Number" is a unique number assigned to each listed building and scheduled monument by Historic England.) | Image |
|---|---|---|---|---|---|---|---|---|
| Victoria railway station: The former London, Brighton and South Coast railway station and rear concourse | II | London | station | 1908 | 25 July 2001 | TQ28897901; 51°29′43″N 0°08′41″W | 1389322 | Victoria railway station: The former London, Brighton and South Coast railway station and rear concourse More images |
| British Airways terminal | II | Buckingham Palace Road, London | airline terminal | 1939 | 16 January 1981 | TQ28657858; 51°29′30″N 0°08′54″W | 1291075 | British Airways terminal More images |
| Battersea Park railway station | II | Battersea, London | station | 1867 | 6 April 1983 | TQ28767700; 51°28′37″N 0°08′51″W | 1357652 | Battersea Park railway station |
| Railway bridge (Southern Region) | II | Battersea, London | rail bridge over road | 1848 | 6 April 1983 | TQ28747692; 51°28′36″N 0°08′51″W | 1065548 | Railway bridge (Southern Region) |
| London Bridge station, platforms 6–16 (Brighton side) | II | London | rail bridge over road | 1867 | 19 December 1988 | TQ32968010; 51°30′15″N 0°05′09″W | 1385808 | London Bridge station, platforms 6–16 (Brighton side) More images |
| Railway viaduct arches | II | Bermondsey Street, London | rail bridge over road | 1866 | 7 July 2011 | TQ33177993; 51°30′09″N 0°04′57″W | 1400290 | Railway viaduct arches More images |
| Railway bridge | II | Abbey Street, London | rail bridge over road | 1836 | 2 July 1979 | TQ33877945; 51°29′53″N 0°04′22″W | 1376520 | Railway bridge |
| Railway bridge | II | Spa Road, London | rail bridge over road | 1836 | 2 July 1979 | TQ34147924; 51°29′46″N 0°04′09″W | 1385932 | Railway bridge |
| Station goods shed | II | Horley, Surrey | goods shed | 1840 | 26 May 1993 | TQ28644297; 51°10′17″N 0°09′41″W | 1261682 | Station goods shed |
| Ouse Valley Railway Viaduct | II* | Balcombe, West Sussex | railway viaduct | 1841 | 10 May 1983 | TQ32262795; 51°02′07″N 0°06′53″W | 1366101 | Ouse Valley Railway Viaduct More images |
| Clayton Tunnel north portal tunnel cottage | II | Pycombe, West Sussex | tunnel portal and cottage | 1841 | 10 May 1983 | TQ29841407; 51°54′41″N 0°09′16″W | 1025594 | Clayton Tunnel north portal tunnel cottage |
| New England Viaduct | II | Brighton | railway viaduct | 1839 | 25 August 1999 | TQ30910538; 50°49′59″N 0°08′34″W | 1380101 | New England Viaduct More images |
| Brighton station including train sheds | II* | Brighton | station | 1841 and 1883 | 29 April 1973 | TQ31030492; 50°49′45″N 0°08′27″W | 1380797 | Brighton station including train sheds More images |

== Sources ==
- Baker, Michael H. C. (1989). London to Brighton. Wellingborough: Patrick Stephens Ltd. ISBN 978-1-85-260146-1.
- Bonavia, Michael R. (1987). The History of the Southern Railway. London: Unwin Hyman. ISBN 978-0-04-385107-4.
- Brown, David (2009). Development of the London Suburban Network and Its Trains. Southern Electric. Vol. 1. Crowthorne: Capital Transport Publishing. ISBN 978-1-85-414330-3.
- Brown, David (2010). Main line electrification, the war years and British Railways. Southern Electric. Vol. 2. Crowthorne: Capital Transport Publishing. ISBN 978-1-85-414340-2.
- Brown, David; Jackson, Alan A. (1990). Network SouthEast Handbook. Harrow Weald: Capital Transport Publishing. ISBN 978-1-85-414129-3.
- Glover, John (2001). Southern Electric. Hersham: Ian Allan Ltd. ISBN 978-0-71-102807-4.
- Green, Chris; Vincent, Mike (2014). The Network SouthEast story. Hersham: Ian Allan Ltd. ISBN 978-0-86-093653-4.
- Jackson, Alan A. (1999). The Railway in Surrey. Penryn: Atlantic Transport Publishers. ISBN 978-0-90-689990-8.
- Mitchell, Vic; Smith, Keith (1986). Three Bridges to Brighton. Midhurst: Middleton Press. ISBN 978-0-90-652035-2.
- Mitchell, Vic; Smith, Keith (1987). Victoria to East Croydon. Midhurst: Middleton Press. ISBN 978-0-90-652040-6.
- Mitchell, Vic; Smith, Keith (1988a). London Bridge to East Croydon. Midhurst: Middleton Press. ISBN 978-0-90-652058-1.
- Mitchell, Vic; Smith, Keith (1988b). East Croydon to Three Bridges. Midhurst: Middleton Press. ISBN 978-0-90-652053-6.
- Oppitz, Leslie (1987). Sussex Railways Remembered. Newbury: Countryside Books. ISBN 978-0-90-539299-8.
- Oppitz, Leslie (1988). Surrey Railways Remembered. Newbury: Countryside Books. ISBN 978-1-85-306005-2.
- Quick, Michael (2023) [2001]. Railway Passenger Stations in Great Britain (PDF) (5.05 ed.). London: Railway and Canal Historical Society.
- Turner, J.T. Howard (1977). The London, Brighton & South Coast Railway. Vol. 1 : Origins and formation. London: B.T. Batsford. ISBN 978-0-71-340275-9.
- Turner, J.T. Howard (1978). The London, Brighton & South Coast Railway. Vol. 2 : Establishment and Growth. London: B.T. Batsford. ISBN 978-0-71-341198-0.
- Turner, J.T. Howard (1979). The London, Brighton & South Coast Railway. Vol. 3 : Completion and maturity. London: B.T. Batsford. ISBN 978-0-71-341389-2.
- White, H.P. (1992) [1961]. Southern England. A regional history of the railways of Great Britain. Vol. 2 (5th ed.). Redwood Press. ISBN 978-0-94-653777-8.
- "Kent / Sussex / Wessex Routes Sectional Appendix" (PDF). Network Rail. 2009.
- "Delivering a better railway for a better Britain | Route Specifications: South East" (PDF). Network Rail. 2016.
