= SR Class 4-LAV =

Southern Railway 4-LAV
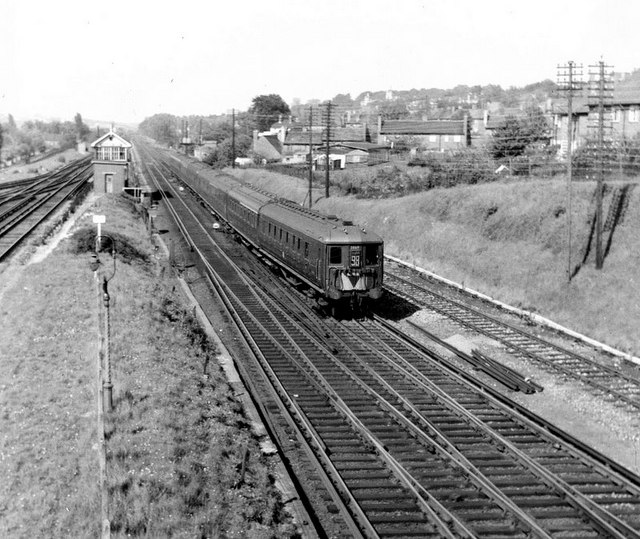
- 4-LAV unit approaching Coulsdon North c.1968
- In service: 1932–1969
- Manufacturer: Southern Railway
- Built at: Eastleigh Works
- Constructed: 1930–1932 (33), 1939–1940 (2)
- Number built: 35
- Number scrapped: All
- Formation: Power car + 2 trailer cars + power car
- Fleet numbers: Sets 1921–1953, later 2921–2955
- Capacity: 70 first class, 204 third class
- Operators: Southern Railway; British Railways
- Lines served: London Victoria to Brighton and Worthing

Specifications
- Car body construction: Steel panelled, wooden body, on steel underframe
- Train length: 257 ft 2 1/2 in (78.40 m)
- Weight: 139 long tons (141 t)
- Traction system: Four 275 hp (205 kW) traction motors
- Power output: 1,100 hp (820 kW)
- Electric systems: 750 V DC third rail
- Current collection: Contact shoe
- UIC classification: Bo′2′+2′2′+2′2′+2′Bo
- Braking system: Automatic air
- Coupling system: Screw-link
- Multiple working: Standard SR
- Track gauge: 4 ft 8 1/2 in (1,435 mm)

The Southern Railway (SR) gave the designation 4-LAV to the electric multiple units built to work the semi-fast services on the route between London and Brighton. None of these units survived long enough in British Rail ownership to be allocated a TOPS class.

== Construction ==
The original series of 4-LAV (4-car Lavatory stock) units, (numbers 1921–1953), were built at Eastleigh carriage works during 1931 and 1932 for use on the newly electrified London to Brighton line. They were fitted with four Metropolitan-Vickers 275 h.p. traction motors. Despite the prominence given to the lavatory provision in the SR designation, there was actually only one vehicle containing lavatories in the whole four-car unit, and due to the lack of corridors in the unit, only passengers in that coach had access to them. The units were renumbered 2921–2953 in the January/February 1937 renumbering of SR EMUs.

Two further units, (numbers 2954 and 2955) were added to stock in 1940, under the direction of Oliver Bulleid. These were fitted with English Electric 275 h.p. traction motors.

The DMBT (Driving Motor Brake Third) had a full-width cab with a guard's compartment behind, and seven third class compartments seating 70. The TC (Trailer Composite) had five first-class and four third-class compartments seating 40 in each class. The TCL (Trailer Composite with Lavatory) had five first-class and three third-class compartments seating 30 and 24, respectively, with a toilet at each end.

One unit, number 2926, was fitted with one 2-HAL type motor coach., having been involved in the South Croydon rail crash on 24 October 1947.

== Use ==
Throughout their careers they operated the slower services on the London to Brighton line between either London Bridge or Victoria and Brighton railway station. They were also used on stopping trains on the Arun Valley Line and on the Sussex coast lines to the east and west of Brighton.

== Formations ==
Initial formations of these units were as follows (cars not always formed in numerical order):

Unit Numbers	DMBT	TCL	TC	DMBT
1921–1953 / 2921–2953	10501–10565 (odds)	12001–12033	11501–11533	10502–10566 (evens)
2954–2955	10497–10499	11999–12000	11534–11535	10498–10500

== Withdrawal ==
The majority of the 4-LAV units were withdrawn from ordinary passenger service in 1968, with the final few going in April 1969, being replaced on their duties by new 4-VEP sets. Almost all the units were scrapped, but some of the 1940-built cars survived in departmental (non-revenue earning) use for several more years. However, no 4-LAV stock exists today.
