= Werrington dive-under =

Major railway junction in Cambridgeshire, England

Coordinates: 52.6131°N 0.2884°W

A schematic of Werrington Junction. The left hand side details the previous layout and the right hand side the completed layout as at October 2024. New sections of track are shown in red and sections of track dismantled are shown in green

The Werrington dive-under (known as the Werrington Grade Separation during construction) is a replacement dual track grade separated railway junction at Werrington Junction, 3 miles (5 km) north of Peterborough railway station in Cambridgeshire, England. The junction leads to the Great Northern/Great Eastern Joint line (GN/GE) which goes through Spalding to Lincoln and beyond. Completed and opened in December 2021, the dive under allows trains on the west side of the East Coast Main Line (ECML) to access the GN/GE line without conflicting with the faster passenger services on the ECML.

The dive under was constructed by a 'jacked deck' on slide paths installed in access tunnels. The curved 'jack deck', pushed into place beneath the main running lines, will be the first use of such a structure in the United Kingdom. The installation uses a patented method of construction.

== Original junction ==
When the line closed between March and Spalding in 1982, freight traffic, instead of cutting across the western edge of the Fens, was diverted through Peterborough station. Trains therefore had to use Werrington Junction, located 3 miles (5 km) north of Peterborough railway station, for access to/from the GN/GE line. In order to use the junction trains have to cross the lines used by the fast ECML passenger services on the level and, in the case of trains to Spalding, also use the Up Fast line for three miles between Peterborough station and the junction. This can cause delay to fast passenger trains.

Railtrack, Network Rail's predecessor, recognised that the ECML was congested and so upgraded the GN/GE line to accommodate the heavy container trains to and from the east coast ports. However Werrington Junction was still a significant bottleneck.

== The dive-under ==
In 2016 Network Rail submitted a Transport and Works Act Order (TWAO) to the Secretary of State for Transport to build either a flyover or a dive-under to avoid the fast lines north of Peterborough and allow passenger and freight trains to access all lines without affecting other faster services. In summer 2018 Chris Grayling approved the order after a public inquiry favoured the dive-under option in preference to the flyover. Initially costings were estimated to be in the region of £100 million, but the agreed cost on approval was £200 million.

The project saw the construction of 1.9 miles (3 km) of new line which runs underneath the fast lines, culverting works on Marholm Brook, and the movement of the Stamford lines 82 feet (25 m) westwards over the culverted brook. This means that trains for the GN/GE line no longer need to cross the fast lines on the level, nor use the Up Fast line between Peterborough station and the junction. The project, coupled with other ECML improvement schemes (such as the four-tracking from Huntingdon to Woodwalton), improved capacity on the line through Peterborough by 33%, according to Network Rail. This equates to two extra train paths an hour in 2021, when the work was completed. This will, in turn, cut 21 minutes off the fastest King's Cross to Edinburgh Waverley service, 13 minutes off the fastest King's Cross to Leeds service, and it will also see an increase of 1,050 'Intercity' possible seats per hour on express trains through Peterborough.

The Spalding and Peterborough Transport Forum claimed that increasing the number of freight trains operating through Spalding would cause the level crossing barriers in the town to be down for 24 minutes of every hour. The Campaign for Better Transport praised the works and stated

This upgrade will open up the route from Peterborough to Doncaster via Lincoln for more freight services which will further reduce road congestion, road fatalities and pollution. Longer term we would like to see it electrified.

The construction will involve use of the UK's first curved box jack, which will consist of ten 16-metre (52 ft) sections joined together, creating a 160-metre (520 ft) curved box. The contractors expect to remove 120,000 cubic metres (4,200,000 cu ft) of earth and the box will weigh 11,000 tonnes (12,000 tons).

The junctions at the north and south ends were connected in November 2021, as was the signalling. However, regulatory approval will mean a projected opening date in December 2021. Provision has been made for future overhead electrification works if necessary.

== See also ==
- Bermondsey dive-under – another dive-under which was constructed in the 2010s near London Bridge station
- Hitchin Flyover – a flyover at Hitchin to alleviate traffic problems in accessing the Cambridge line north of Hitchin
- Nuneaton North Chord – a flyover on the West Coast Main Line at Nuneaton constructed for similar reasons
