= South Croydon railway station =

National Rail station in London, England

South Croydon
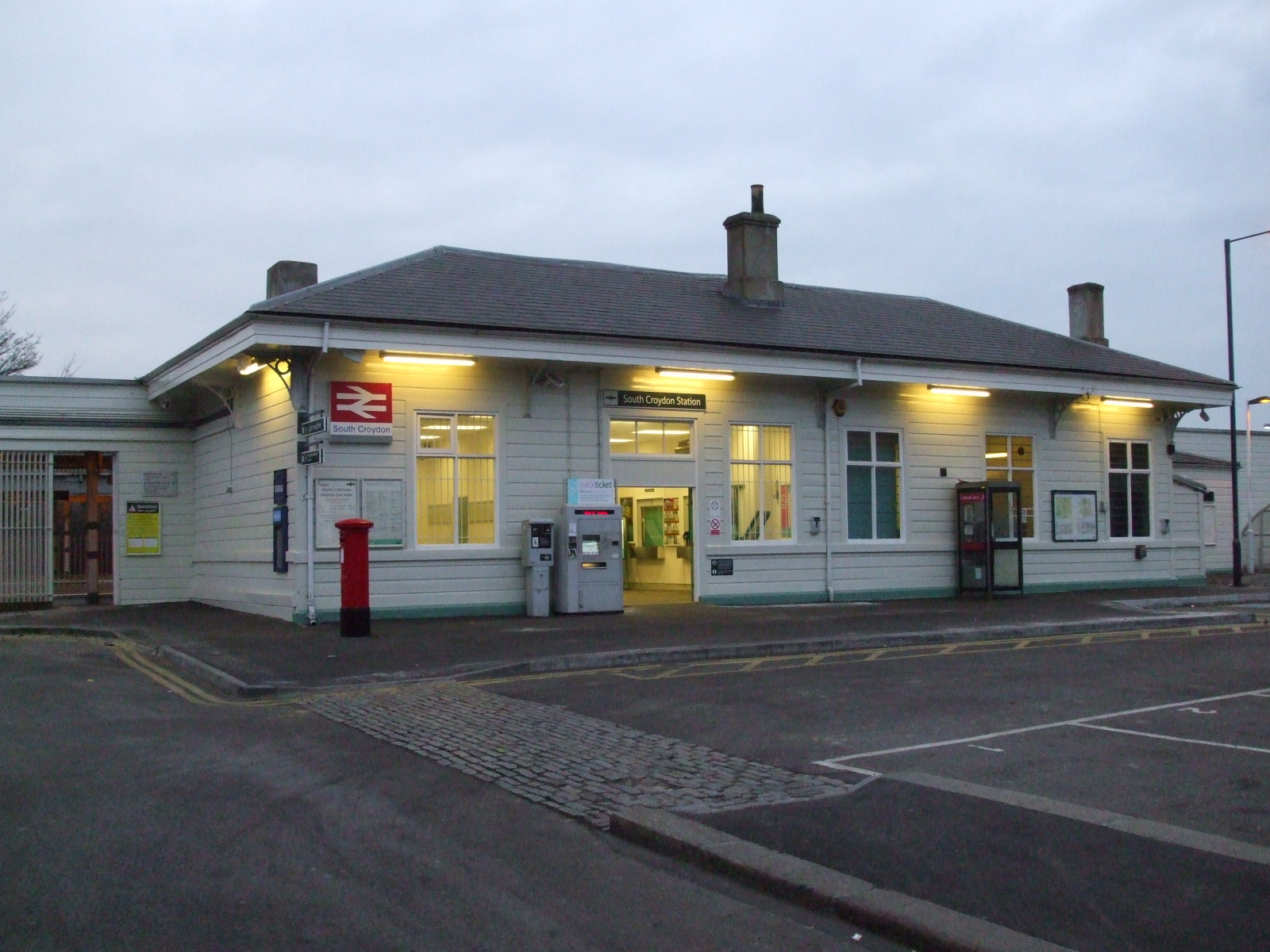
- Interactive map of South Croydon

General information
- Location: South Croydon
- Local authority: London Borough of Croydon
- Managed by: Southern
- Station code: SCY
- DfT category: D
- Number of platforms: 5 (2 in use; 3 at peak times)
- Fare zone: 5

National Rail annual entry and exit
- 2020–21: ▼0.338 million
- 2021–22: ▲0.601 million
- 2022–23: ▲0.733 million
- 2023–24: ▲0.948 million
- 2024–25: ▲1.089 million

Key dates
- 1 September 1865: Opened

Other information
- External links: Departures; Facilities
- Coordinates: 51.362889°N 0.093667°W

South Croydon railway station is in the London Borough of Croydon in south London, in London fare zone 5. It is on the Brighton Line at its junction with the Oxted Line, 11 miles 21 chains (18.1 km) measured from London Bridge.

The station is managed by Southern, and the station is served by both Southern and Thameslink services.

== History ==
Originally South Croydon was a terminus next to the through lines of the Brighton Line but without any platforms on them, the end of a 1 mile (1.6 km) extension of the local lines from New Croydon, opened by the London Brighton and South Coast Railway on 1 September 1865. The aim was to provide more space for reversing local trains than could be afforded at busy New Croydon. The rapid growth of the town in this area may also have been a factor.

In 1894 the railway obtained authority to extend the local lines to Coulsdon, where they connected with the new Quarry line. The station was rebuilt as a through station with platform faces on all lines prior to the opening of the line in November 1899.

In 1947 a train crash about 550 yards (500 m) south of the station killed 32 people, the worst accident in the history of the Southern Railway.

On 1 August 2011, a landslide caused by a burst water main occurred approximately 200 yards (180 m) north of the station, blocking the railway for 24 hours.

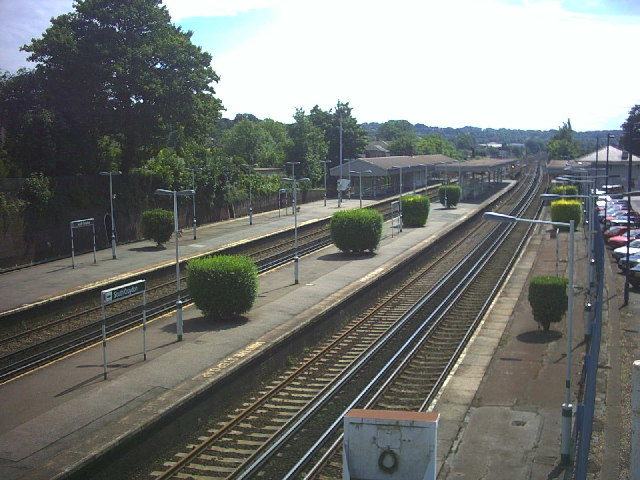
Station platforms

== Platforms ==
South Croydon has five platforms connected by a narrow subway.

Platforms 1 and 2 are rarely used as fast Southern services from London Victoria to Brighton, Thameslink services and Gatwick Express, and these services do not call.

Platform 3 is used by up trains to London Bridge and Bedford in the peak hours

Platform 4 is used by services that do not call, heading southbound, and some Thameslink services in both directions.

Platform 5 is used by down trains to Caterham, Tattenham Corner and Three Bridges

Ticket gates became operational in April 2009.

== Services ==
Services at South Croydon are operated by Southern and Thameslink using Class 377 and 700 EMUs.

The typical off-peak service in trains per hour is:

- 2 tph to London Bridge
- 2 tph to Bedford via London Bridge
- 2 tph to Caterham and Tattenham Corner, dividing and attaching at Purley
- 2 tph to Three Bridges via Redhill

Preceding station	National Rail	Following station
East Croydon	Southern Brighton Main Line Stopping Services	Purley Oaks
East Croydon	Thameslink Brighton Main Line	Purley
East Croydon	Southern Oxted Line Peak Hours Only	Sanderstead
East Croydon	Thameslink Bedford to East Grinstead Peak Hours Only	Sanderstead

== Connections ==
London Buses routes 64, 403, 412 and 433 serve the station.
