= Haywards Heath Tunnel =

Railway tunnel in West Sussex, England

Coordinates: 50.982°N 0.090°W

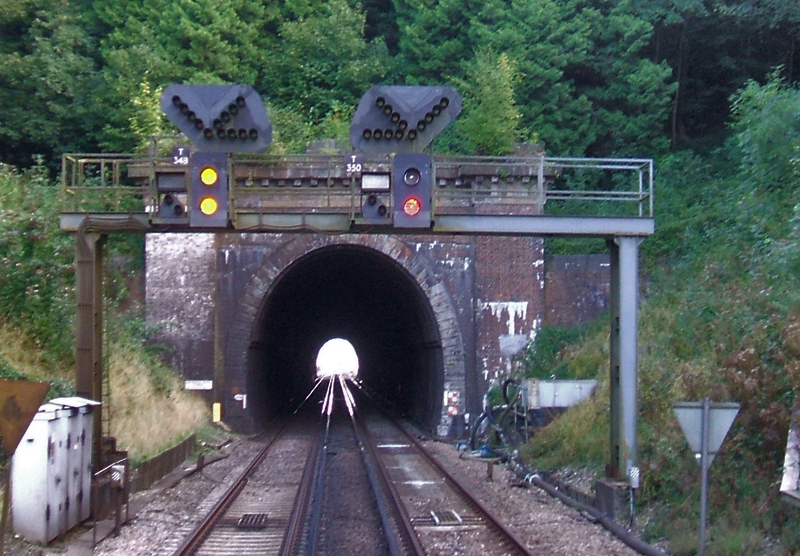
Southern portal of Haywards Heath tunnel

Haywards Heath Tunnel is a railway tunnel on the Brighton Main Line between Haywards Heath and Wivelsfield. It is 264 yards (241 metres) long and is one of the shortest tunnels on the line.

It has previously been incorrectly called 'Folly Hill tunnel', possibly by people misreading J.T. Howard Turner's comment on page 121, Vol 1 of his history of the London, Brighton and South Coast Railway.

The previously attributed 1841 accident at this tunnel was in fact at the deep Folly Hill cutting, one mile (1.6 km) to the south, which had originally been cut as a temporary tunnel before being opened out. Both areas feature sandstone which required blasting and the mix of soils at the Haywards Heath site caused numerous difficulties for the contractors. The delays in and around this tunnel contributed to the phased opening of the line, which finally opened throughout on 21 Sept 1841.

Water ingress at the tunnel has always been a problem and a Board of Trade report from May 1848 held at The National Archive details remedial works to drain excess water from entering the tunnel.

On 5 September 1945 an empty train of coaching stock ran through the buffers of a siding leading up to the northern portal, crashing into the abutment wall, killing the crew. A transcript of the Mid Sussex Time report is available on the Cuckfield Connections site. A Ministry of Transport report of the incident is available on the Railway Archives site.

Between October 2018 and February 2019, Haywards Heath tunnel was subject to a series of scheduled repairs as part of a £300m improvement programme on the Brighton Main Line; work was undertaken to reduce the ingress of water and re-lay the tracks during temporary closures.
