= South Croydon rail crash =

1947 railway accident in South Croydon, England

Coordinates: 51°21′25″N 0°5′33″W

Details
- Date: 24 October 1947; 08:37
- Location: South Croydon, Surrey
- Country: England
- Line: Brighton Main Line
- Operator: Southern Railway
- Cause: Signalman error

Statistics
- Trains: 2
- Passengers: ~1,800
- Deaths: 32
- Injured: 183

The South Croydon rail crash on the British railway system occurred on 24 October 1947.

The crash took place south of South Croydon railway station. Two electric commuter trains collided in fog and 32 people were killed, including the driver of the second train. It was the worst accident on Britain's Southern Railway.

The crash was a rear-end collision caused by a signalman's error. The inexperienced signalman at Purley Oaks forgot about a train from Haywards Heath to London Bridge standing invisible in the fog. The line was protected by the Sykes "Lock and Block" apparatus, which prevented him from allowing another train into the section until the preceding one had left it. However, he believed that the elderly apparatus was faulty and used a release key. This allowed a train from Tattenham Corner to London Bridge into the same section, and they collided near South Croydon Junction. The trains were crowded in the rush hour, carrying 800 and 1000 people respectively, hence the heavy death toll.

== 1854 accident ==
1854 Croydon rail accident

Details
- Date: 21 August 1854
- Location: Croydon, Surrey
- Country: England
- Service: Excursion train from Dover to Crystal Palace
- Incident type: Collision with stationary locomotive
- Cause: Lack of protection for locomotive taking water; following train unable to stop in time

Statistics
- Trains: 2
- Deaths: 3
- Injured: 11
- Damage: Locomotive and brake van derailed; carriages telescoped

On 21 August 1854, a railway accident occurred at Croydon station. At that time, trains on the railway line were operated at time intervals. This meant that after a train had departed from a station, another was only allowed to follow after a set time had passed. If a train stopped on the line, someone had to be sent back along the track to signal to the following train that the line was still occupied.

On this day, an excursion train from Dover carrying passengers who wanted to visit the Crystal Palace in London was en route to Crystal Palace station. The train was so overcrowded that it had to be divided at Ashton station. After the first part of the train passed through Croydon station, a steam locomotive moved onto the through track in order to take water from a water crane, without providing protection to the rear of this movement. As the location was very unclear, the following second part of the excursion train ran into the locomotive taking water. The locomotive of the excursion train and its following brake van derailed and were thrown off the curve. The following carriages telescoped into each other. Three people were killed, and 11 others were injured, some seriously.

== Later accidents ==
Other crashes, all caused by misuse of the Sykes release key or similar override mechanism, occurred at Battersea Park in 1937, Barnes in 1955 and Crayford railway station in 1959.
