= Purley Oaks railway station =

South London station on Brighton main line

Purley Oaks
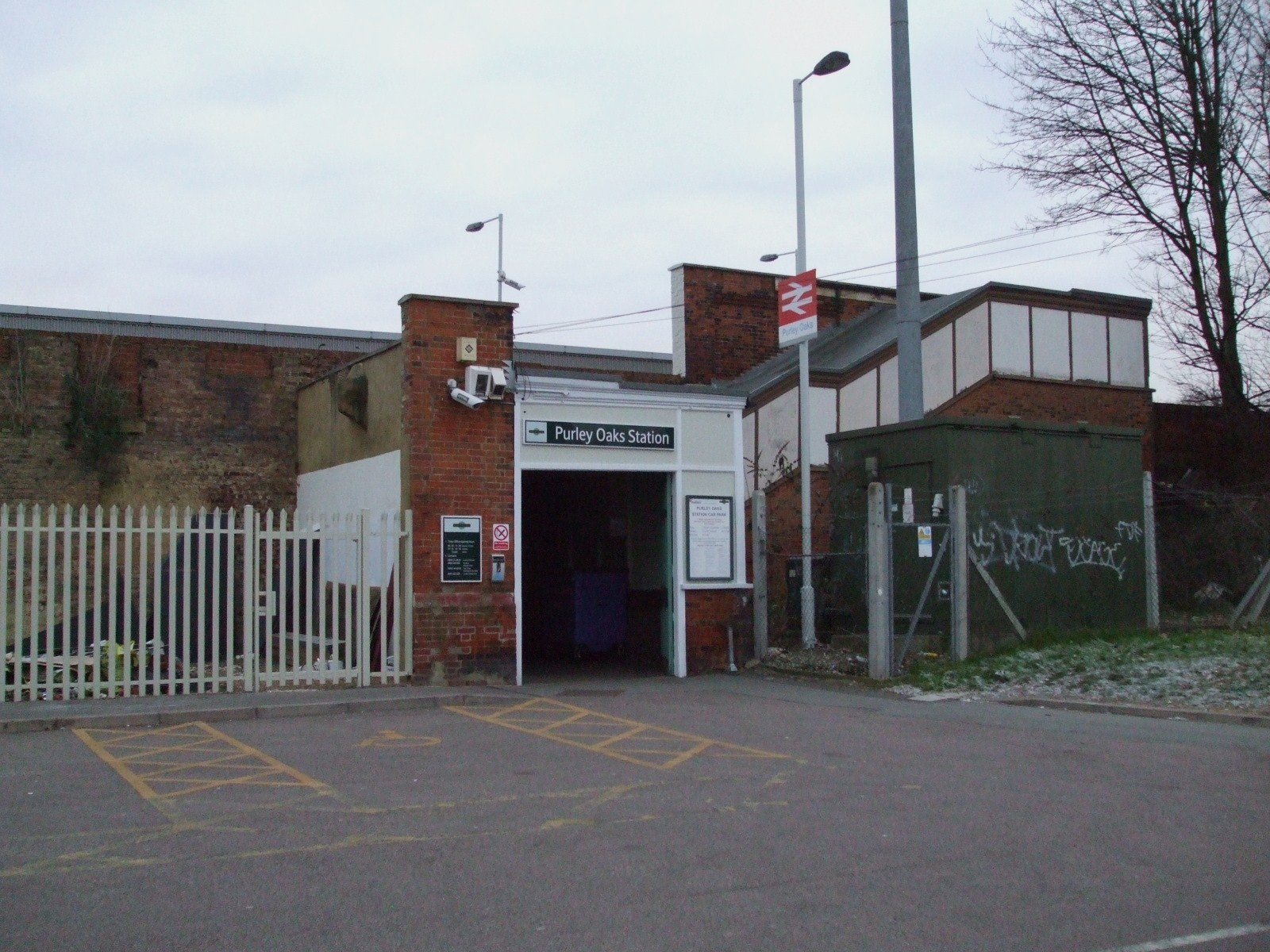
- West side view of the station
- Interactive map of Purley Oaks

General information
- Location: Sanderstead
- Local authority: London Borough of Croydon
- Managed by: Southern
- Station code: PUO
- DfT category: D
- Number of platforms: 4 (2 in use)
- Fare zone: 6

National Rail annual entry and exit
- 2020–21: ▼0.130 million
- 2021–22: ▲0.299 million
- 2022–23: ▲0.430 million
- 2023–24: ▲0.463 million
- 2024–25: ▲0.481 million

Key dates
- 5 November 1899: Opened

Other information
- External links: Departures; Facilities
- Coordinates: 51.347°N 0.099°W

Purley Oaks railway station is in the London Borough of Croydon in south London, on the Brighton Main Line 12 miles 34 chains (20.0 km) measured from London Bridge. All trains serving it are operated by Southern and it is in London fare zone 6. The station has four platforms: a side platform on the up fast line, an island platform with a face on the down fast line and an eastern face used by up trains, and a side platform on the eastern side used by down trains. There is also a pay-and-display car park at the station.

The ticket office (staffed for part of the day) is on the island platform with two self-service ticket machines in the subway beneath the station.

A short walk away from Purley Oaks is Sanderstead railway station, also in zone 6, with services to Victoria and East Grinstead.

== History ==
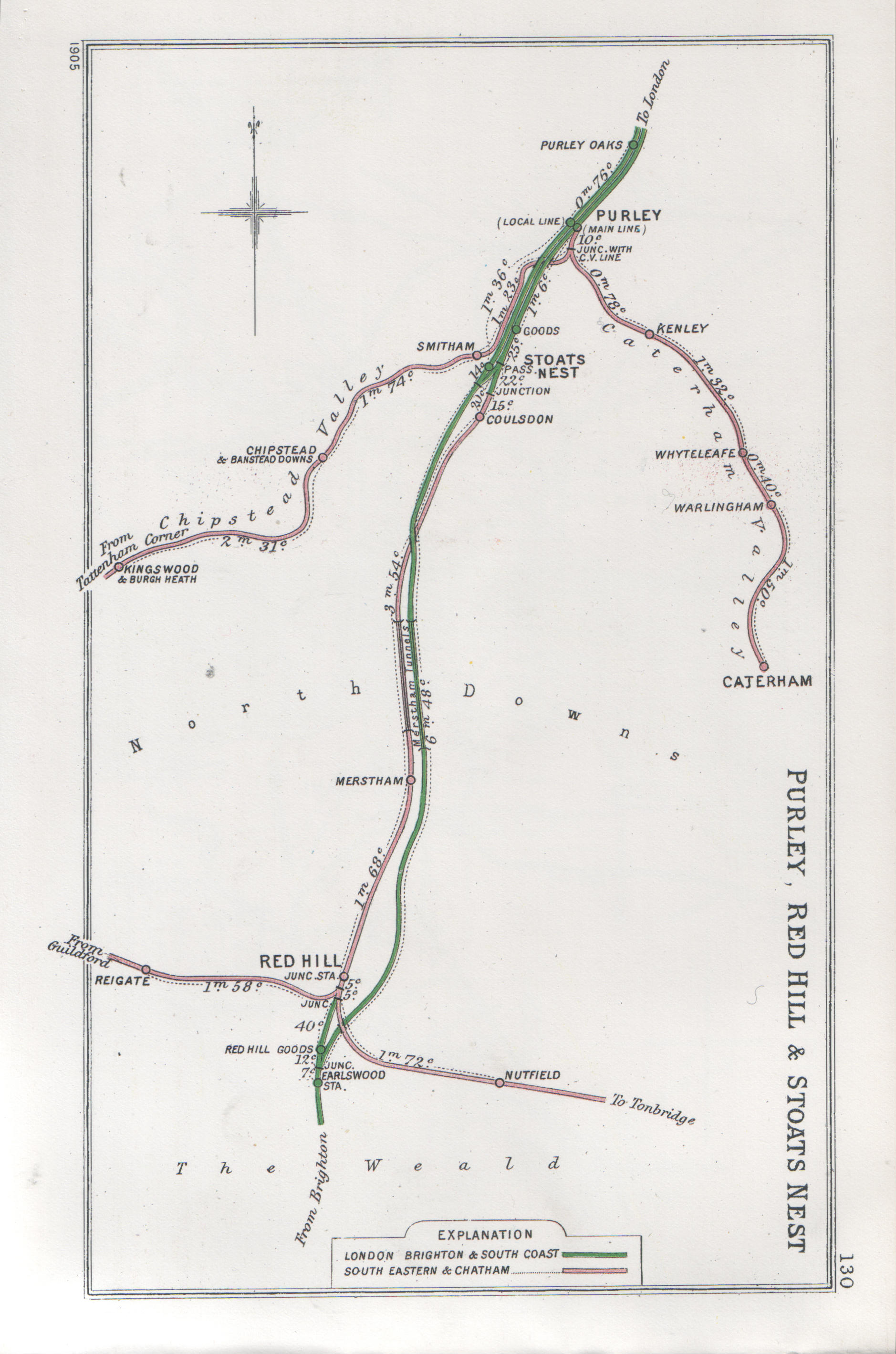
A 1905 Railway Clearing House map of lines around Purley Oaks.

The station was opened by the London Brighton and South Coast Railway on 5 November 1899 as part of the improvements to the main line and the opening of the Quarry Line.

Platform 1 was gutted by fire in 1989, destroying Croydon Model Railway Society's clubrooms.. Following the fire, the original station building became derelict and never reopened, and was subsequently demolished at some point between 2000 and 2005, leaving just the small entrance today on the west side..

== Services ==
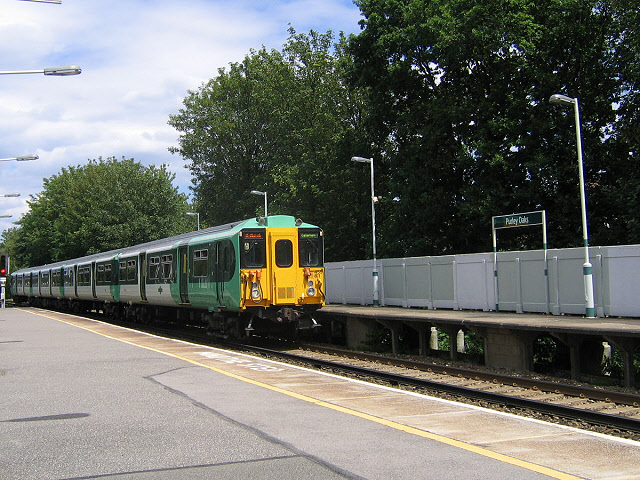
Southbound train calls at platform

All services at Purley Oaks are operated by Southern using Class 377 EMUs.

The typical off-peak service in trains per hour is:

- 2 tph to London Bridge (non-stop from Norwood Junction)
- 2 tph to Caterham and Tattenham Corner, dividing and attaching at Purley

There is one morning service from Gatwick Airport, which runs to London Victoria.

On Sundays, there is a half-hourly service between London Bridge and Caterham only. Passengers for Tattenham Corner have to change at Purley.

Preceding station	National Rail	Following station
South Croydon	Southern Brighton Main Line Stopping Services	Purley
