= Bermondsey dive-under =

Rail infrastructure in London

Coordinates: 51.4986°N 0.0757°W

A theoretical simple dive-under

The Bermondsey dive-under is a piece of rail infrastructure to the south of London Bridge Station in Bermondsey, London. A dive-under is where one set of rail lines tunnel under another set instead of crossing them on the level, this allows for independent running and increases the capacity of both tracks. For historical reasons, Bermondsey was a point of congestion where tracks from Kent heading to Charing Cross station had to cross the tracks coming from Sussex and running north to terminate at London Bridge or through to Blackfriars.

== History ==
Railway lines in south London wound over the docks and each other on long viaducts of brick arches. London Bridge railway station was opened in 1836 as a terminus for the London and Greenwich Railway, and remodelled several times before 1850 to accommodate more railway companies; London and Croydon Railway and London and Brighton Railway to the south, and South Eastern Railway to the north. The London and Croydon Railway and South Eastern Railway constructed a branchline and rival passenger terminal at Bricklayers Arms railway station in 1842 and closed it in 1845. This required a flat junction, on the viaduct, which was controlled by the first ever signal box. The signals and points contained some elements of interlocking.

The first example of a flying junction in the United Kingdom was the Weaver Junction that opened on 13 November 1881. Here the grade separation was used to raise one track over the oncoming mainline on a double junction.

In 2000, commuter services south of Thames were using the legacy tracks of a century earlier.

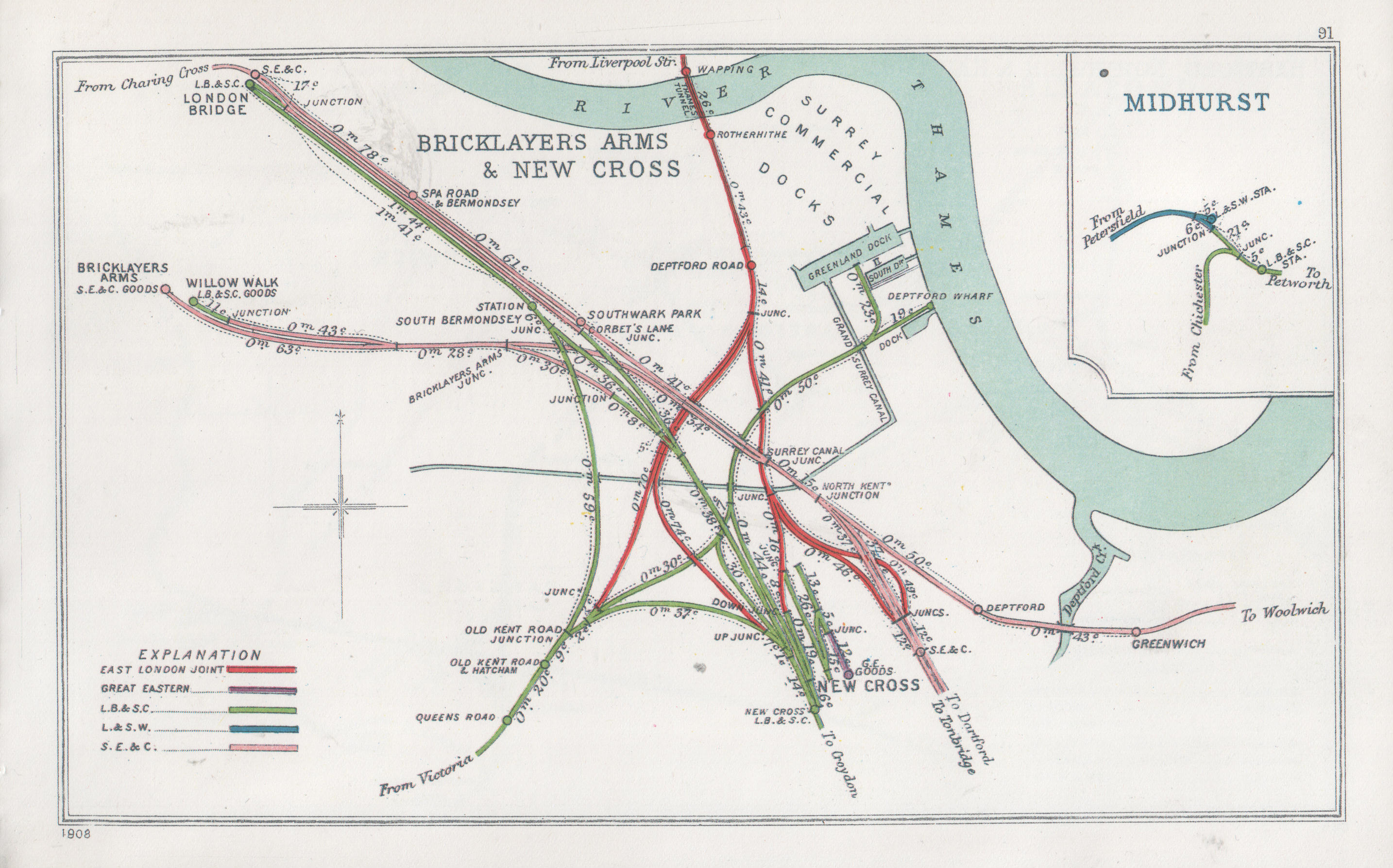
A 1908 Railway Clearing House map of lines around the approaches to London Bridge, including the western end of the Greenwich line

=== Construction history ===
Construction of the dive-under was complicated as existing services had to be maintained through the construction. Work commenced during 2013, with bridge-strengthening works near London Bridge station completed in June 2013. The first track was used for services from 27 December 2016, two new lines for SouthEastern traffic came into service after the August bank holiday. The overall programme of work was scheduled to be completed in January 2018.

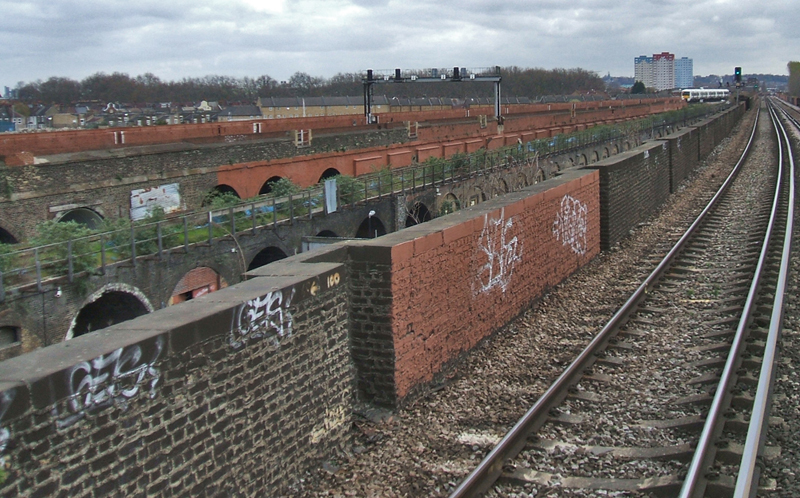
The overgrown spur line to the Bricklayers' Arms branch

- 2011 the Borough Market viaduct was completed, doubling the available tracks to the west of London Bridge station, it was commissioned in January 2016.
- Demolish Bricklayers Arms branch viaduct and rebuild to new profile in preparation for future use.
- Restricted timetable imposed
- Southeastern lines 3 & 4 were taken out of use and realigned. These were temporarily resignalled as lines 5 & 6, and used while lines 5 & 6 were taken out.
- Dive downs constructed. Side walls constructed. Piling.
- The dive-under box was built. This took a year to complete.
- Trackbed for the terminating Brighton slow downline laid and tested, and is operational on 27 December 2016 giving 3 line running capacity.
- Later, in August 2017, the Charing Cross tracks were diverted to their new permanent route using the dive-under, freeing the rest of the Southeastern part of the site for the installation of the final layout during 2018. At the same time work preparation was made for the new Thameslink dedicated tracks, ready to open the new through route via London Bridge.
- In January 2018 the new Thameslink London Bridge route opens. In December 2018, the timetable made its annual change.

== Description ==
London Bridge is the fourth busiest station in the United Kingdom, serving around 54–56 million passengers a year.

Previously, northbound Thameslink trains arrived into London Bridge to the south of the Kent lines. Thameslink trains needed to use the pair of tracks to the north, and Charing Cross trains needed to use the new pair of tracks to the south. The Brighton Main Line terminates here.

In simplest terms, the existing Charing Cross tracks dive under two tracks now reallocated to the new dedicated Thameslink service. Most tracks seen from above remain in roughly the same location as before though scheme there is a slight realignment to allow the two critical Thameslink and Charing Cross services routes to switch over from one side to the other. The changes to the vertical height of the tracks are significant. There are tight constraints both vertically and horizontally.

The modification was undertaken to the east of London Bridge so that Thameslink trains from the Brighton Main Line can use a grade-separated crossover to avoid impeding trains from Kent bound for Charing Cross. The Charing Cross services on the Kent lines are diverted slightly south in the vicinity of Trundleys Road onto the route of the former Bricklayers' Arms branch line. They then slope up alongside the Brighton Main Line just north of South Bermondsey station. Thameslink trains in both directions cross over the Kent lines on a new bridge, meeting the existing alignment just north of Jarrow Road.
