= Battersea Park rail crash =

1937 railway accident in London, England

Coordinates: 51°28′24″N 0°08′56″W

Details
- Date: 2 April 1937; 08:02
- Location: Battersea Park railway station
- Country: England
- Line: South London Line
- Operator: Southern Railway
- Cause: Signaller's error

Statistics
- Trains: 2
- Passengers: 350–400
- Deaths: 10
- Injured: 80 (7 serious)

The Battersea Park rail crash occurred on 2 April 1937, just south of Battersea Park railway station on the Southern Railway, in London, England. Two electrically driven passenger trains collided on the Up Local line; the second train, from Coulsdon North to Victoria, had been allowed into the section while it was still occupied by the first train, from London Bridge to Victoria. The signalman at Battersea Park, G. F. Childs, believing there was a fault with the Sykes electromechanical interlocking apparatus which was installed at the box, had opened up the case of the instrument and inadvertently cleared the interlock which should have prevented this situation. The official enquiry ruled that he subsequently accepted the Coulsdon train, although he should have been aware that the London Bridge train had not cleared the section. Ten people were killed, including the guard of the London Bridge train, and eighty people were injured, seven sustaining serious injuries. Another accident had occurred at Battersea Park in 1881.

== Sequence of events ==
On 2 April 1937, Battersea Park signal box was operated by Relief Signalman G. F. Childs, rather than the usual signalman (F. W. Harvey). Although Childs was a very experienced and well-respected signalman within the SR, and had been passed as competent to operate the box two weeks previously, this was the first time he had operated it unsupervised, and he had never operated it during the morning rush-hour. During the course of the morning, he made several mistakes, the last one of which was the direct cause of the accident.

The various boxes on this section of the railway used Sykes electromechanical "Lock and Block" interlocking, which used treadles to detect the presence of trains on the line rather than electrical track circuits, and prevented unsafe signal indications by mechanically locking the signal slides in the box, rather than interrupting an electrical circuit. A feature of the Sykes system was that the various actions needed to set up a route for a train and clear the appropriate signals had to be completed in the correct order, otherwise the apparatus would lock up and require releasing. On the boxes to the south of Battersea Park, the apparatus could be released by the signalman alone using a key, but Battersea Park and the boxes to the north required the signalman to request a release from the next box in the chain – for Battersea Park, this was Battersea Pier box. This procedure required the signalman making the request to send a bell signal, then for both signalmen to press the appropriate button in their respective boxes – the interlocking would only be released if both buttons were pressed simultaneously.

Childs' first mistake occurred at approximately 0605, when his apparatus locked up after the passage of a boat train. In his evidence to the enquiry, he described this as a "treadle failure", but it was ruled that the lock-up had been due to his operation of two signals in the wrong order. He was able to clear the interlocking in this case without requiring permission from any other box.

Between 0757 and 0804, no fewer than ten trains were due to pass Battersea Park, and Childs was working under considerable pressure. The three trains directly involved in the accident were the 0737 train from London Bridge to Victoria, referred to in the report as the "South London" train, the 0730 from London Bridge to Victoria via Tulse Hill, referred to as the "London Bridge" train, and the 0731 from Coulsdon to Victoria, the "Coulsdon" train. All three trains were due to depart Battersea Park on the Up Local line, the South London train from the Wandsworth Road line, and the other two from the Clapham Junction line; the box immediately on the country side of this line from Battersea Park was Pouparts Junction. Childs accepted the South London train at 0758, and the London Bridge train at 0759, intending to hold the London Bridge train at the Up Local home signal until the South London train had cleared the section. He made his second mistake at this point; he failed to put the switch-hook on the Clapham line Up Local plunger, which had to be pressed to accept a train on the line. The switch-hook would both mechanically prevent the plunger being depressed, and electrically prevent the block indicator at Pouparts Junction from showing "Line Clear".

While attempting to allow the South London train into the station, Childs made his third mistake; he attempted to clear the home signal for this train before setting the points correctly. This again caused the Sykes apparatus to lock up, and, on this occasion, it would have to be released by Battersea Pier box. Childs sent the bell signal, but (his fourth mistake), he pressed the wrong release button, leaving the apparatus locked. Rather than attempting the release again, or contacting Battersea Pier by telephone to investigate the problem, Childs assumed the apparatus had failed, and decided to open the case and reset it manually. He was permitted to do this by the regulations then in force, but this procedure should only have been used in an emergency. While resetting the signal slide for the South London train, Childs inadvertently also cleared the interlock for the London Bridge train, which was still standing at the home signal. This caused the block indicator at Pouparts Junction to return to "Line Clear", as it was not being held on by the switch-hook circuit.

The signalman at Pouparts Junction (T. P. G. Hillman) then offered the Coulsdon train forward. He should not have done this until he had received the "Train out of Section" bell signal for the London Bridge train, which Childs denied that he had sent. The enquiry made no definite ruling on this point – it was possible that Hillman had mistaken another bell signal relating to a down train for the "Train out of Section" signal. However, Childs' fifth and fatal mistake then occurred. He pressed the plunger to accept the Coulsdon train, and, as the enquiry ruled, sent the acceptance bell signal to Hillman. Hillman cleared his signals, and the Coulsdon train entered the occupied section at approximately 40 mph.

The driver of the Coulsdon train initially thought that the London Bridge train was on another line, and only realised there was a conflict a few seconds before the accident. He made an emergency brake application, but the speed was not significantly reduced. The leading car of the Coulsdon train overrode the rear car of the London Bridge train, completely destroying the wooden bodywork of all but one of its compartments. Nine of the ten fatalities occurred in this car. The leading car of the Coulsdon train also suffered considerable damage, but there was no significant damage to any other car of either train, and neither train derailed.

== Causes ==
The immediate cause of the accident was Childs' acceptance of the Coulsdon train into the occupied section. The interlocking apparatus should have prevented him doing so, but his interference with it, and his failure to apply the switch-hook, rendered the interlocking ineffective.

== Recommendations ==
The enquiry recommended that the paragraph of the rules which permitted signalmen to manually reset the apparatus in an emergency should be deleted, so that any such maintenance tasks would only be performed by qualified linemen, and that the conversion of the signalling in the area from electromechanical interlocking to entirely electrical track circuiting should be expedited.
