= Balcombe (disambiguation) =

Balcombe may refer to:

- Balcombe, West Sussex, England
  - Balcombe railway station
  - Balcombe tunnel
- Balcombe Street Siege, IRA incident in London

== People with the surname ==
- David Balcombe (born 1984), cricketer
- Ellery Balcombe (born 1999), English footballer
- Graham Balcombe (1907–2000), pioneer cave diver
- Ronnia Durham-Balcombe, Saint Vincent and the Grenadines politician
