= Ardingly railway station =

Disused railway station in Ardingly, West Sussex

Coordinates: 51.0321°N 0.0904°W

Ardingly
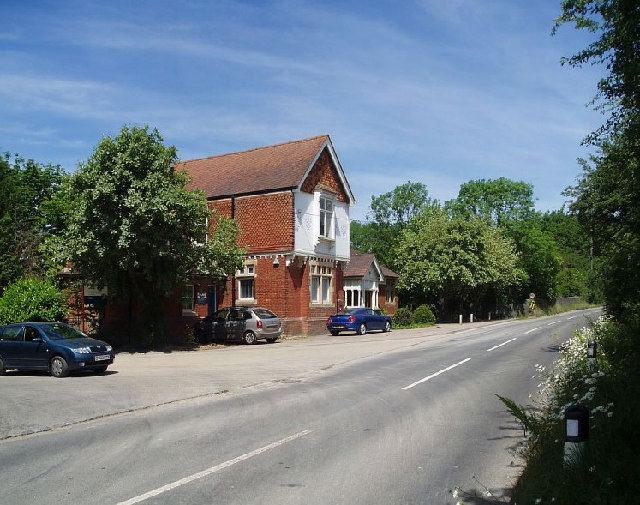
- Ardingly station building, 2005

General information
- Location: Ardingly, Mid Sussex, West Sussex; England
- Grid reference: TQ338276
- Platforms: 2

Other information
- Status: Disused

History
- Pre-grouping: London, Brighton and South Coast Railway
- Post-grouping: Southern Railway; Southern Region of British Railways; Aggregates depot

Key dates
- 3 September 1883: Opened
- 7 July 1935: Ardingly branch electrified
- 2 April 1962: Closed to freight
- 28 October 1963: Closed to passengers
- 1963: Aggregates depot opened in goods yard
Location

Ardingly was a railway station which served the West Sussex village of the same name in England. It was opened on 3 September 1883 by the London, Brighton and South Coast Railway (LBSCR). It was closed eighty years later and is currently used as an aggregates depot. The Bluebell Railway owns the trackbed from just east of the station to Horsted Keynes and has long-term plans to rebuild the line.

== History ==
=== Opening and route ===
The LBSCR opened a 4 1/2-mile (7.2 km) link line between Horsted Keynes on its Lewes to East Grinstead Line and Haywards Heath on the Brighton Main Line. Doubled throughout, the line curved away from Horsted Keynes over Sheriff Mill Viaduct (117 yards (107 m) and named after the nearby Lower Sheriff Farm), climbing on a gradient to reach Lywood Tunnel (218 yards (199 m)) before continuing on the level for nearly 2 miles (3.2 km) to reach the line's only intermediate station at Ardingly.

From Ardingly, the line continued for a further mile to reach Copyhold Junction on the Brighton Line, just south of the Ouse Valley Viaduct. At first there was no signal box at the junction, with services running on an independent line parallel to the Brighton Main Line as far as the north-facing bay platform at Haywards Heath. A box was installed in 1912 which remained in use until 1932, when Haywards Heath was rebuilt with up and down loop platforms, and a new box brought into service there.

The line opened without ceremony, with the first service, a goods train, leaving Haywards Heath at 8.34am to collect freight at Ardingly and continue to Horsted Keynes. The line was later to prove its worth in both wars as a useful alternative to the Brighton Main Line, and for specials to Lingfield Racecourse.

=== Station building and facilities ===
Designed by Thomas Harrison Myres, the main station building was sited at road level, away from the platforms. In common with other Lewes and East Grinstead line stations, it was constructed in a neo-Queen Anne style and presented as a two-storey Victorian country cottage. The upper storey projects slightly and is decoratively timbered with plaster patterning (flower patterns in black on a white background). Unlike the other stations on the line, Ardingly was never tile-hung.

The station's two platforms had fairly basic facilities, with platform awnings and an alcove-like waiting room on the down platform. There was a platform signal cabin at the western end of the station, controlling a small goods yard. The yard saw considerable inward traffic of timber for a local sawmill, which was subsequently dispatched back out in consignments of prepared boards. The station was run by a staff of four: the stationmaster, signal porter, porter and assistant clerk. The last stationmaster left in 1926, at which point Ardingly came under the control of Horsted Keynes.

=== Operations ===
Under the LBSCR, the Ardingly branch had a very infrequent service and, following the 1921 grouping, after which the Southern Railway took over the line, it was mainly served by push-pull trains, with some through services to and from Brighton. Following electrification in 1935, the new electric service comprised 18 trains on an hourly service to and from Horsted Keynes, around half of which terminated at Haywards Heath, whilst the rest ran as far as Seaford. The Ardingly branch was closed on Sundays until 1945, and the connection from the up Ardingly line to the up Horsted Keynes main platform was severed.

Camping coaches were stationed at Ardingly from the summer of 1930 until the end of the war, an acknowledgement of Ardingly's popularity amongst ramblers, who were ferried to and from the station in special trains. The station was busy at the beginning and end of term at Ardingly College, when up to 450 packages of luggage were sent and received for around 250 pupils.

=== Closure ===
After the closure of the Lewes to East Grinstead line by British Railways (BR), in 1958, the down line between Horsted Keynes and Ardingly was used as a siding for condemned Kent Coast steam stock and new electric stock, whilst single-line working with electric train staff was introduced on the up line. The branch was itself closed on 28 October 1963. However, the section was still used occasionally to transport rolling stock to the newly established Bluebell Railway, and the last movement along the line was recorded on 13 May 1964, when Terrier No 32636 passed through prior to lifting of the track.

The lifting, which commenced on 15 July, reached Horsted Keynes by 21 September. During the summer of 1968, Sheriff Mill Viaduct was demolished because the Mid Sussex District Council wanted to straighten the bend on New Lane where it curved under the viaduct, and BR was happy to be relieved of the maintenance costs of the structure. The Bluebell Railway had been invited to purchase the line after closure but could not afford BR's asking price of between £25,000-£30,000, together with the £10,000 needed to maintain the viaduct.

Preceding station	Disused railways	Following station
Horsted Keynes; Line closed, station open	London, Brighton and South Coast Railway; Lewes and East Grinstead Railway	Haywards Heath; Line closed, station open

== Present day ==
An Amey Roadstone plant (now Heidelberg Materials UK) was established in the Ardingly goods yard shortly after closure of the line, and was served by a daily freight working from Haywards Heath using the former down local line. Access to the up main and up local lines at Copyhold Junction was severed. The company demolished the station platforms, except for a short length of the former up platform near the road bridge. The track in the station was removed and a loop installed at the southern end of the former goods yard area. The station buildings remained, used by Hanson Aggregates as offices. A pair of ornamental cast iron station canopy brackets, and the ticket office window, were sold as lots 302 and 303 by auctioneers T. Bannister & Co. at the Ardingly historic vehicle spectacular show at the South of England Showground in July 1983.

=== Preservation future ===
In 1997, the Heritage Bluebell Railway acquired the trackbed as far as the Aggregate Depot boundary at Ardingly, and has long-term aspirations to restore and reopen the branch. To help bridge the gap created by the missing Sheriff Mill viaduct, spoil from the excavation of Imberhorne cutting (part of the works necessary for the Bluebell's extension to East Grinstead) was used to extend existing embankments towards Ardingly. Re-signalling work had also taken place at Horsted Keynes, with signals being installed in preparation for the eventual re-laying of the track. Mid Sussex District Council has accordingly safeguarded the route of the line from re-development that would prejudice its reinstatement. Two public consultation sessions were held at Ardingly in September 2022, to set out proposals which were submitted to Mid-Sussex District Council.

== Sources ==
- Butt, R. V. J. (October 1995). The Directory of Railway Stations: details every public and private passenger station, halt, platform and stopping place, past and present (1st ed.). Sparkford: Patrick Stephens Ltd. ISBN 978-1-85260-508-7. OCLC 60251199. OL 11956311M.
- Clinker, C.R. (October 1978). Clinker's Register of Closed Passenger Stations and Goods Depots in England, Scotland and Wales 1830-1977. Bristol: Avon-AngliA Publications & Services. ISBN 0-905466-19-5.
- Jowett, Alan (2000). Jowett's Nationalised Railway Atlas (1st ed.). Penryn, Cornwall: Atlantic Transport Publishers. ISBN 978-0-906899-99-1. OCLC 228266687.
- Marx, Klaus (2000). An Illustrated History of the Lewes & East Grinstead Railway. Shepperton, Surrey: Ian Allan Publishing. ISBN 0-86093-547-7.

== See also ==
- List of closed railway stations in Britain
