= WVF =

WVF may refer to:

- Wivelsfield railway station, a railway station in Sussex, England
- World Veterans Federation, the world's largest international veteran organisation
