= Burgess Hill railway station =

Railway station in West Sussex, England

Coordinates: 50°57′11″N 00°07′39″W

Burgess Hill
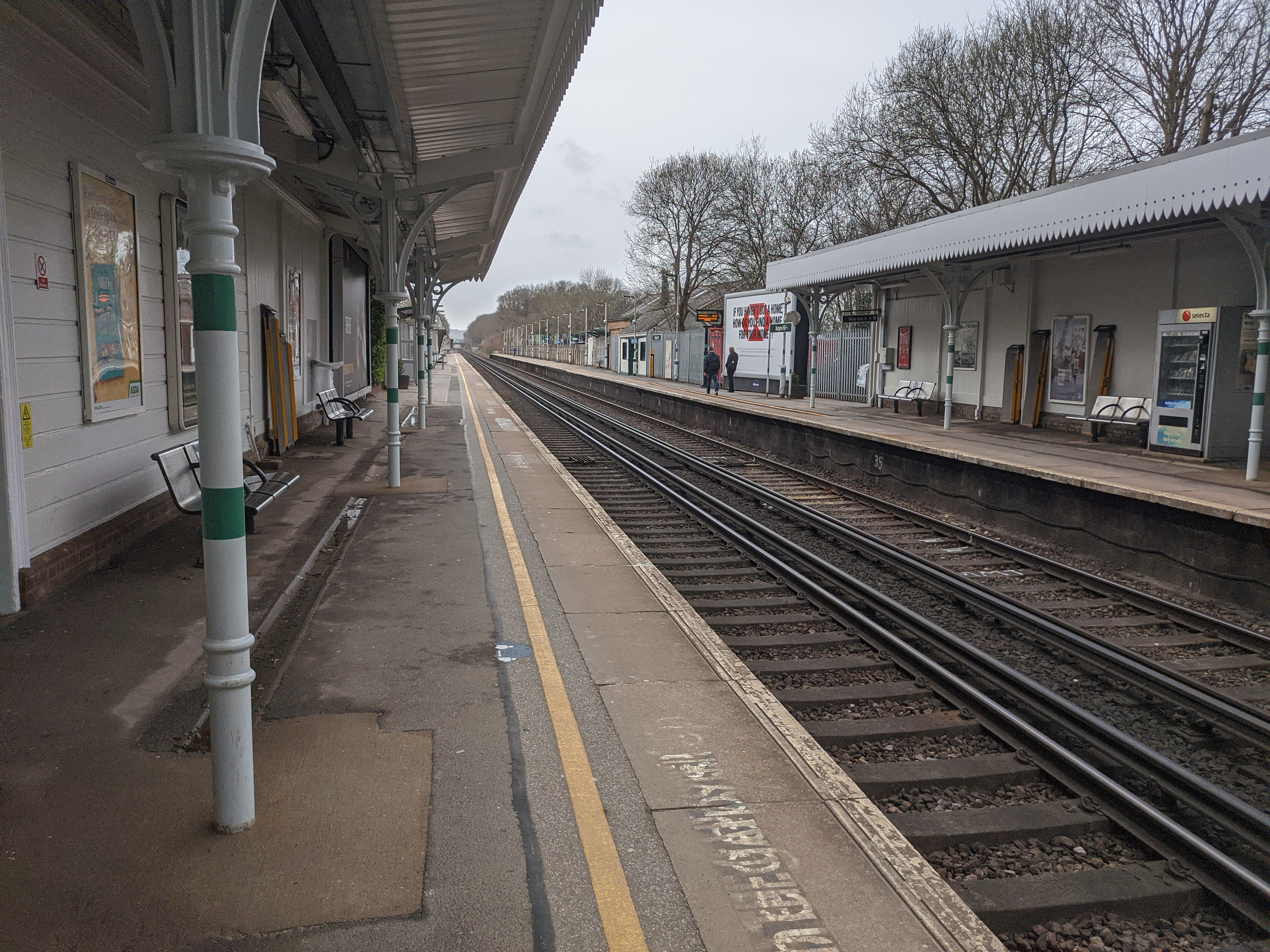

General information
- Location: Burgess Hill, District of Mid Sussex; England
- Grid reference: TQ316187
- Managed by: Southern
- Platforms: 2

Other information
- Station code: BUG
- Classification: DfT category C2

History
- Opened: 21 September 1841

Passengers
- 2020/21: ▼0.528 million
- 2021/22: ▲1.197 million
- 2022/23: ▲1.467 million
- 2023/24: ▲1.538 million
- 2024/25: ▲1.677 million
Location
Notes
- Passenger statistics from the Office of Rail and Road

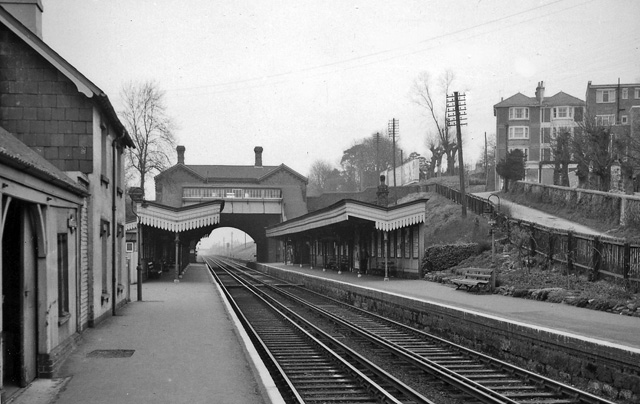
Northward view of the platforms in 1961

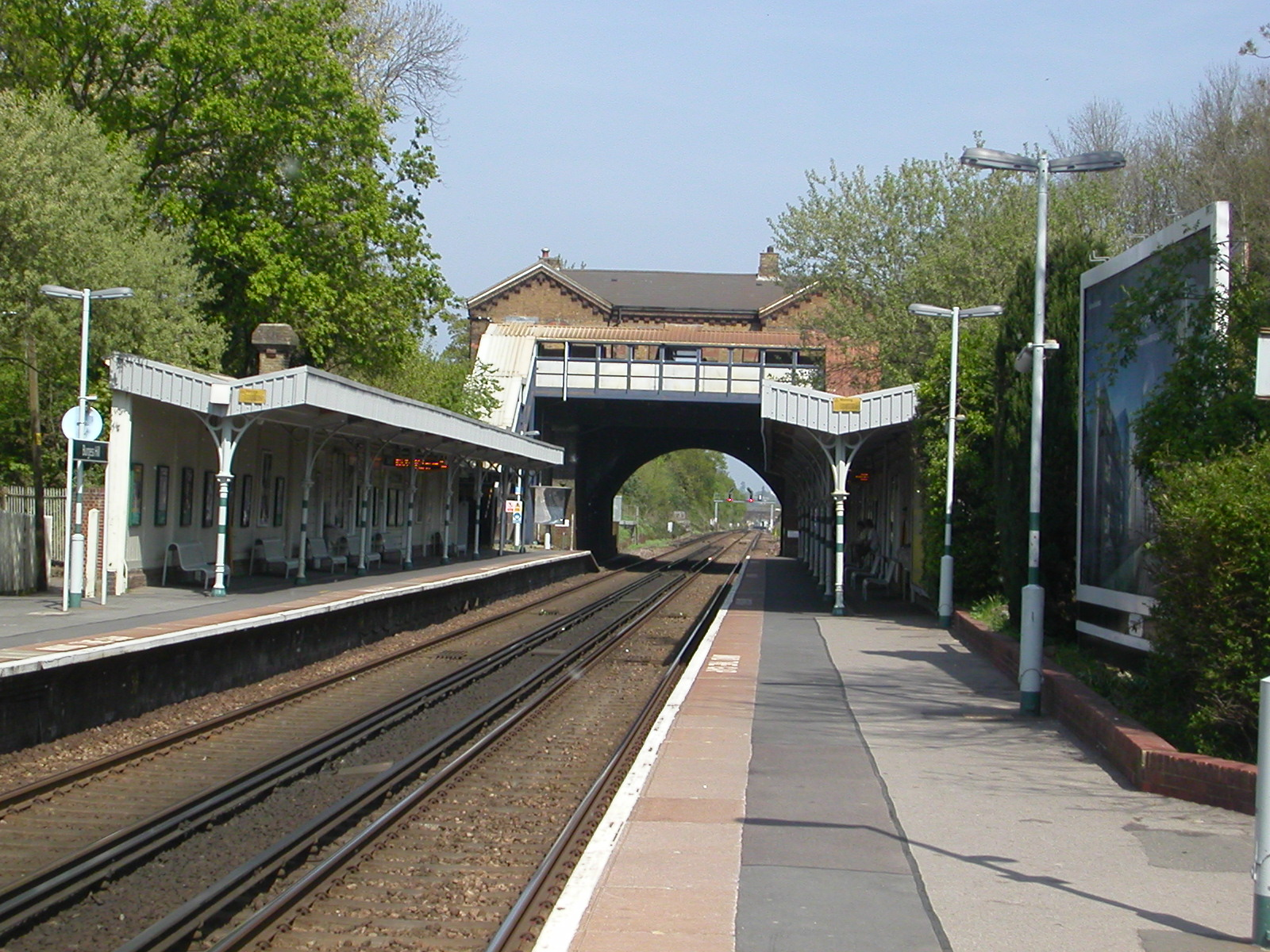
Northward view of the platforms in 2007

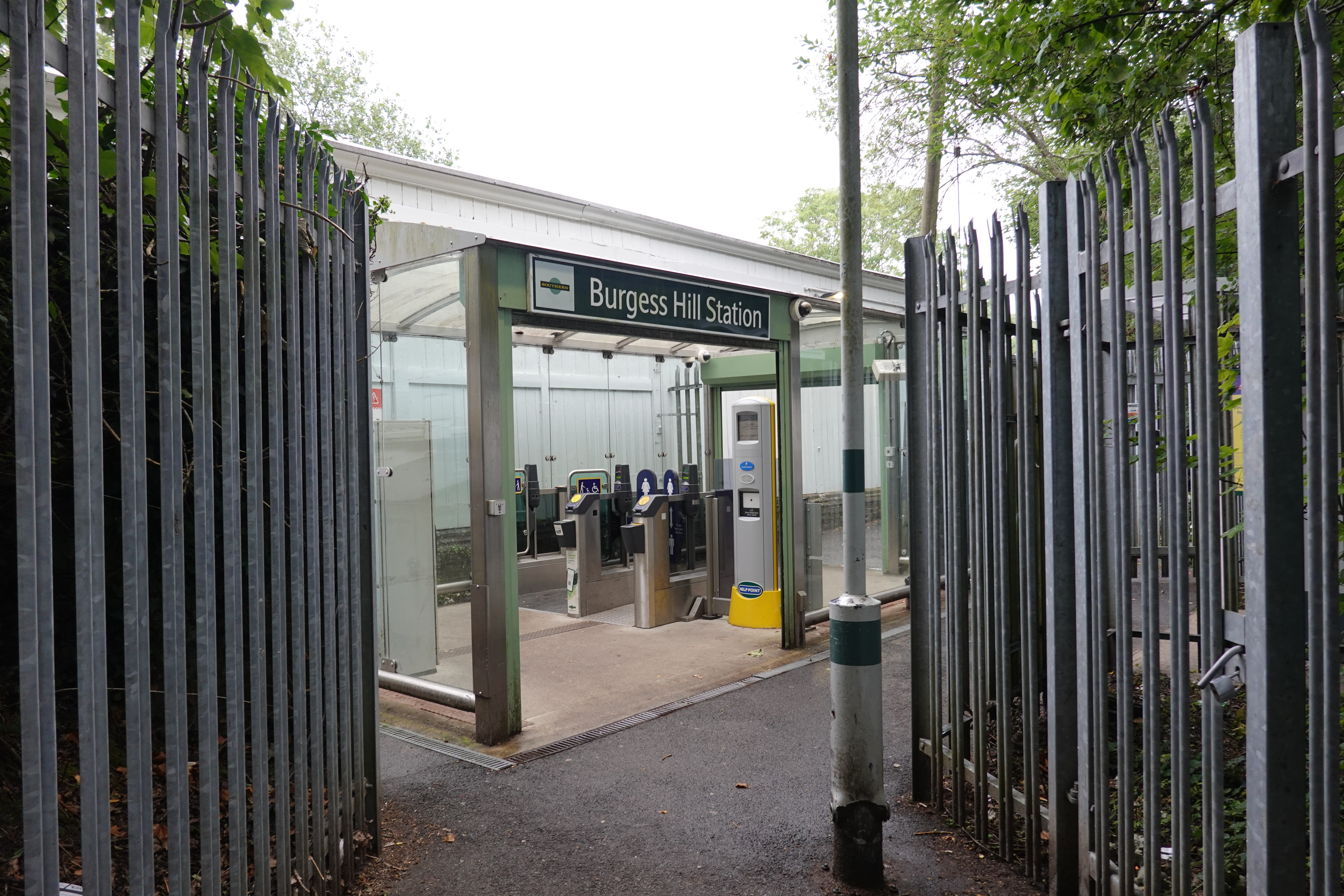
The side entrance to the station which leads directly onto northbound platform 1

Burgess Hill railway station is on the Brighton Main Line, serving the town of Burgess Hill, West Sussex. It is 41 miles 39 chains (66.8 km) down the line from London Bridge via Redhill and is situated between Wivelsfield and Hassocks on the main line. Train services are provided by Southern and Thameslink.

== History ==
The first station at Burgess Hill was opened on 21 September 1841 by the London and Brighton Railway (L&BR), at the time of the completion of the route to Brighton. The original facilities were all in the small wooden hut (which still stands as a refurbished waiting room on platform 1) and wooden platforms set beside the main line. The L&BR became the London Brighton and South Coast Railway (LB&SCR) in 1846 and a track plan of the station dating from 1874 shows that by then several sidings and a signal box had been constructed at the station.

The present station building dates from 1877 and is typical of LB&SCR stations of the period.

== Layout and facilities ==
The station has a typical double-track layout, with two side platforms each long enough to hold a 12-car train. Both platforms are signalled bidirectionally, but in normal service platform 1 is used by northbound services towards London (and beyond to Bedford and Cambridge), while platform 2 is for southbound trains to Brighton and Littlehampton. Both platforms are covered by shelters approximately four carriages long at the north end, and there are also smaller shelters further down the platforms. There is a small café and an accessible toilet located and large waiting room on platform 1 and a small waiting room on platform 2.

The station has two car parks: the main one next to platform 1 and a smaller one adjacent to platform 2. Both car parks include disabled parking spaces. The smaller car park near platform 2 also has an Amazon Locker.

There are three entrances/exits to and from the station, all featuring ticket barriers. The main entrance/exit is through the station building on Station Road, which includes the ticket office and also houses a small newsagent and a cash machine. Access to the platforms from the station building is via two sheltered sets of stairs, which also act as a footbridge between the two platforms. The other two entrances/exits link the platforms directly with the station's car parks. These entrances/exits are both fully wheelchair-accessible, but each one only connects directly to one of the platforms - access to the other platform is only via the aforementioned footbridge. This means that step-free access is available to both platforms, but step-free access between the two platforms is only possible by venturing outside the station. Ticket machines are located by each of the three entrances.

== Refurbishments ==
In November 2020, a £1.2 million refurbishment was carried out at Burgess Hill station. This introduced a new waiting room on the northbound platform 1, inside of the original 1841 building which was originally a parcels store. Another smaller waiting room was refurbished with new furniture on the southbound platform 2. Refurbishments were also carried out to the two 50 metre long platform canopies, replacing the original cast iron and timber structure with a more modern steel structure.

In May 2021, both platforms were repaved and yellow tactile paving was installed near the platform edge.

== Services ==
Off-peak, services at Burgess Hill are operated by Southern and Thameslink using Class 377 and 700 EMUs.

The typical off-peak service in trains per hour is:

- 2 tph to Bedford via London Bridge
- 2 tph to Cambridge via London Bridge
- 2 tph to London Victoria
- 4 tph to Brighton (2 of these run non-stop and 2 call at all stations)
- 2 tph to Littlehampton via Worthing

In addition, the station is served by a number of peak hour Gatwick Express services which usually pass through Burgess Hill. These services run non-stop from Gatwick Airport to London Victoria and are operated using Class 387 EMUs.

| Preceding station | National Rail | Following station |
|---|---|---|
| Wivelsfield or Haywards Heath | Thameslink Brighton Main Line | Hassocks or Brighton |
| Haywards Heath | Southern Brighton Main Line | Hassocks |
| Haywards Heath | Gatwick Express Brighton Main Line Peak Hours Only | Hassocks |

== Gallery ==
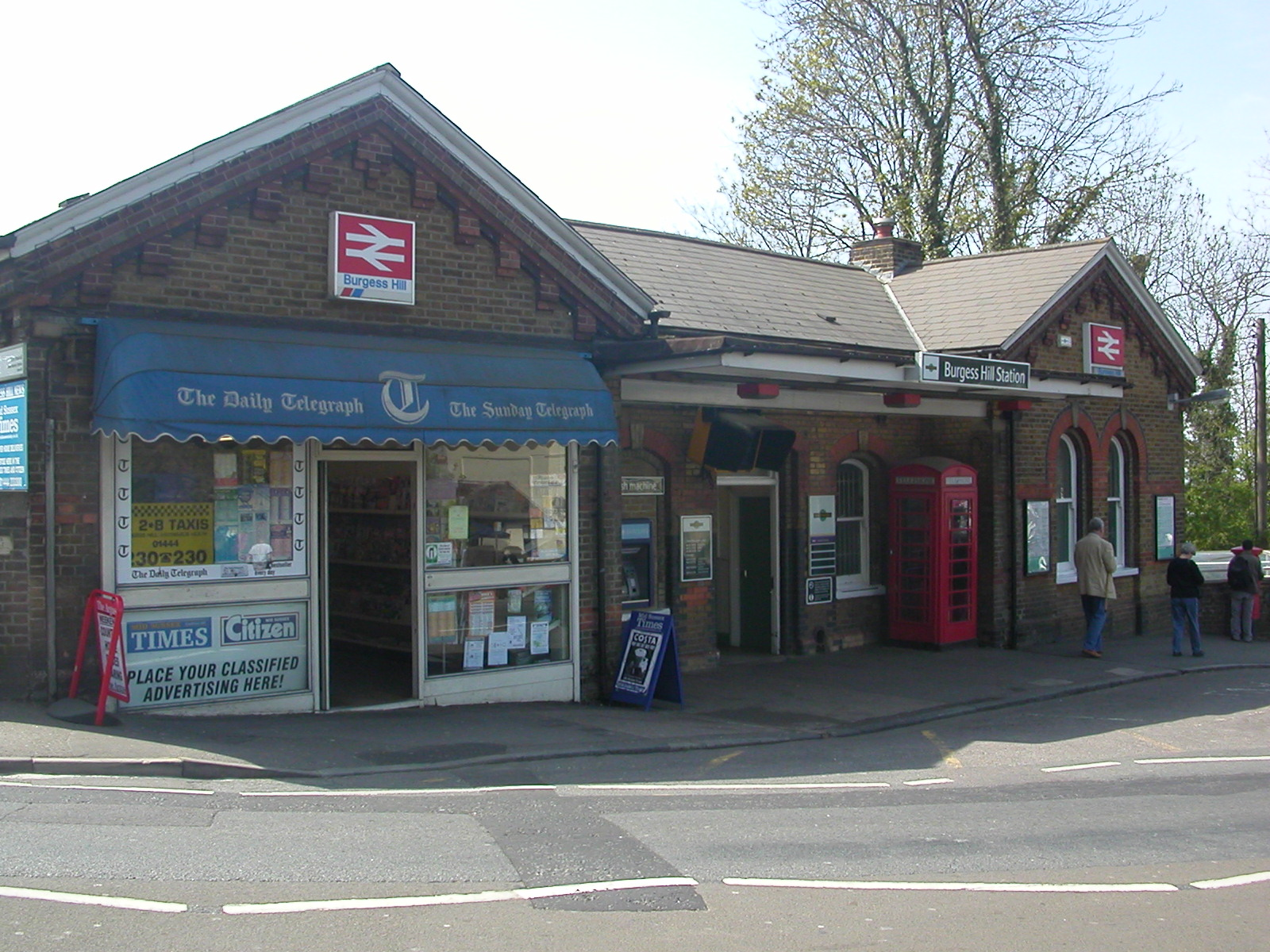
Main street-level building on Station Road, housing the ticket office and newsagent

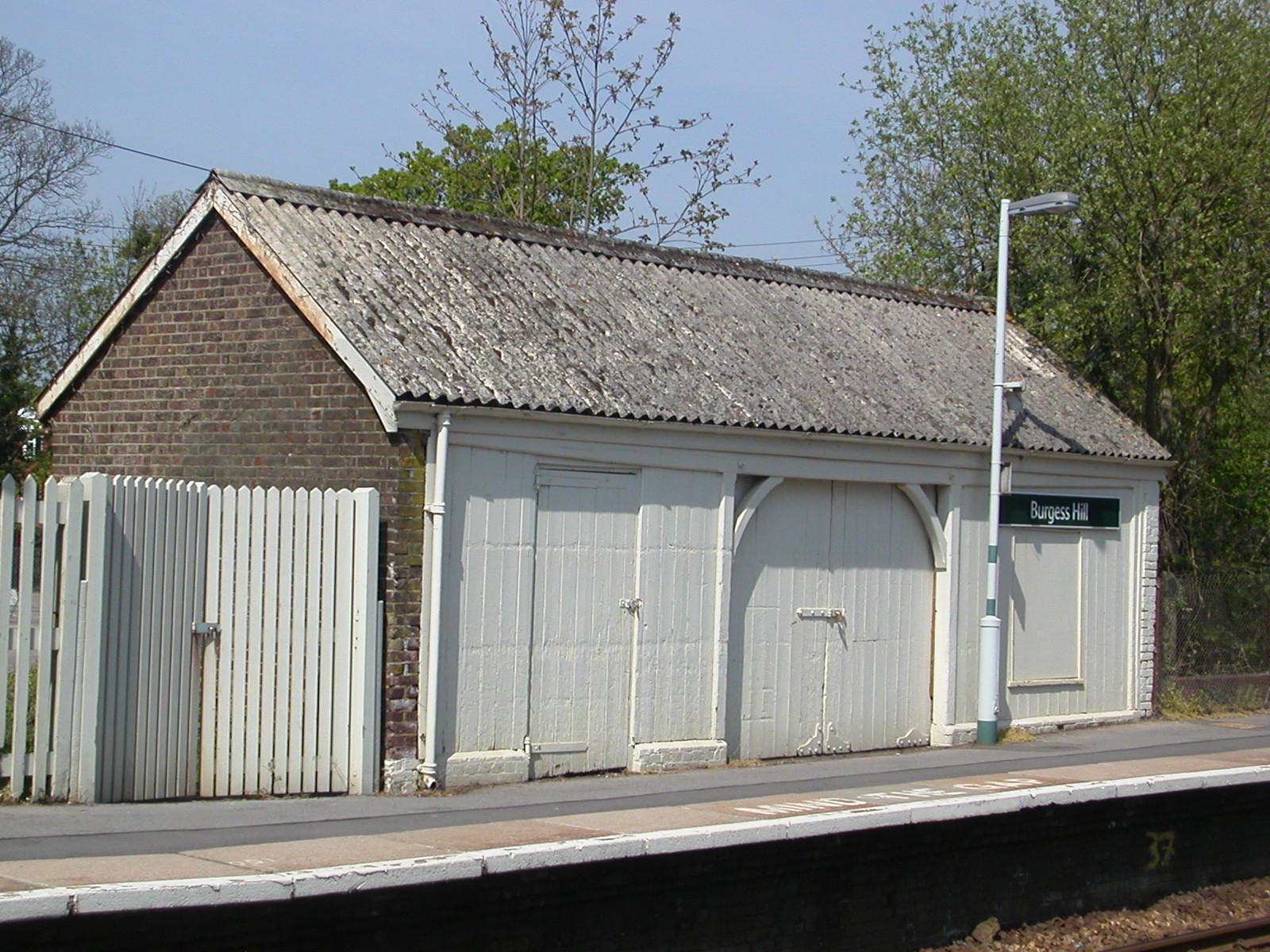
An original 1841 building (formerly a parcels store) on Platform 1

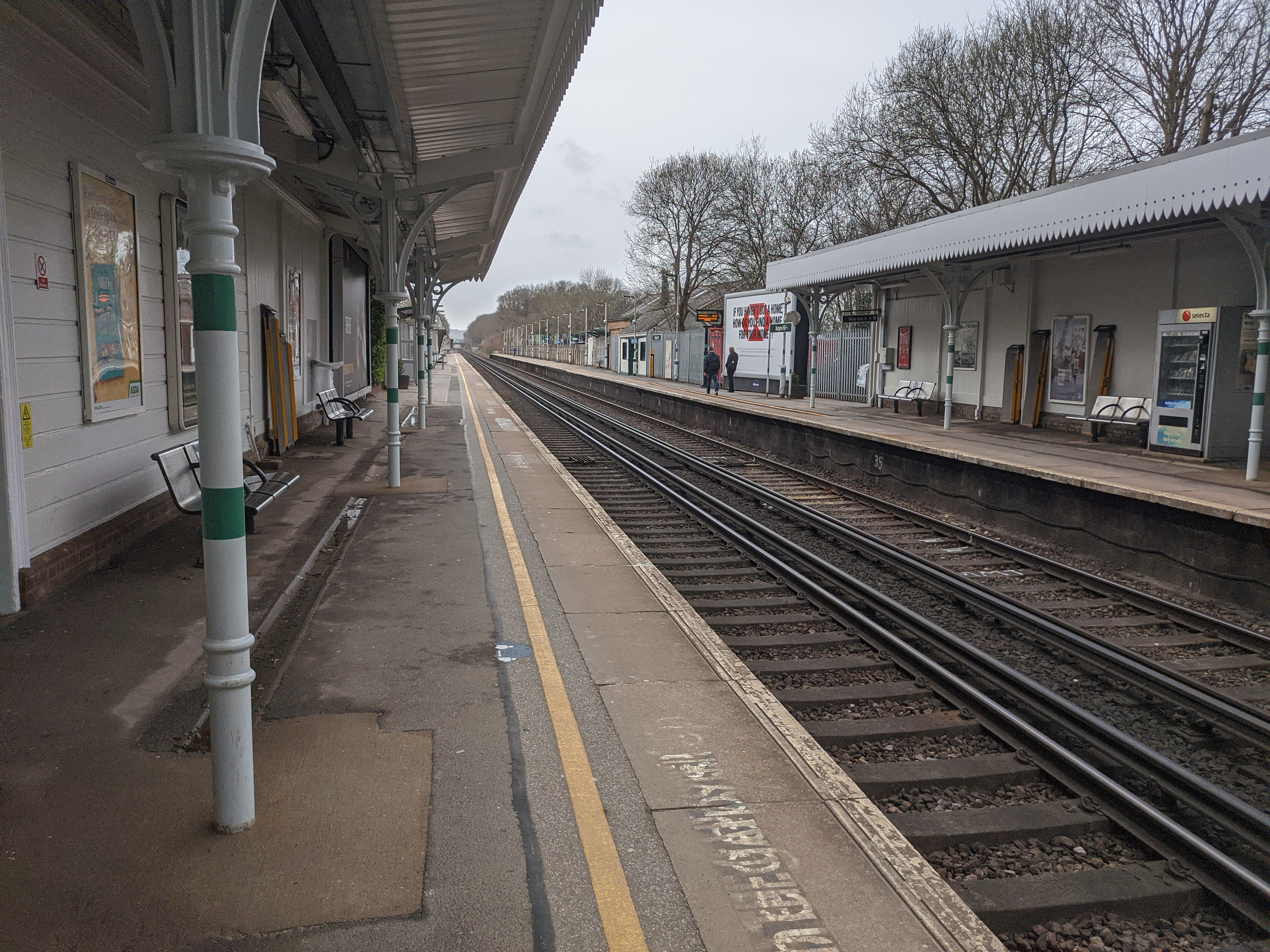
View from platform 2 (southbound) looking towards Hassocks.

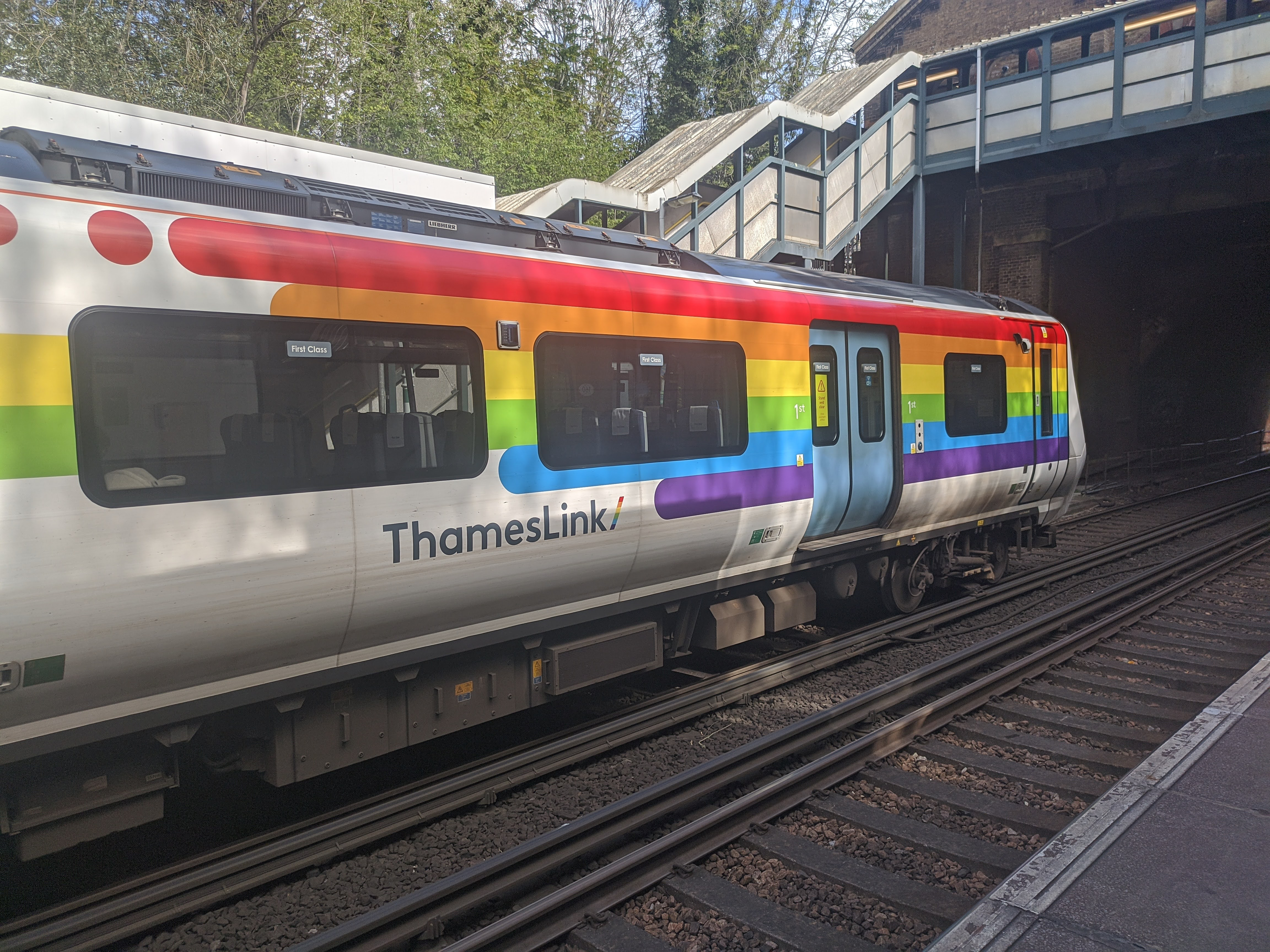
Thameslink Class 700155 with a rainbow livery to celebrate gay pride.

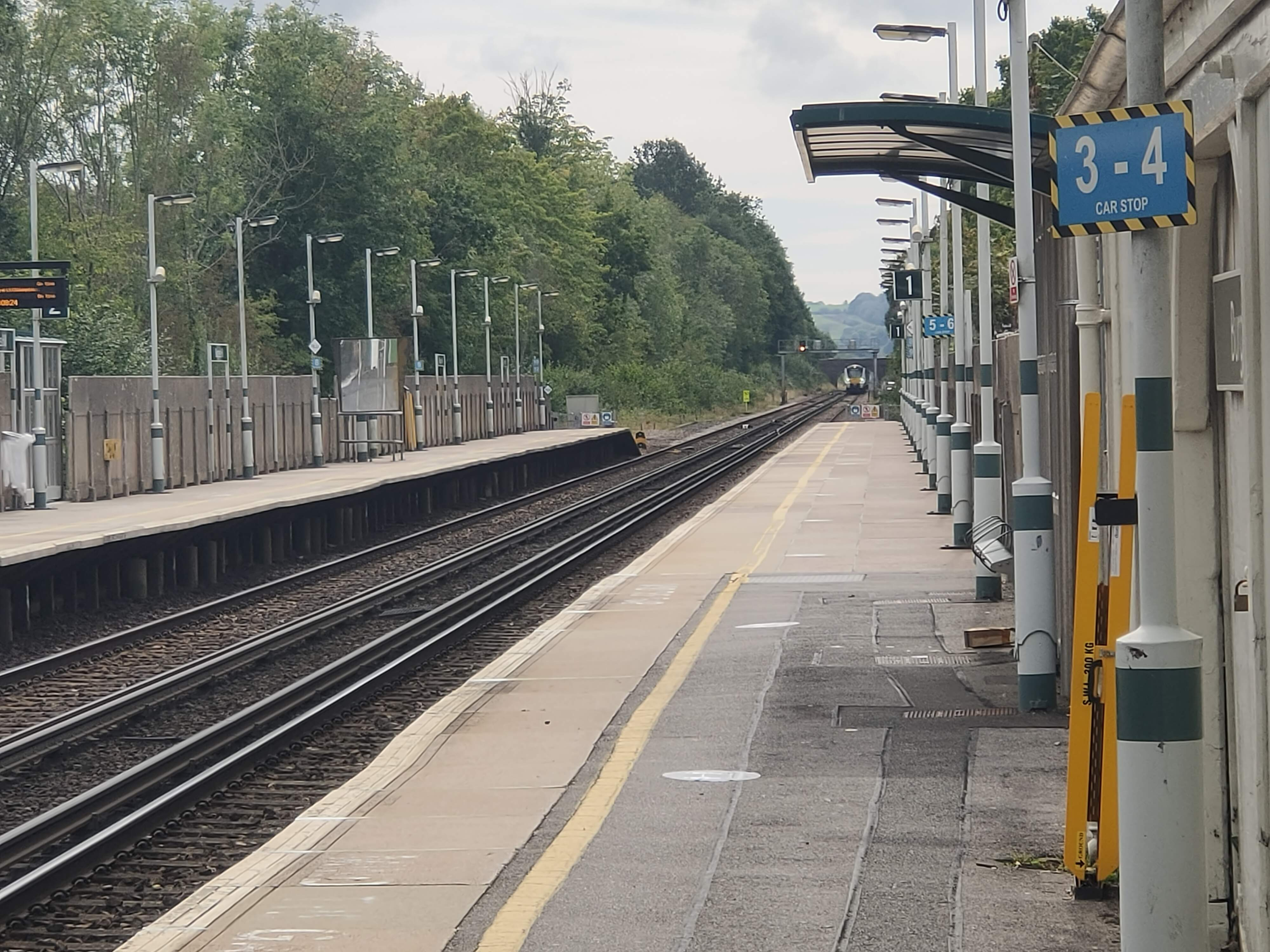
Southward view from Platform 1, with a Thameslink Class 700 approaching from Hassocks.

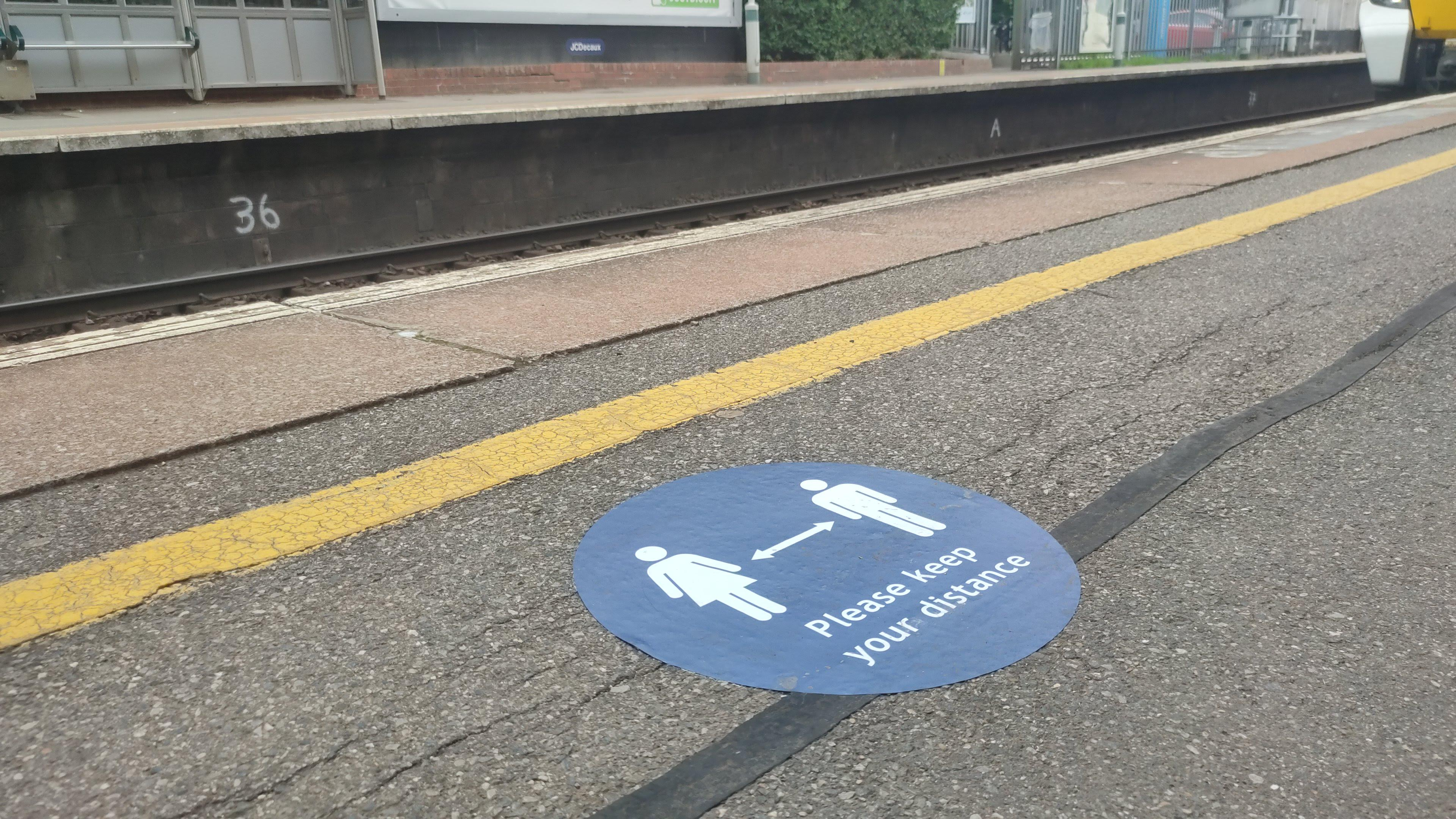
An outdoor vinyl sticker promoting social distancing on platform 1.

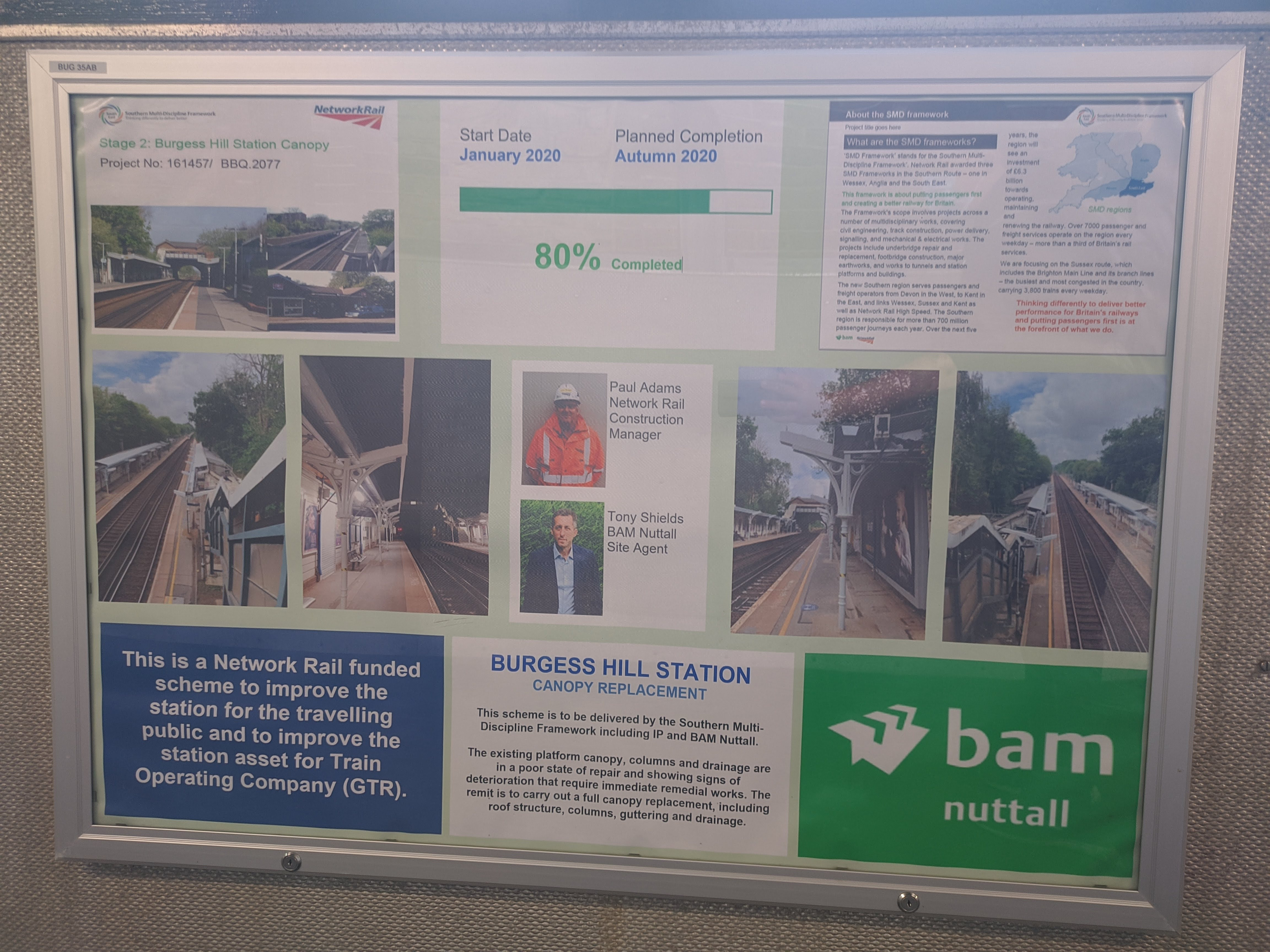
Public noticeboard documenting the station renovations.
