= Brighton Regency Synagogue =

Former synagogue in Brighton, England

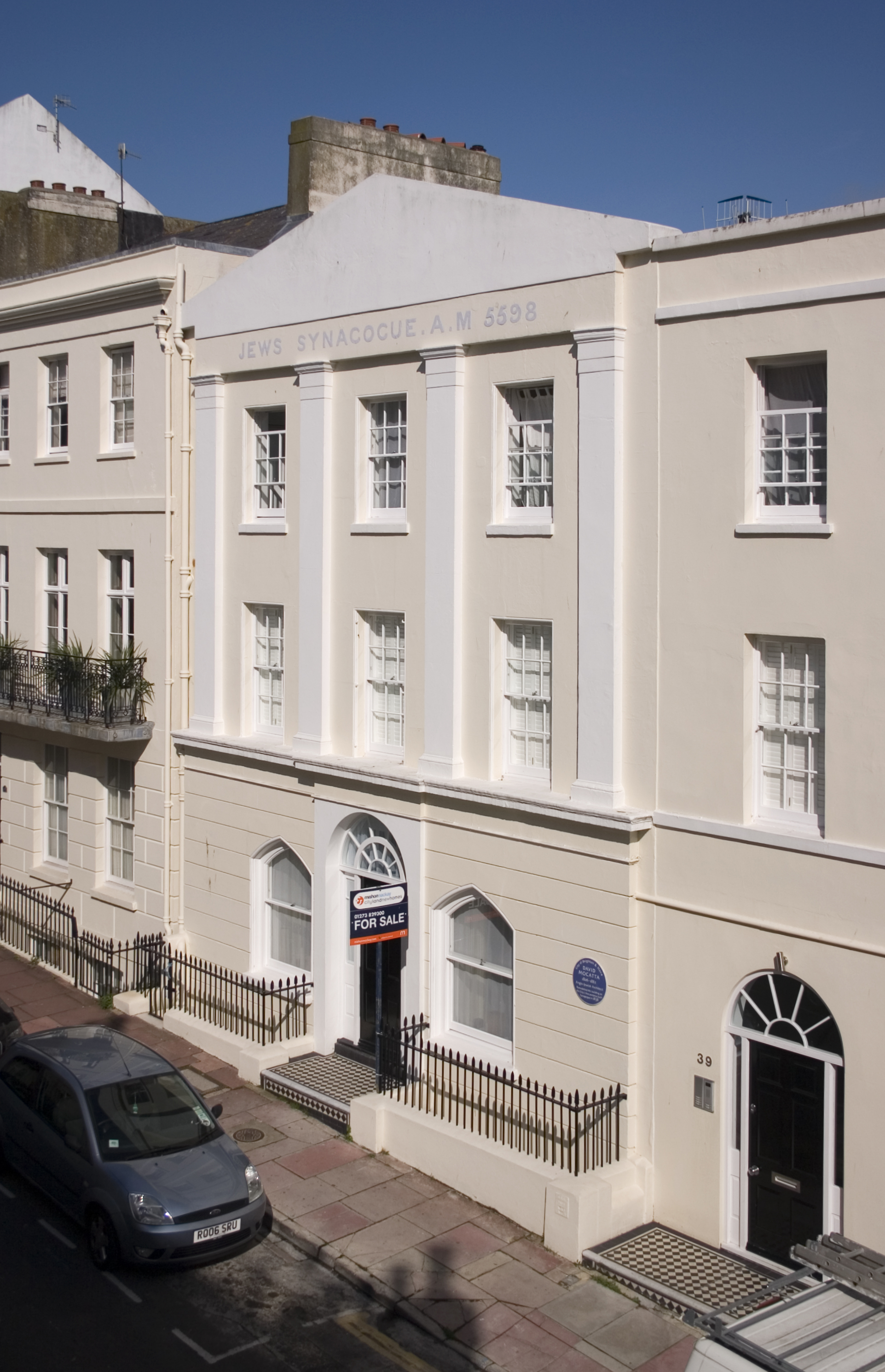
- The former synagogue from the southwest

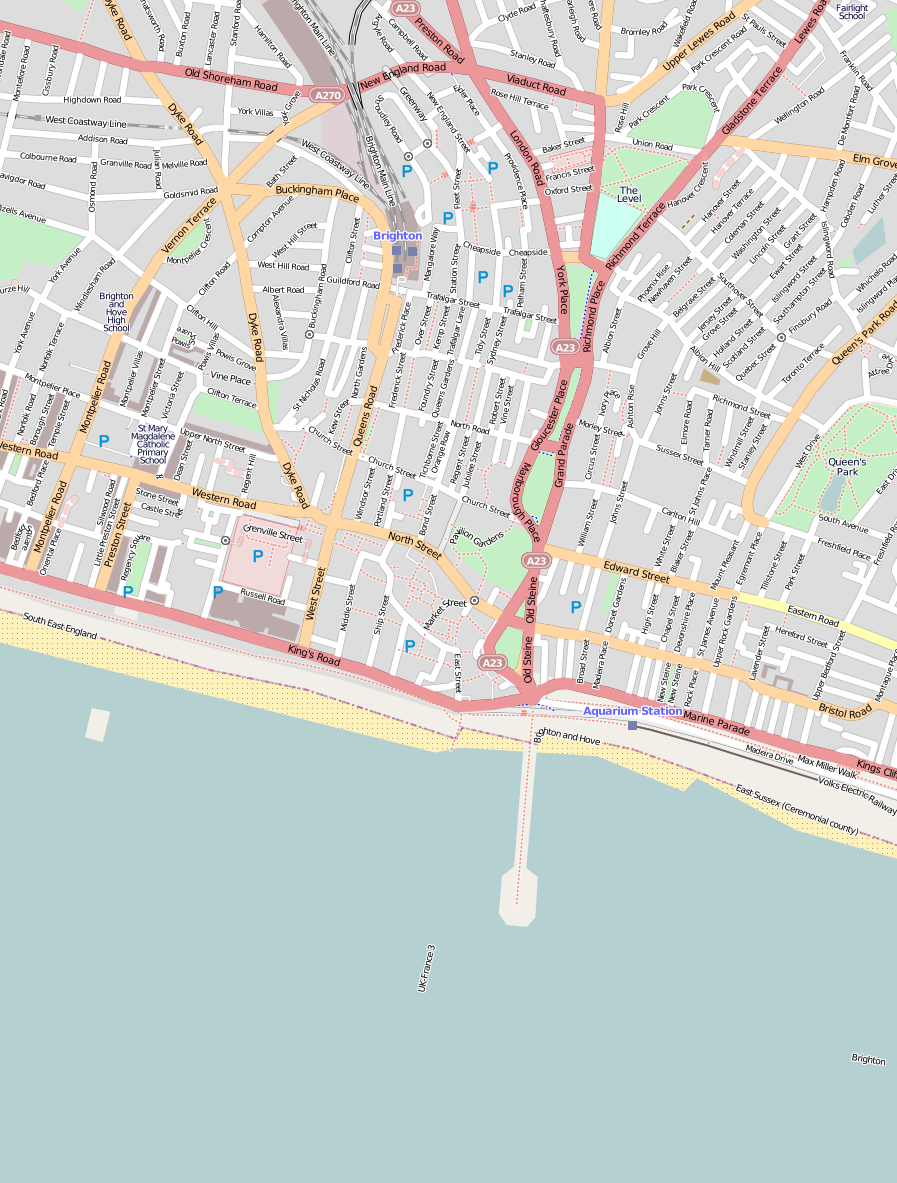
- Location of the former synagogue, now apartment complex, in Brighton and Hove

Religion
- Affiliation: Orthodox Judaism (former)
- Rite: Nusach Ashkenaz
- Ecclesiastical or organizational status: Synagogue (1824–1874); Residential apartments (since 2007)
- Status: Closed (as a synagogue); Repurposed

Location
- Location: 38–39 Devonshire Place, Kemptown, Brighton and Hove, East Sussex, England BN2 1QB
- Country: United Kingdom
- Interactive map of Brighton Regency Synagogue
- Coordinates: 50°49′17″N 0°07′52″W

Architecture
- Architect: David Mocatta
- Type: Synagogue architecture
- Style: Regency
- Established: 1824 (as a congregation)
- Completed: 1825

Listed Building – Grade II
- Official name: Nos. 38 and 39 and attached walls and piers, Devonshire Place (east side)
- Designated: 20 August 1971
- Reference no.: 1380432

The Brighton Regency Synagogue, also called the Devonshire Place Synagogue, is a former Orthodox Jewish congregation and synagogue, located at 38–39 Devonshire Place, Kemptown, Brighton and Hove, in East Sussex, England, in the United Kingdom. The congregation, established in 1824, worshiped in the Ashkenazi rite.

The Regency building was completed in 1825 as a synagogue and ceased operation as a synagogue in 1874. The former synagogue building was listed as a Grade II listed building in 1971.

The site now comprises an apartment building.

== History ==
The synagogue was built in 1824–25. It was enlarged in 1836–38 to designs by David Mocatta, England's first Jewish architect.

The building's chaste, pilastered façade, symmetry, and central doorway are typical of the Regency style. A faded inscription reading jews synagogue 5598 (1838) was faintly visible under the pediment in 2006. Inside, the original ceiling lantern, a typical Regency feature, is still in place.

The building was replaced by the Middle Street Synagogue in 1875, and sold. By 2007 it had been converted into apartments, with the façade sensitively restored and an historic plaque mentioning the architect.

== See also ==
- Grade II listed buildings in Brighton and Hove: A–B
- History of the Jews in England
- List of former synagogues in the United Kingdom
- List of places of worship in Brighton and Hove
