= Balcombe =

Village and civil parish in West Sussex, England

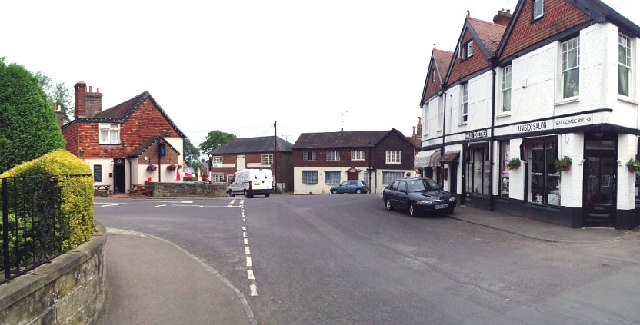
- Balcombe village centre

- Location within West Sussex
- Area: 21.05 km^{2} (8.13 sq mi)
- Population: 1,765 2001 Census; 1,917 (2011 Census)
  - Density: 84/km^{2} (220/sq mi)
- OS grid reference: TQ306302
  - London: 31 miles (50 km) N
- Civil parish: Balcombe
- District: Mid Sussex
- Shire county: West Sussex
- Region: South East
- Country: England
- Sovereign state: United Kingdom
- Post town: HAYWARDS HEATH
- Postcode district: RH17
- Dialling code: 01444
- Police: Sussex
- Fire: West Sussex
- Ambulance: South East Coast
- UK Parliament: Horsham
- Website: Balcombe Village

Balcombe is a village and civil parish in the Mid Sussex District of West Sussex, England. It lies 31 miles (50 km) south of London, 16 miles (26 km) north of Brighton, and 32 miles (51 km) east-northeast of the county town of Chichester. Nearby towns include Crawley to the northwest and Haywards Heath to the south-southeast.

== History ==
The name Balcombe may mean "Mining Place Camp". Bal is a Cornish word meaning a mining place as in Bal Maidens, and the same word may have existed in Ancient British Celtic. Although Coombe or Combe can mean a valley, it can also come from the Roman "camp". So possibly from its name Balcombe could have once been a Romano-British mining settlement.

South of Balcombe on the London to Brighton railway line is the Ouse Valley Viaduct. Designed and engineered by John Urpeth Rastrick (1780–1856) in consultation with the talented architect David Mocatta, it was completed in 1842. It is 100 feet (30 m) high and 500 yards long. It has 37 arches and was built with 11 million imported Dutch bricks.

The village has a series of murals about World War I in its Victory Hall. Lady Gertrude Denman commissioned artist Neville Lytton to paint the thirty-four feet (10 m) long by ten feet (3.0 m) high frescoes.

Balcombe was the birthplace of Colour Sergeant (later Lieutenant Colonel) Frank Bourne DCM, who fought at the battle of Rorke's Drift in the Zulu War. He was the last British survivor of that battle when he died in Dorking in 1945. Famous residents included actor Paul Scofield who is buried with his wife Joy in St. Mary's churchyard.

The River Ouse was once navigable from the south coast to Balcombe, for the delivery of Dutch bricks to the viaduct.

== Landmarks ==
=== Listed buildings ===
Balcombe civil parish contains 59 listed buildings. Of these, two are Grade I, four are Grade II* and the remaining 53 buildings are Grade II.

The Grade I listed buildings are:

- The Parish Church of St Mary (List Entry Number 1354797) - see below.
- Stone Hall (List Entry Number 1286412), a late C17 house. It was the dower-house of the Balcombe Place estate.

The Grade II* buildings are:

- Balcombe Place (List Entry Number 1025775), a Tudor-style country House, built in 1856 by Henry Clutton for John Hankey of Naylands.
- Kemp's House (List Entry Number 1192986), a late C17 house.
- Edmund's Farmhouse (List Entry Number 1193049), a C15 timber-framed building, with a C16 wing added behind.
- Ouse Valley Railway Viaduct (List Entry Number 1366101), designed by John Rastrick and David Mocatta; constructed in 1839–41.

=== Scheduled monuments ===
The parish contains no scheduled monuments.

== St Mary's Church ==
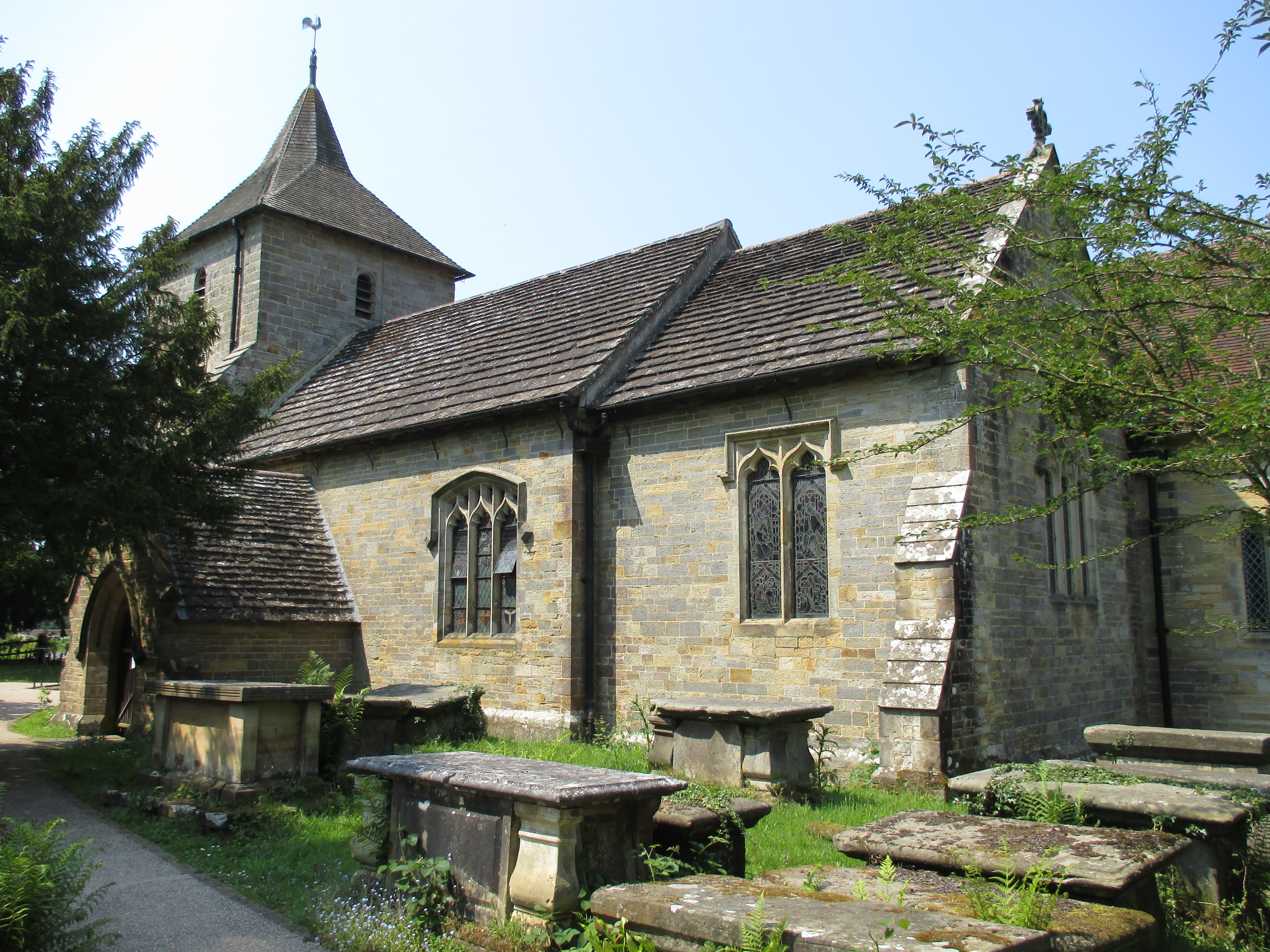
St Mary's Church, Balcombe

St Mary's Church is Balcombe's parish church, located to the north of the village, on London Road (B2036), at 51°03′45.6″N 0°08′10.3″W. The original church was built in the late 13th or early 14th century; it consisted of a chancel (now the south chapel) and a narrow nave (now the south aisle). The west tower, with a shingled broach spire, was added in the 15th century. The church was rebuilt in 1847–50, adding a north aisle (now the nave); and again in 1872–72, when the current north aisle and chancel were built. The church is built of local sandstone, with a Horsham Stone roof. The church is a Grade I listed building, listed for the tower (List Entry Number 1354797, first listed 28 October 1957).

The actor Paul Scofield and his wife Joy are buried in the graveyard.

The church is in the Church of England Diocese of Chichester, Archdeaconry of Horsham.

== Rail transport ==
The village has a railway station which lies just north of Haywards Heath on the Brighton Main Line. Balcombe railway station helped expand a predominantly farming community into one of the popular London commuter villages. The station offers direct services to London Victoria, Cambridge (via London Bridge), and Brighton. To the north of the village is Balcombe tunnel.

== Oil exploration ==
Test drilling and possible fracking for petroleum deposits was proposed in 2012. A protest group was formed and a picnic was held. There was considerable opposition in the local population to exploration plans. Cuadrilla Resources, the company that proposes to drill the well, engaged in public relations efforts attempting to convince villagers that the project was both useful and safe. Previous exploration by Conoco in the same area in 1986 was abandoned.

In July 2013 a licence to drill the well was granted by the Environment Agency and Cuadrilla began transporting equipment and supplies to the test site. The well would be 3,000 feet (910 m) deep with a possible 2,500 feet (760 m) horizontal leg. As of August 2013, Balcombe had emerged as a focus of opposition to fracking in the Weald Basin of southeast England and vigorous protests were in progress.

In March 2014, a group of residents set up a renewable energy co-operative called REPOWERBalcombe, with a view to healing the rifts that emerged during the protests. REPOWERBalcombe aims to match the village's domestic electricity demand with community-owned solar power.

== The Hitchhiker's Guide to the Galaxy (TV series) ==
Balcombe was used as the location for Arthur Dent's house in the first episode of The Hitchhiker's Guide to the Galaxy (TV series) in May 1980. Dent wakes up to find bulldozers about to demolish his house. The show's producers said they spent two months searching for the ideal location, before finding the farmhouse at Edmonds Farm in Balcombe.
