= Ouse Valley Viaduct =

Railway viaduct in Sussex, England, carrying the London–Brighton line

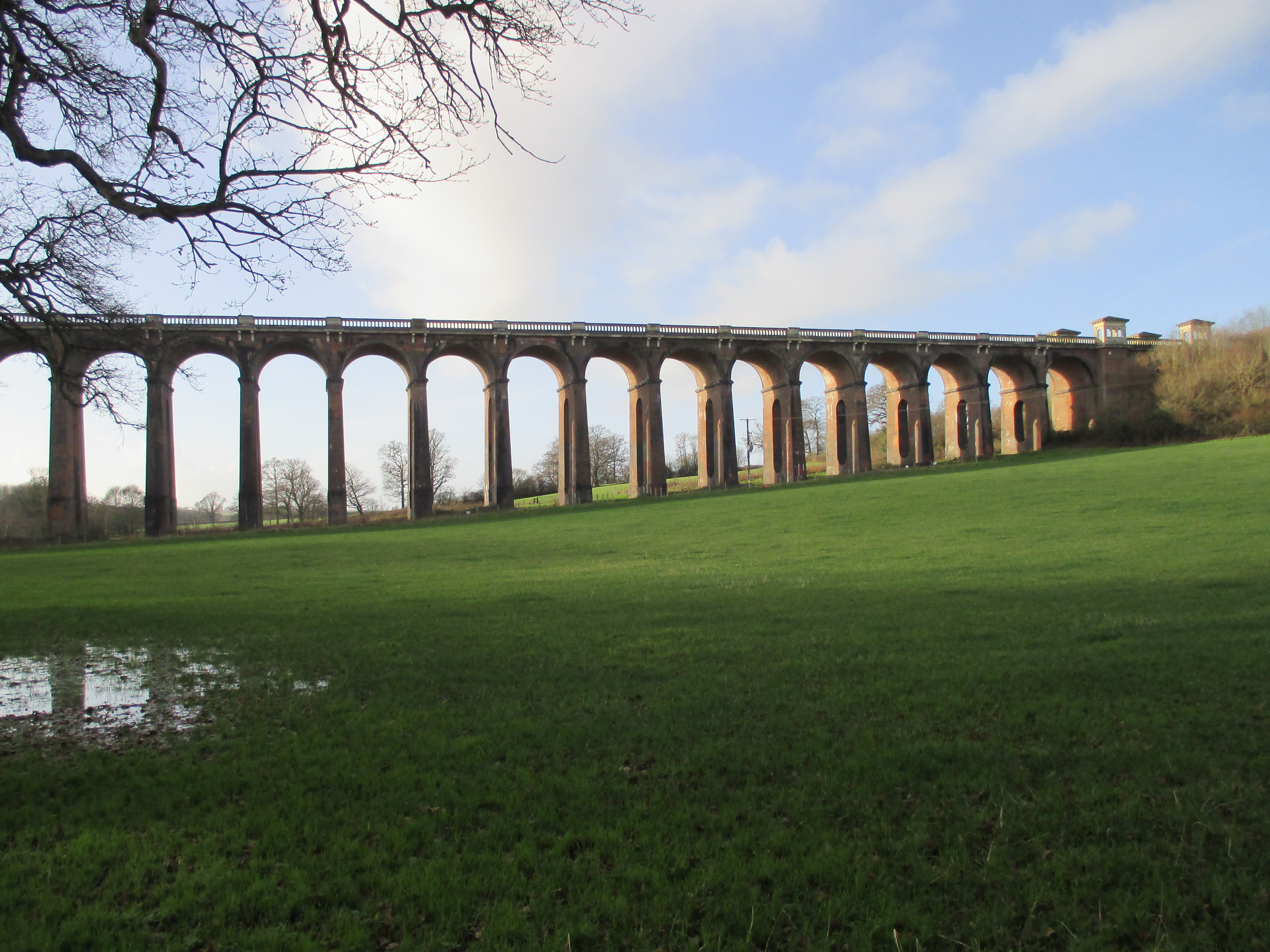
- Northern end of Ouse Valley Viaduct
- Coordinates: 51°02′05″N 0°06′52″W
- Carries: Brighton Main Line
- Crosses: River Ouse, Sussex
- Locale: Between Haywards Heath and Balcombe
- Other name: Balcombe Viaduct
- Maintained by: Network Rail

Characteristics
- Pier construction: Brick
- Total length: 450 m (1,480 ft)
- Width: 13 m (43 ft)
- No. of spans: 37

Rail characteristics
- No. of tracks: 2
- Track gauge: 1,435 mm (4 ft 8 1/2 in)

History
- Designer: John Urpeth Rastrick
- Contracted lead designer: David Mocatta
- Construction end: 1842
- Construction cost: £38,500 (1841)
- Opened: July 1841

Listed Building – Grade II*
- Official name: Ouse Valley Railway Viaduct
- Designated: 11 May 1983
- Reference no.: 1027895

Location
- Interactive map of Ouse Valley Viaduct

The Ouse Valley Viaduct (or the Balcombe Viaduct) carries the Brighton Main Line over the River Ouse in Sussex, England. It is located to the north of Haywards Heath and the south of Balcombe. Known for its ornate design, the structure has been described as "probably the most elegant viaduct in Britain."

Construction of the Ouse Valley Viaduct commenced by the London and Brighton Railway company the beginning of 1839. It was designed by the principal engineer for the line, John Urpeth Rastrick. The architect of the London to Brighton railway, David Mocatta is often associated with the ornate stonework but an 1843 contemporary report on the construction of the viaduct makes no mention of him and neither does a drawing of one of the pavilions in a collection of Rastrick's drawings. The viaduct is 96 feet (29 m) tall and is carried on 37 semi-circular arches, each of 30 feet (9.1 m), surmounted by balustrades, spanning a total length of 1,480 feet (450 m). Each pier contains a jack arch with a semi-circular soffit, which had the benefit of reducing the number of bricks required. On 12 July 1841, the viaduct was officially opened to train services, although the finishing details were not fully completed until the following year.

Despite the structure's fine design, materials, and architectural features, the viaduct has had an expensive and problematic history. The first major restoration work occurred during the 1890s, during which sections of the original brickwork were entirely replaced in the belief that this would increase the structure's strength. However, the viaduct suffered considerable decay during the majority of the twentieth century. By May 1983, the viaduct had been recognised as a Grade II* listed structure. Between March 1996 and September 1999, the viaduct was subject to an extensive restoration by national rail infrastructure owner Railtrack; this work was part-funded by the Railway Heritage Trust, English Heritage and West Sussex County Council.

== Construction ==
In July 1837, an act of Parliament, the London and Brighton Railway Act 1837 (7 Will. 4 & 1 Vict. c. cxix), was passed which gave the London and Brighton Railway company permission to construct its proposed railway line between London and the south coast. The route selected, which was surveyed by a team headed by Sir John Rennie, was fairly direct but had the downside of crossing over some relatively hilly terrain. As a consequence of a decision to limit gradients along the line to 1 in 264, the construction of a total of five tunnels and three viaducts was necessary.

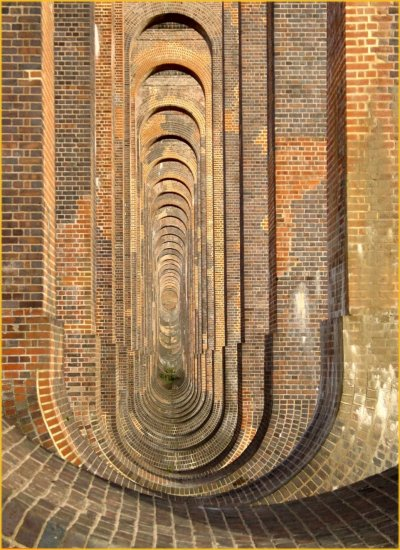
The arched vaulting supporting brick piers

Construction of the new line commenced in July 1838; work to build the ornate viaduct began during the following year. It was designed by the principal engineer for the line, John Urpeth Rastrick and the original contractor appointed for its construction was Benjamin Baylis. The accepted contract tender was £38,500 (equivalent to £3.45 million in 2025).

The viaduct was designed as an elegant structure, being around 1,600 feet (500 m) in length and carrying a straight line over 37 identical arches. Each of these semi-circular arches had a span of 30 feet (9.1 m) and was supported upon tapered red-brick piers. Each pier was almost divided into two separate halves by 9.8-foot (3 m) vertical voids, capped by semi-circular rings at the top and base, as a weight-saving measure. This approach is credited with giving the structure a slender appearance. The foundation of each pier is provided with two courses of inclined footings, which have a total depth of just over 3 feet 3 inches (1 m).

The viaduct is mostly composed of traditional red bricks topped with smooth limestone. The contrast between the two materials effectively highlights the deck and upper elements of the structure, although the limestone has been subjected to considerable weathering and staining since its original installation. The brickwork and the limestone elements have been replaced over time to maintain the structure's integrity, extend its operational life, and restore its appearance to better resemble its original state. At its highest point, the Ouse Valley Viaduct is 96 feet (29.3 m) above the river.

There have been various claims that many of the estimated 11 million bricks used in the construction, were produced as far away as the Netherlands. No primary sources are cited with these claims and they are at odds with the contemporary newspaper reporting and the London and Brighton Railway Company's own meeting minute books held at The National Archives (RAIL 386/1 and RAIL 386/6).

"These Contracts are all let and the Contractors are actively engaged in casting up Brick Earth, preparing materials, and getting them to the ground to commence the work immediately as the weather permits"

— Meeting of the Proprietors of the London and Brighton Railway, 16 January 1839 (RAIL 386/1)

"Contract No 10 the Ouse Viaduct is in a very progressive state – the Contractor (Baylis) has already got 10 Foundations for the Piers of the Arches laid, & his arrangements display a considerable degree of experience & confidence as to its completion at a period sufficiently early with regard to its stability & preparations are afoot for making Six Millions of Bricks this summer"

— Meeting of the Directors of the London and Brighton Railway, 6 June 1839 (RAIL 386/6)

The core construction was complete at the beginning of December 1840, the Brighton Gazette reporting:

"On Thursday the last arch of the Ouse Viaduct on the London to Brighton Railway was keyed by Mr Maude, the resident engineer of the centre district of the railway, in the presence of the parties engaged on the work, together with a considerable number of visitors from Brighton and Lewes".

— The Brighton Gazette, 12 December 1840

The original contract of works dated 21 January 1839 (East Sussex Records Office ACC 8894/3/1) specified the stone work to have come from UK quarries but this changed to Caen stone from Normandy in France. This material was used for the classically balustraded parapets, string courses, pier caps and the four small rectangular Italianate pavilions.

There appear to have been delays in sourcing this and other materials as a minute in the Meetings of Directors 1838–1844 (RAIL 386/6) notes on 15 July 1841 that:

"The whole length of the Viaduct is 480 yards and the width between the parapets is 28 feet. The Brickwork is completed, and almost all the centres are struck, but the parapet which is to be very handsome, and of stone from Caen in Normandy is yet in a very backward state and cannot be finished for some weeks".

Rastrick created a moving scaffold for the masons to continue the work with a single line in use. A report in the Brighton Gazette on 12 August 1841 noted that both lines were then in operation.

== Opening ==
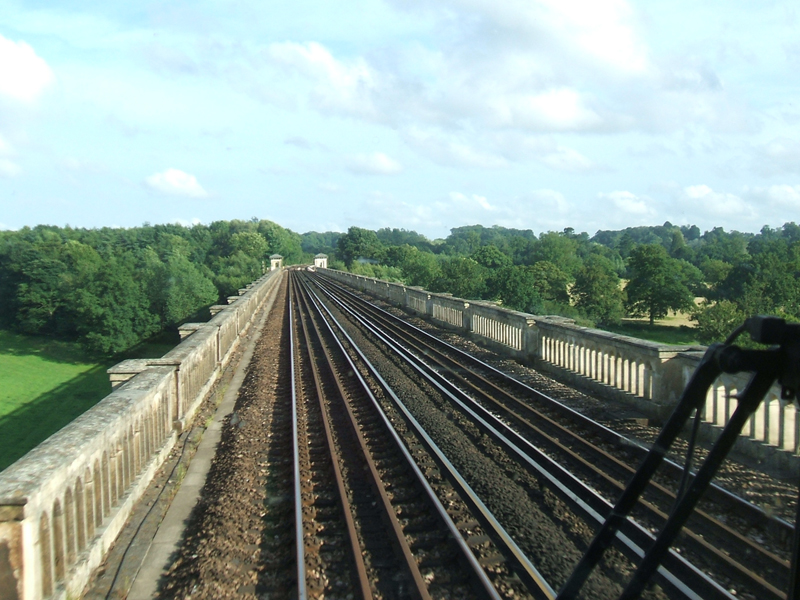
Southbound view from on top of the Ouse Valley Viaduct, 2009

The Brighton Main Line was opened in two sections because completion was delayed by the need to complete major earthworks, in particular the tunnel at Haywards Heath. The viaduct was officially opened when the section between Norwood Junction and Haywards Heath was opened on 12 July 1841.

By 1846 the viaduct had become part of the London, Brighton and South Coast Railway. In 1923 as a result of the Railways Act 1921, it became part of the Southern Railway network. It remained under Southern's ownership until January 1948, when the nationalisation of the Big Four railway companies formed the publicly owned railway operator British Railways.

== Maintenance and restoration ==
The first major restoration work occurred during the 1890s, and was focused on repairs to the brickwork. Engineers of the late Victorian era were concerned that the original lime mortar used in the viaduct's construction was inadequate and the decision was made to replace it with cement mortar. However, the replacement facing brickwork and substandard mortar eventually caused its own failures prompting more expensive repairs later on. This was likely due to the repair work having borne a greater share of the structure's load than intended, resulting in an accelerated failure rate. Poorly bonded header bricks are another probable culprit for its ineffectiveness. Additionally, the parapets and pavilions, although made from Caen stone (a high-quality limestone), have been subjected to heavy weathering.

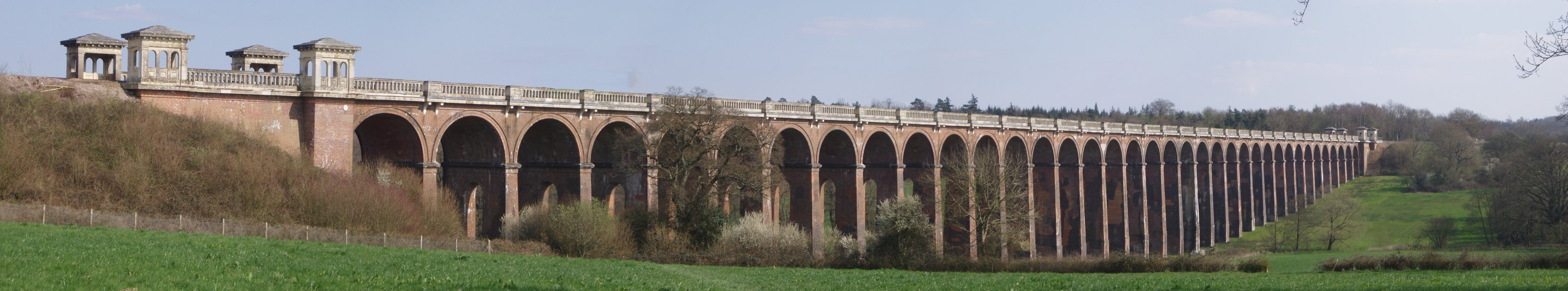
The Ouse Valley Viaduct in 2007, with the four decorative pavilions visible at each end

By 1956 the damage to the viaduct was extensive but the cost of refurbishment work was deemed too high by British Rail. By May 1983, the viaduct had been officially recognised as a Grade II* listed structure.

By the 1980s, the eight pavilions present on the viaduct were in such a poor condition that some of their roofs had fallen in and the installation of internal props was required to halt their further collapse. As a consequence of its heritage status, all envisioned alterations to the viaduct need to be reviewed and agreed upon by English Heritage. When British Rail proposed to dismantle the original pavilions and rebuild them using reconstituted stonework, English Heritage refused permissions; accordingly, there was no substantial restoration performed to the viaduct during this period, a decision which British Rail publicly attributed to the sizeable estimated cost of such works. The fabric of the structure continued to deteriorate over the next decade, with sections of stonework falling away from the balustrades and parapets.

Starting in March 1996, the viaduct underwent a £6.5 million renovation overseen by the national rail infrastructure company Railtrack and partially funded by grants from West Sussex County Council, Railway Heritage Trust and English Heritage. Harder-wearing limestone was imported from Bordeaux to ensure the closest match with the existing Caen stone in the balustrades and pavilions. Some of the piers had to be reconstructed because of failures in the Victorian brickwork. The new bricks were handmade in a variety of sizes to suit the existing brickwork and set in sand, cement, and lime mortar; stainless steel anchoring was used to firmly fix the new stone to the old stonework. Throughout the work, one of the lines always remained open while restoration activity was being carried out on the other side of the viaduct. The project, which took more than three years, was completed in September 1999.

In 2010 it was noted that the degradation was partially a consequence of the structure's long lifespan: when originally constructed in the 1840s, its intended design life was only 120 years. From 2023, repairs were being undertaken by Network Rail with various companies. As of September 2024 it was unclear when they would finish.

== Media appearances ==
The bridge on the cover art of Lovejoy's EP, Wake Up & It's Over was based on the Ouse Valley Viaduct.

== See also ==
- Grade II* listed buildings in West Sussex
