= World's End, West Sussex =

Neighbourhood of Burgess Hill, West Sussex, England

Coordinates: 50.9647°N 0.1193°W

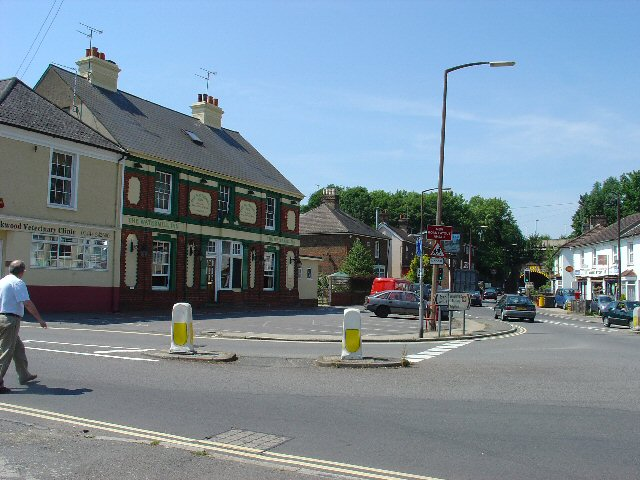
The Watermill Inn

World's End is a neighbourhood of Burgess Hill, West Sussex, England. It is thought that the name arrived with the railway in the 19th century – it was here that the 'up' line met the 'down' line during construction of the Brighton Main Line.

== Present day ==
Wivelsfield railway station, one of two in Burgess Hill, is here.

World's End has a primary school (Oak Tree) and a recreation ground. World's End is sometimes known incorrectly as Wivelsfield, the confusion being caused by the name of the station. Wivelsfield is a separate village a few miles to the east of World's End.
