= Haywards Heath railway station =

Railway station in West Sussex, England

Coordinates: 51.005°N 0.105°W

Haywards Heath
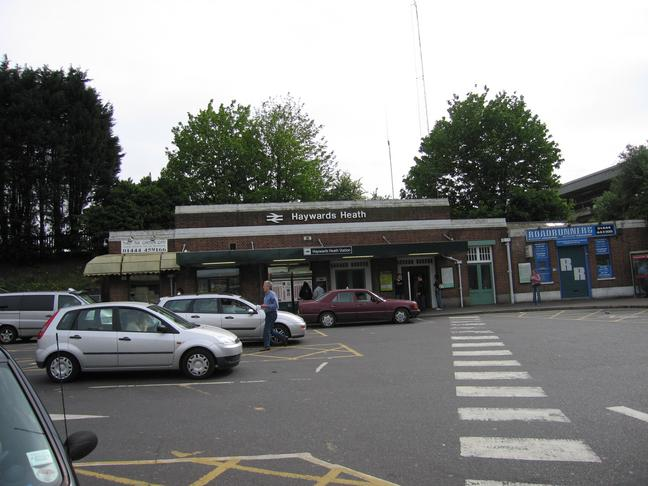

General information
- Location: Haywards Heath, District of Mid Sussex; England
- Grid reference: TQ330245
- Managed by: Southern
- Platforms: 4

Other information
- Station code: HHE
- Classification: DfT category B

Key dates
- 12 July 1841: Opened (terminus)
- 21 September 1841: Opened (through)
- 1883: Ardingly branch opened
- 1933: Electrification and Rebuilt
- 28 October 1963: Ardingly branch closed

Passengers
- 2020/21: ▼0.955 million
- Interchange: ▼0.102 million
- 2021/22: ▲2.575 million
- Interchange: ▲0.270 million
- 2022/23: ▲3.395 million
- Interchange: ▲0.325 million
- 2023/24: ▲3.696 million
- Interchange: ▲0.346 million
- 2024/25: ▲3.958 million
- Interchange: ▲0.384 million
Location
Notes
- Passenger statistics from the Office of Rail and Road

Haywards Heath railway station is on the Brighton Main Line in England, serving the town of Haywards Heath, West Sussex. It is 37 miles 59 chains (60.7 km) down the line from London Bridge via Redhill and is situated between Balcombe and Wivelsfield. It is managed by Southern.

Trains calling at Haywards Heath are operated by Southern, Thameslink and Gatwick Express. Until 2008 a small number of CrossCountry services also stopped here.

== History ==
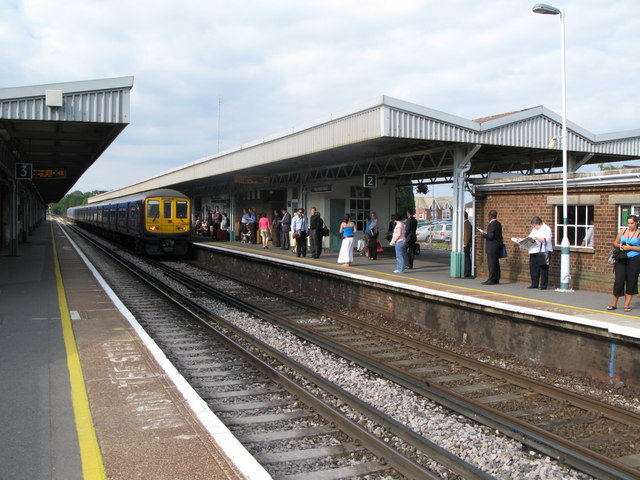
Northbound view of platform 2 in 2008

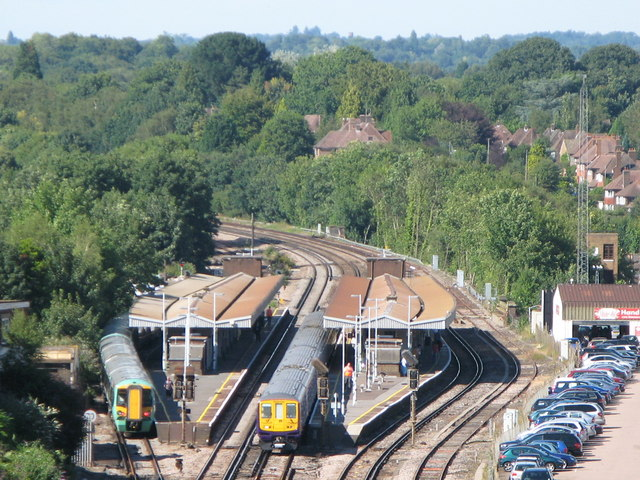
Northbound view of the station in 2008

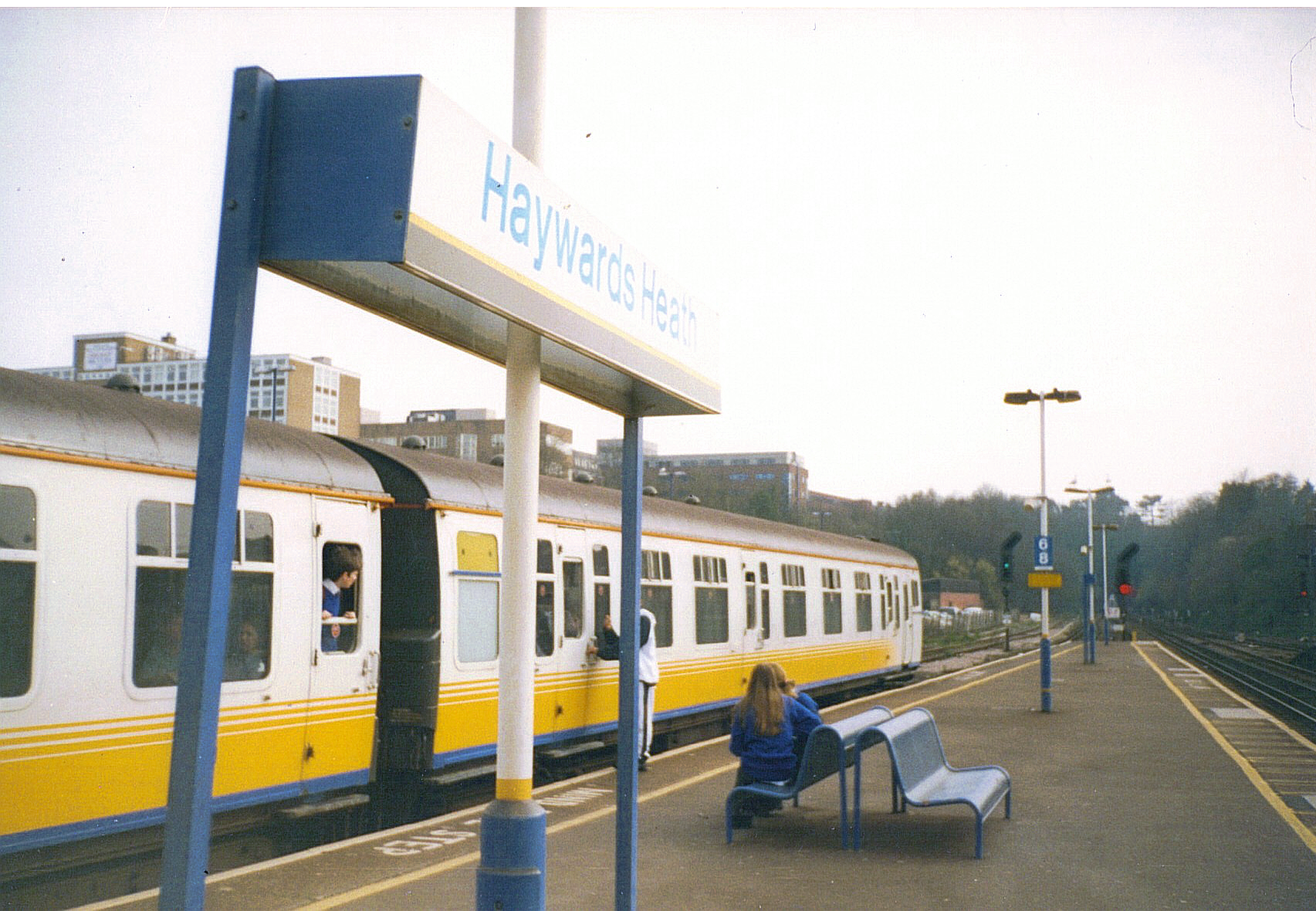
A former Connex South Central train at Haywards Heath station in 2002

The London and Brighton Railway opened its main line from a junction with the London and Croydon Railway at Norwood as far as Haywards Heath on 12 July 1841, with a coach service to take passengers on the remainder of their journey towards Brighton. This was the result of a roof fall during the construction of Haywards Heath Tunnel just south of the station on 2 January 1841, which killed three men. The remainder of the line to Brighton opened shortly after on 21 September of the same year.

The original station was designed by the architect David Mocatta and included a central passing line, and an awning over the platform. The station retained its importance as a junction following the construction of the line to Lewes from Keymer 3 miles (4.8 km) to the south. From 1846 the railway became the London Brighton and South Coast Railway.

On 3 September 1883 the Lewes and East Grinstead Railway opened a branch line from Copyhold Junction, just north of the station, to Horsted Keynes railway station on their existing line between those towns. There was an intermediate station at Ardingly. As a result, Haywards Heath station was enlarged by the provision of two bay platforms. As soon as the line was opened, the Lewes and East Grinstead Railway merged with the London Brighton and South Coast Railway, but until 1912, there was no physical connection between the tracks of the branch line and those of the main line; they ran parallel all the way to Haywards Heath station. Once the connection was made, it provided a relief route for the congested Brighton Main Line from Croydon to Brighton via Oxted, East Grinstead and Haywards Heath. This double-track branch line was closed to passengers on 28 October 1963, but a single-track section remains to serve a freight and aggregates terminal at Ardingly.

Haywards Heath station was the site of the first use of the practice of "slipping" coaches from the rear of express trains, at intermediate junctions, for onward transmission to smaller stations. The earliest recorded example was in February 1858, when coaches for Hastings were slipped from a London Bridge to Brighton express. This practice was a regular feature at the station until the electrification of the line during 1932/3. The station and surrounding structures such as bridges were also totally rebuilt at this time. A single signal box, alongside platform 4 (the westernmost platform face), replaced the former north and south boxes.

In 2014, work began on a new "Station Quarter", which would include construction of a new multi-storey car park and footbridge to service the platforms, a new Waitrose supermarket on site and a regeneration of the existing station buildings. The multi-storey car park was opened in late 2016 along with the new footbridge, while the new Waitrose supermarket was opened in March 2017.

In 2021, a tactile map was installed, in collaboration with the Royal National Institute of Blind People, to help blind and partially sighted passengers navigate the station.

== Layout ==
The station lies on a quadruple-track (Note: There is also a fifth track through the station, but it is unelectrified and rarely used; it is located next to platform 1.) passing loop (the line either side of the station is double-track), which allows fast services to overtake stopping services. As such, it has a total of four platforms, one per track, numbered 1 to 4.

- Platforms 1 and 2 are used for southbound services to destinations such as Brighton, Littlehampton, Eastbourne and Hastings. Non-stop services usually pass through platform 2.
- Platforms 3 and 4 are used for northbound services towards London and beyond. Non-stop services usually pass through platform 3.

Unusually, the platforms have been numbered "right-to-left" (when facing London), instead of "left-to-right" which is the usual numbering scheme on the Brighton Main Line.

Platforms 1 and 4 are signalled bidirectionally, which allows trains to reverse here or run "the wrong way" through the station at times of disruption. Platforms 2 and 3 are partially signalled in both directions, allowing trains running to/from the south to reverse here.

A short distance north of the station lies a single-track unelectrified freight-only line, which runs to an aggregates terminal at Ardingly; this branch can only be accessed via platform 1.

=== Access ===
There are three entrances/exits at the station. The main one is just off Commercial Square; access to platforms is in the form of a subway under the railway line. The other two entrances and exits use the new footbridge on the southern end of the platforms; one end of the footbridge leads onto Market Place and the other end connects with the station car park at Clair Road. All routes in and out of the station offer step-free access via lifts from footbridge or ground level to the platforms.

== Services ==
Services at Haywards Heath are operated by Southern, Thameslink and Gatwick Express using Class 377, 387 and 700 EMUs.

The typical off-peak service in trains per hour is:

- 2 tph to Bedford via London Bridge
- 2 tph to Cambridge via London Bridge
- 6 tph to London Victoria (4 of these are branded as Southern and 2 as Gatwick Express)
- 6 tph to Brighton (2 of these run non-stop, 2 call at Burgess Hill only and 2 call at all stations)
- 2 tph to Eastbourne of which 1 continues to Ore via Hastings
- 2 tph to Littlehampton via Worthing

During the peak hours, the station is served by one Southern train per day in each direction between London Bridge and Littlehampton.

During the evenings and on Sundays, the service between Brighton and Cambridge is reduced to hourly. In addition, the Gatwick Express services do not run on Sundays and the station is instead served by a half-hourly Southern service between London Victoria and Brighton.

Preceding station	National Rail	Following station
Balcombe or Three Bridges	Thameslink Brighton Main Line	Wivelsfield or Burgess Hill
Gatwick Airport	Southern West Coastway Line	Burgess Hill
Gatwick Airport	Southern East Coastway Line	Wivelsfield
Gatwick Airport	Gatwick Express Gatwick Express	Brighton
Gatwick Airport	Gatwick Express Gatwick Express	Burgess Hill Peak Hours Only
	Disused railways	
Ardingly Line and station closed	London, Brighton and South Coast Railway Lewes and East Grinstead Railway	Terminus

== Freight sidings ==
The freight sidings at Haywards Heath were constructed during the First World War when the railway received a rapid growth in its freight traffic as a result of munitions trains travelling to Newhaven. They were intended to enable passenger trains to overtake slower freight traffic.

Today a sidings track does remain from Old Wickham Lane Bridge, 700 meters north of the station to Folly Hill Tunnel entrance. This line is not often used anymore; however, it is protected for future extension to the Bluebell Railway. An area imminently east of platform 1 is also protected for the potential terminus platform / station for the Bluebell if it does reach Haywards Heath. The new terminus would have a maximum of 1 platform, but would not be numbered platform 0.
