= David Mocatta =

- Born: David Alfred Mocatta; 17 February 1806; Princes Gate, London
- Died: 1 May 1882 (aged 76); South Kensington, London
- Occupation: Architect
- Buildings: Montefiore Synagogue, Brighton Regency Synagogue
- Projects: Stations for the London and Brighton Railway

David Alfred Mocatta (17 February 1806 – 1 May 1882) was a British architect and a member of the Anglo-Jewish Mocatta family.

== Early career ==
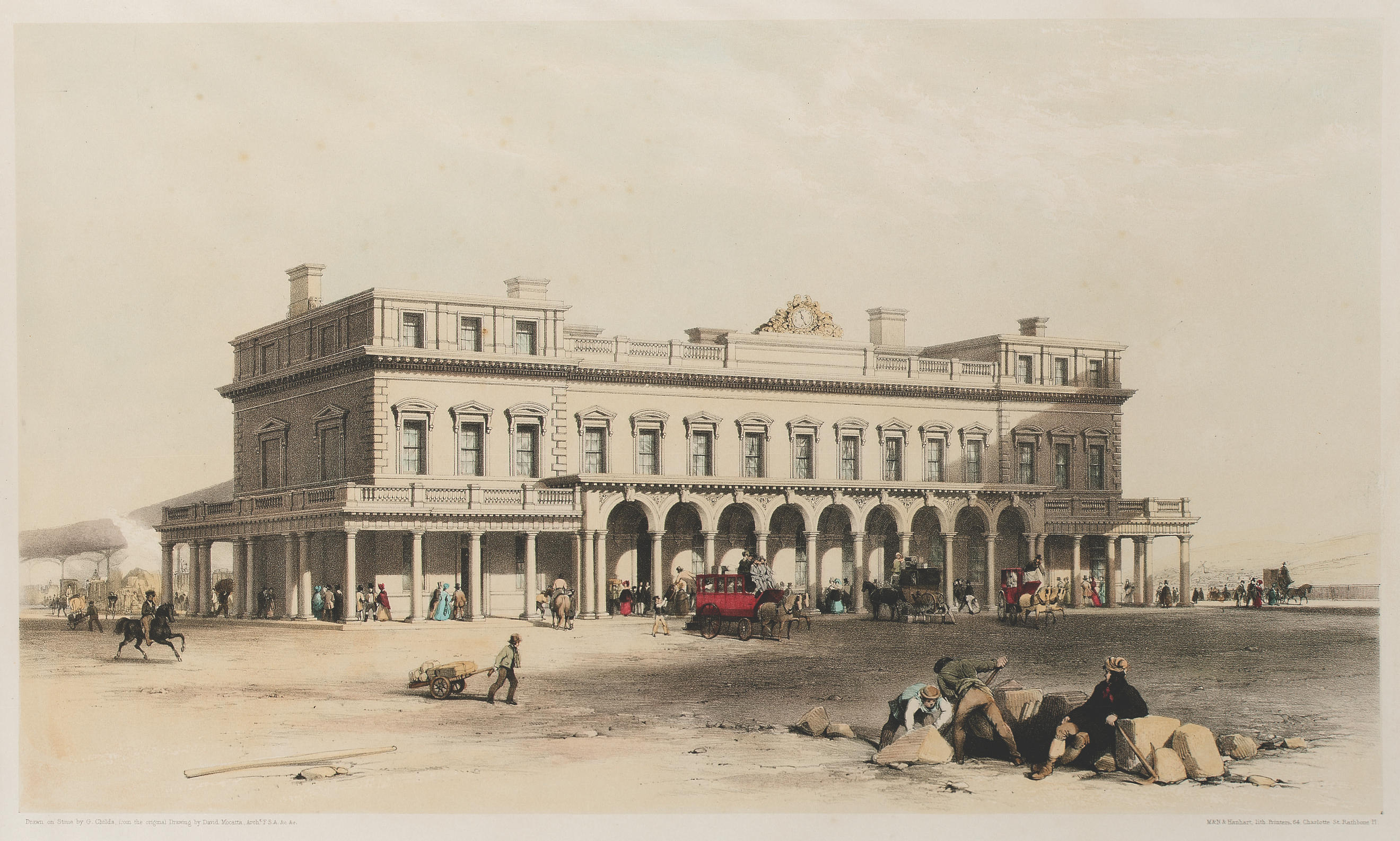
Mocatta's station at Brighton (1841)

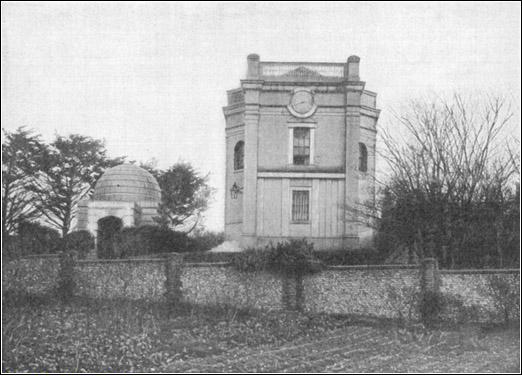
Synagogue and tomb of Moses Montefiore in Ramsgate

David Alfred Mocatta was born to a Sephardic Jewish family, on 17 February 1806, the son of the licensed bullion broker Moses Mocatta (1768–1857) and Abigail Lindo (1775–1824). He also was a grandson of the prominent financier Abraham Lumbroso de Matos Mocatta (1730–1800). He studied in London from 1821 to 1827 under Sir John Soane and then travelled in Italy during 1829–30. By 1839 he was in practice together with W.J. Mocatta at 32 Brunswick Square in Bloomsbury where he remained until 1846, before moving to 57 Old Broad Street in the City of London. His synagogue in Ramsgate for Moses Montefiore (1833) was possibly the first in England to be designed by a Jewish architect. The West London Synagogue of British Jews commissioned Mocatta to design both their temporary premises in Burton Street (1841) and their building in Margaret Street (1851). The latter was a substantial structure, seating 400 and costing more than £4,000. He was elected a Fellow of the Institute of British Architects (later the RIBA) in 1836, and was an early member of its council.

== Railway architecture ==
Mocatta was appointed architect of the London and Brighton Railway, designing the company's headquarters at Brighton railway station, and Haywards Heath, Three Bridges and Hassocks stations, the Balcombe Viaduct and the Mocatta building at Brighton station. Brighton Station was said to have many similarities to the Nine Elms railway station of the London and Southampton Railway (1838) designed by Sir William Tite. The intermediate stations were notable as they were constructed according to a standard plan and layout usually in the Italianate style. Mocatta also designed balustrades and a set of eight Italianate pavilions to ornament John Urpeth Rastrick's Ouse Valley Viaduct for the L&BR.

Mocatta was also involved with Charles Pearson's scheme for a Central London Railway station in Farringdon Street and drew up plans c. 1845, but were never implemented.

== Later career ==
Mocatta provided the winning entry for a competition to design the London Fever Hospital in 1848. He also drew up designs for Stowlangtoft Hall in Suffolk, c. 1846, and the present building (built 1859) was possibly built from his designs. He retired from architecture early, during the 1850s having inherited the family fortunes.

In later years he became Senior Trustee of the Soane Museum. He was a founder member of the West London Synagogue, eventually becoming chairman of its council. Mocatta House, a modern office development in Trafalgar Place, Brighton is named after him.

== Works ==
- Montefiore Synagogue, Ramsgate, Kent, 1833
- Brighton Regency Synagogue, Sussex, 1836–38
- Brighton railway station, Sussex, 1840
- Croydon railway station, Surrey, 1841 (rebuilt 1894–95)
- Red Hill and Reigate Road railway station, Surrey, 1841 (closed 1844)
- Horley railway station, Surrey (1841, enlarged 1862, demolished 1960's)
- Three Bridges railway station, Sussex, 1841 (enlarged 1855 and 1906–09)
- Haywards Heath railway station, Sussex, 1841, (rebuilt 1933)
- Hassocks or Ditchling Gate railway station, Sussex, 1841, (demolished 1880)
- Pavilions & balustrade on the Ouse Valley Viaduct, Sussex, 1841–42
- Clayton Tunnel with the impressive towers of the north portal, Sussex. Completed in 1841 after 3 years. The (off-centre) cottage is a later addition.

== Sources and further reading ==
- Brodie, Antonia (2001). Directory of British Architects 1834-1914, L-Z. London & New York: Continuum. pp. 194. ISBN 0-8264-5514-X.
- Cole, David (1958). "Mocatta's stations for the Brighton Railway". Journal of Transport History. 5 (3). Manchester: Manchester University Press: 149–157. doi:10.1177/002252665800300304. ISSN 0022-5266. S2CID 115346320.
- Colvin, H.M. (1997). A Biographical Dictionary of British Architects, 1600-1840. New Haven: Yale University Press. ISBN 0-300-07207-4.
- Kadish, Sharman (2002). "Construction Identity; Anglo Jewry and Synagogue Architecture". Architectural History. 45: 386–408. doi:10.2307/1568790. JSTOR 1568790.
