= Wivelsfield railway station =

Railway station in West Sussex, England

Coordinates: 50°57′50″N 0°07′15″W

Wivelsfield
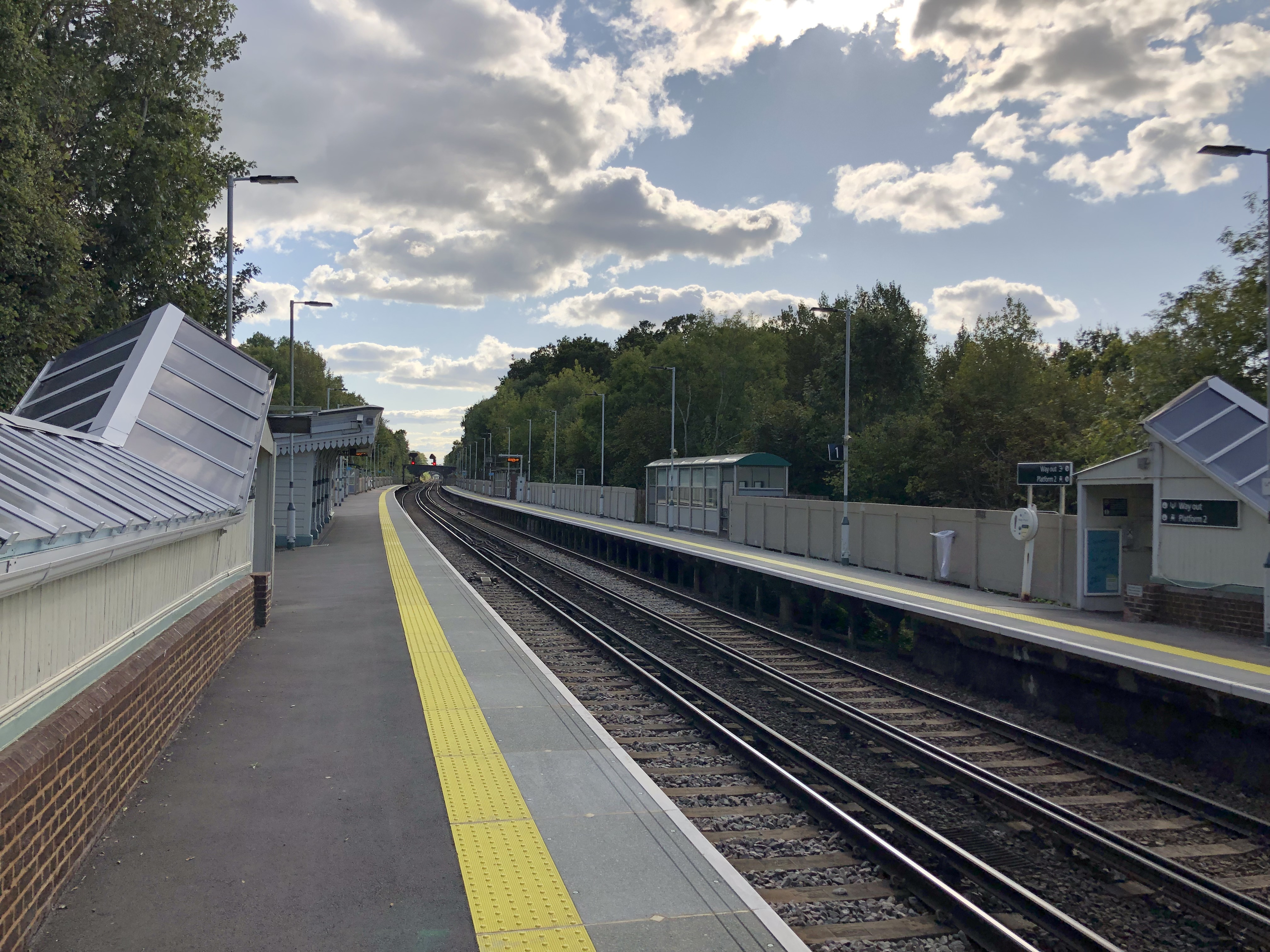
- The platforms at Wivelsfield station, looking south

General information
- Location: World's End, Burgess Hill, District of Mid Sussex; England
- Grid reference: TQ320200
- Managed by: Southern
- Platforms: 2

Other information
- Station code: WVF
- Classification: DfT category E

Key dates
- 1854: First station opened at Keymer Junction
- 1 August 1886: Present station opened
- 1 July 1896: Renamed (Wivelsfield)

Passengers
- 2020/21: ▼0.133 million
- Interchange: ▼6,278
- 2021/22: ▲0.339 million
- Interchange: ▲12,477
- 2022/23: ▲0.394 million
- Interchange: ▲17,532
- 2023/24: ▲0.415 million
- Interchange: ▲20,552
- 2024/25: ▲0.467 million
- Interchange: ▲23,506
Location
Notes
- Passenger statistics from the Office of Rail and Road

Wivelsfield railway station is a railway station on the Brighton Main Line in West Sussex, England. Located in northern Burgess Hill, it primarily serves the town's neighbourhoods of World's End and Sheddingdean. The station is 40 miles 52 chains (65.4 km) down the line from London Bridge via Redhill. It is situated between Haywards Heath and Burgess Hill stations on the main line, and between Haywards Heath and Plumpton stations on the East Coastway line, which branches off just south of the station at Keymer Junction. The station is managed by Southern which is one of two companies serving Wivelsfield, the other one being Thameslink. Until May 2018, Gatwick Express also served the station with a single early-morning service each weekday towards London.

Despite its name, the station is not located in Wivelsfield village, which actually lies approximately 2.3 miles (3.7 km) to the northeast, in the Lewes District of East Sussex.

== History ==
The London Brighton and South Coast Railway opened a station called Keymer Junction on the Lewes line, just beyond the junction, towards the end of 1854, although, it appears that some trains may have called at Keymer Crossing from the completion of the junction in 1847. The station was closed on 1 November 1883 to allow for the proposed remodelling of the junction. However, when the railway later bought Parliamentary authority to abandon their planned changes, they were required to provide a replacement station to the north of the junction on the present site.

The second Keymer Junction station was opened on 1 August 1886 and retained that name until 1 July 1896 when it was renamed Wivelsfield. Construction of the new station involved widening a narrow, high embankment. Just over two months after it opened, heavy rain caused a landslip which caused a long section of the Up (northbound) platform, and the waiting room building, to collapse and fall down the embankment.

On 23 December 1899, a serious accident happened here, when a red signal was obscured by thick fog. A train from Brighton collided with a boat train from Newhaven Harbour at 40 miles per hour (64 km/h), and six passengers were killed and twenty seriously injured. The accident resulted in improvements made to the signalling at Keymer Junction.

== Access ==
There are three entrances to the station. Two of these are located where the railway line passes over Leylands Road (both on the south side of the road, one on each side of the railway), less than 40 metres from each other. Both entrances give access to the platforms via the same subway at the northern end of the station; the more easterly of the two entrances also includes the ticket office.

A third entrance of the station was built in March 2015 and is located by the new station car park in Gordon Road. It is the only entrance with step-free access (via a ramp) but is directly linked only to platform 2. For this reason, just one of the two platforms is fully wheelchair-accessible.

=== Future accessibility improvements ===
On 5 March 2020, Southern Railway, Mid Sussex District Council and Network Rail announced that £1 million of funding had been awarded by the Department for Transport in order to facilitate accessibility improvements at Wivelsfield station as part of the "Access for All" programme. The primary purpose of these improvements is to introduce step-free access to passengers wishing to travel northbound from Platform 1, where there is currently no step-free access.

Local MPs met with Network Rail in April 2022 to discuss potential options to improve accessibility, presenting two options: a new footbridge with lifts to cross between the two platforms; or a lift directly to the platform from street-level nearby the current subway entrance.

== Services ==
Services at Wivelsfield are operated by Southern and Thameslink using Class 377 and 700 EMUs.

The typical off-peak service in trains per hour is:

- 2 tph to Bedford via London Bridge
- 2 tph to London Victoria
- 2 tph to Brighton
- 2 tph to Eastbourne of which 1 continues to Ore and Hastings

During the peak hours, the station is served by one Southern train per day in each direction between London Bridge and Littlehampton.

On Sundays, the service between London Victoria and Eastbourne does not run.

| Preceding station | National Rail | Following station |
|---|---|---|
| Haywards Heath | Thameslink Brighton Main Line | Burgess Hill |
| Haywards Heath | Southern East Coastway Line | Plumpton or Cooksbridge |

== Potential expansion ==
In Autumn 2015 Network Rail released the Sussex Area Route Study, where two options for the proposed grade separation of Keymer Junction are detailed, both of which would transform the station dramatically.

Option 1 is the minimal option and creates a new platform 0 on the west side of the station served by a 3rd track from a new grade-separated flyover from Lewes.

Option 2 incorporates the features of Option 1, but also adds an additional 4th platform on the east side of the station as well, served by a 4th track on the line to Lewes. Whilst this would enable each line to the south to have a dedicated platform the primary benefit would be that the existing platforms could be used to turn back trains in either direction as needed without blocking the main lines.

As of 2024, no plans to implement any of these options have been announced.
