= Balcombe railway station =

Railway station in Sussex, England

Coordinates: 51°03′22″N 0°08′15″W

Balcombe
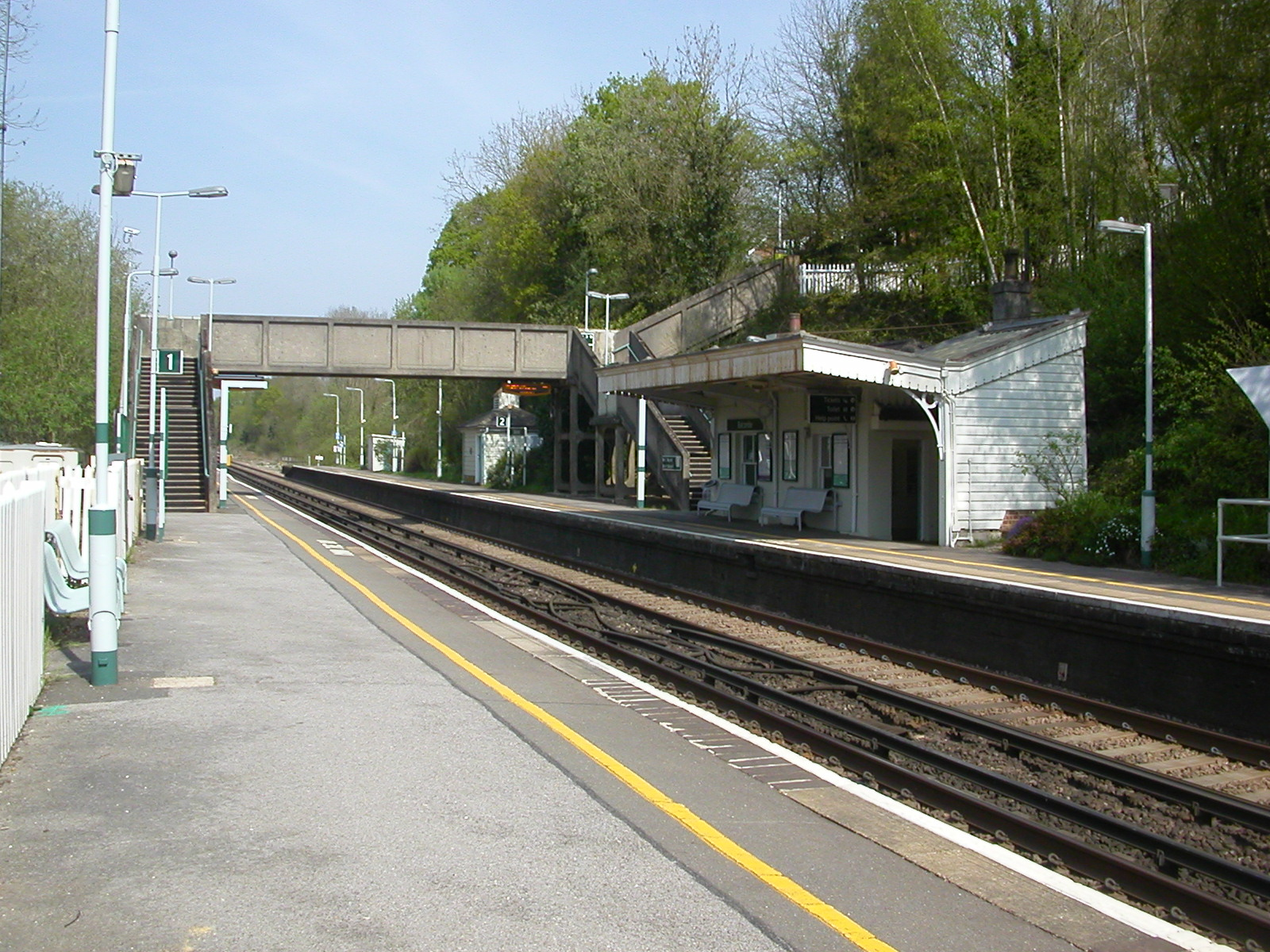

General information
- Location: Balcombe, District of Mid Sussex, England
- Grid reference: TQ306301
- Managed by: Southern
- Platforms: 2

Other information
- Station code: BAB
- Classification: DfT category E

History
- Opened: 12 July 1841

Passengers
- 2020/21: ▼49,106
- 2021/22: ▲0.124 million
- 2022/23: ▲0.163 million
- 2023/24: ▲0.181 million
- 2024/25: ▲0.213 million
Location
Notes
- Passenger statistics from the Office of Rail and Road

Balcombe railway station is a stop on the Brighton Main Line, serving the village of Balcombe, in West Sussex, England. It lies 33 miles 64 chains (54.4 km) down the line from London Bridge, via Redhill, and is situated between Three Bridges and Haywards Heath. It is managed by Southern, but trains calling at the station are operated by Thameslink.

== History ==
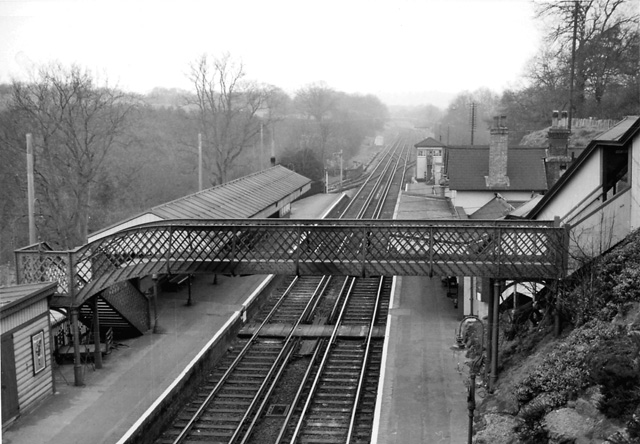
The station in 1961

The original station was opened in July 1841 by the London and Brighton Railway, which became the London Brighton and South Coast Railway in 1846. The station was resited to its present position in 1848 or 1849.

The station became part of the Southern Railway during the grouping of 1923. The station then passed on to the Southern Region of British Railways on nationalisation in 1948. When sectorisation was introduced in the 1980s, the station was served by Network SouthEast until the privatisation of British Rail.

== Services ==
All services at Balcombe are operated by Thameslink using Class 700 electric multiple units.

The typical off-peak service in trains per hour is:

- 2 tph to Bedford, via London Bridge
- 2 tph to Brighton

On Sundays, the service is reduced to hourly in each direction and northbound services run to Cambridge instead of Bedford.

Preceding station	National Rail	Following station
Three Bridges	Thameslink Brighton Main Line	Haywards Heath
