= John Nevill, 5th Marquess of Abergavenny =

British peer (1914–2000)

Lieutenant-Colonel The Most Honourable The Marquess of Abergavenny KG OBE
- Abergavenny in 1956
- Born: John Henry Guy Nevill; 8 November 1914; Knightsbridge, London
- Died: 23 February 2000 (aged 85); Royal Tunbridge Wells, Kent, England
- Spouse: Mary Patricia Harrison (m. 1938)
- Children: Lady Anne Whiteley; Lady Vivienne Lillingston; Lady Jane Nevill; Henry Nevill, Earl of Lewes; Lady Rose Clowes
- Parents: Guy Larnach-Nevill, 4th Marquess of Abergavenny (father); Isabel Nellie Larnach (mother)

Lieutenant Colonel John Henry Guy Nevill, 5th Marquess of Abergavenny (8 November 1914 – 23 February 2000), styled Earl of Lewes from 1938 to 1954, was a British peer.

== Early life and education ==
Lord Abergavenny was born at 43 Cadogan Square, Knightsbridge, London, the eldest son of Guy Nevill and Isabel Nellie Larnach. He was educated at Eton and Trinity College, Cambridge.

His father succeeded as the 4th Marquess of Abergavenny in 1938 on the death of his uncle, Henry Nevill, 3rd Marquess of Abergavenny, who died with no surviving male issue.

== Career ==
In 1936, Lord Abergavenny became an officer in the service of the Life Guards and fought in the Second World War, was invested as an Officer of the Order of the British Empire in 1945, and rose to the rank of Lieutenant-Colonel in 1946.

He was an Honorary Colonel of the Kent Yeomanry 1949–1961, and of the Kent and County of London Yeomanry (Sharpshooters) 1961–1962. He was a member of East Sussex County Council between 1947 and 1954 and County Alderman for East Sussex between 1954 and 1962. He was also Deputy Lieutenant of Sussex in 1955, Vice-Lieutenant of Sussex between 1970 and 1974 and later the first Lord Lieutenant of East Sussex from 1974 to 1989.

Aside from his army and political career, Lord Abergavenny was also a Director of Massey Ferguson between 1955 and 1985; a Director of Lloyds Bank between 1962 and 1985; Chairman of Lloyds Bank South-East Regional Board between 1962 and 1985; and a Director of Whitbread Investment.

Lord Abergavenny became a Knight of St John in 1976, a Knight Companion of the Order of the Garter in 1974, and was Chancellor of that Order between 1977 and 1994. In 1986, he was awarded an honorary Doctorate of Laws from the University of Sussex.

Abergavenny was also involved in horse racing. He rode in steeplechases between 1935 and 1939, and was elected to the National Hunt Committee in 1942, acting as a steward from 1948 to 1950, 1952–54 and 1960–62. He became a member of the Jockey Club in 1950 and vice-chairman of the Turf Board in 1967. He was also a director of both Cheltenham and Fontwell Racecourses. He served as a Trustee to the Ascot Authority in 1952 and became the Queen's representative at Ascot. His racing colours were scarlet with white cross-belts.

== Marriage and issue ==
On 4 January 1938, Lord Abergavenny married (Mary) Patricia Harrison, by whom he had five children:

- Lady Anne Patricia Nevill (born 25 October 1938), married Captain Martin Whiteley and had issue.
- Lady Vivienne Margaret Nevill (15 February 1941 – 10 September 2018), married Alan Lillingston and had issue.
- Lady Jane Elizabeth Nevill (7 April 1944 – 16 October 1946), died in infancy.
- Henry John Montague Nevill, Earl of Lewes (2 February 1948 – 2 April 1965), Page of Honour to Queen Elizabeth II 1962–64; died young.
- Lady Rose Nevill (born 15 July 1950); a bridesmaid at the wedding of Princess Margaret and Antony Armstrong-Jones. Lady Rose married George Clowes and had issue.

His only son, the Earl of Lewes, died of acute anaemia at age 17.

Lord Abergavenny died in 2000, aged 85. As he had no surviving male children, he was succeeded by his nephew, Christopher Nevill, 6th Marquess of Abergavenny.

== Arms ==
Coat of arms of John Nevill, 5th Marquess of Abergavenny
Crest Out of a ducal coronet or a bull's head proper, charged with a rose gules Escutcheon Gules a saltire argent, charged with a rose of the field, barbed and seeded proper Supporters On either side a bull argent, pied sable, armed, unguled, collared and chained or, the latter terminating in a staple or Motto Ne vile velis (Form no mean wish) Orders The Most Noble Order of the Garter – Knight Companion (KG) Badge A rose gules, barbed and seeded proper

== Notes ==
Court offices
Preceded by The Duke of Norfolk	Her Majesty's Representative at Ascot; 1972–1982	Succeeded by Sir Piers Bengough
Honorary titles
New title	Lord Lieutenant of East Sussex; 1974–1989	Succeeded by Sir Lindsay Bryson
Preceded by The Viscount Cobham	Chancellor of the Order of the Garter; 1977–1994	Succeeded by The Lord Carrington
Peerage of the United Kingdom
Preceded by Guy Larnach-Nevill	Marquess of Abergavenny; 1954–2000	Succeeded by Christopher Nevill
Preceded by Guy Larnach-Nevill	Baron Abergavenny; 1954–2000	In abeyance
