= Peregrine Cavendish, 12th Duke of Devonshire =

English peer and landowner

His Grace The Duke of Devonshire KCVO CBE DL

Chancellor of the University of Derby
- In office October 2008 – March 2018
- Deputy: John Coyne (2008–11); Kathryn Mitchell (2011–2018)
- Preceded by: Professor Leslie Wagner
- Succeeded by: William Cavendish, Earl of Burlington

Her Majesty's Representative at Ascot
- In office 1997–2011

Personal details
- Born: Peregrine Andrew Morny Cavendish; 27 April 1944 (age 82) Chatsworth House, Derbyshire, England
- Spouse: Amanda Heywood-Lonsdale (m. 1967)
- Children: William Cavendish, Earl of Burlington; Lady Celina Cavendish; Lady Jasmine Cavendish
- Parent(s): Andrew Cavendish, 11th Duke of Devonshire; Deborah Mitford
- Title: Duke of Devonshire
- Tenure: 3 May 2004 – present
- Other titles: Earl of Burlington (1944–1950); Marquess of Hartington (1950–2004)
- Predecessor: Andrew Cavendish, 11th Duke of Devonshire

Peregrine Andrew Morny Cavendish, 12th Duke of Devonshire (also known as "Stoker"; born 27 April 1944), is an English peer. He is the only surviving son of Andrew Cavendish, 11th Duke of Devonshire, and his wife, Deborah Mitford. He succeeded to the dukedom following the death of his father on 3 May 2004. Before his succession, he was styled Earl of Burlington from 1944 until 1950 and Marquess of Hartington between 1950 and 2004. He and his immediate family are owner-occupiers of Chatsworth House, had an estimated net worth of £910 million in 2024, and own large estates in Derbyshire, North Yorkshire and Ireland.

== Early life and education ==
Cavendish was born on 27 April 1944 in Chatsworth House, the second child and only surviving son of Andrew Cavendish, 11th Duke of Devonshire, and Deborah Mitford. His mother was the youngest of the Mitford sisters. His paternal uncle was William Cavendish, Marquess of Hartington, who married Kathleen "Kick" Kennedy (a member of the Kennedy family and younger sister of U.S. President John F. Kennedy). He is a first cousin of merchant banker Jonathan Guinness, 3rd Baron Moyne (born 1930), the Irish preservationist Desmond Guinness (1931–2020), Max Mosley (1940–2021), former President of the Fédération Internationale de l'Automobile (FIA), and fourth cousin of Diana, Princess of Wales. His niece was fashion model Stella Tennant (1970–2020).

He was educated at Eton College, at Exeter College, Oxford, where he read history, and at the Royal Agricultural College (now the Royal Agricultural University), Cirencester.

== Horse racing ==
The Duke is well known in the world of horse racing and served as Her Majesty's Representative at Ascot and chairman of Ascot Racecourse Ltd. In 1980 he was elected to the Jockey Club and in 1989 he was appointed its Senior Steward (that is, chairman). During his five-year term of office, he oversaw a number of changes within the racing industry, in particular the creation of the British Horseracing Board which is now the governing authority for British racing. He was appointed first chairman of the board in June 1993 and retired at the end of his term in 1996.

He was appointed Commander of the Order of the British Empire (CBE) for services to racing in 1997 and Knight Commander of the Royal Victorian Order (KCVO) in the 2009 New Year Honours for his services as Her Majesty's Representative at Ascot.

== Other interests ==
The Duke was appointed a trustee of the Wallace Collection in 2007 and is also a trustee of Sheffield Galleries and Museums Trust.

He is chairman of the Devonshire Arms Hotel Group, a chain of countryside hotels in North Yorkshire and Derbyshire, and deputy chairman of Sotheby's. He collects modern British and contemporary painting and sculpture, as well as works in other areas, many of which are on display at his family seat Chatsworth House. The Duke and Duchess and the house and estate grounds were featured in the BBC documentary series Chatsworth. In December 2012, he sold Auxiliary cartoon for the Head of a Young Apostle by Raphael for £29.7m at a Sotheby's auction.

As of 2016, he is the owner of Heywood Hill, a notable bookstore in London where his aunt Nancy Mitford used to work. The duke is a current patron of St Wilfrid's Hospice in Eastbourne. The duke has provided a Swaledale Ram as mascot for the Mercian Regiment since the regiment's inception; in 2017, the Ram presented was named Private Derby.

He was the third chancellor of the University of Derby, serving from 2008 to March 2018. He stepped down from the role in 2018 and his son and heir, William Cavendish, Earl of Burlington was nominated and installed as the fourth and current University Chancellor in March 2018.

The Duke is close to the British royal family and attended the wedding of Prince William and Catherine Middleton. The Duke then attended the service of thanksgiving for the life of Prince Philip, Duke of Edinburgh at Westminster Abbey and the funeral of Queen Elizabeth II in 2022, as well as the Coronation of Charles III and Camilla in 2023. Later that year, the Duke and Duchess sat in the royal carriage with King Charles III and Queen Camilla in the King's procession at Royal Ascot.

== Marriage and children ==
The Duke married Amanda Carmen Heywood-Lonsdale, daughter of Commander Edward Gavin Heywood-Lonsdale, on 28 June 1967. Her father was the grandson of millionaire Arthur Heywood-Lonsdale. Queen Elizabeth II and Queen Elizabeth The Queen Mother attended the wedding ceremony. They have three children:

- William Cavendish, Earl of Burlington (born 6 June 1969), heir apparent to the dukedom.
- Lady Celina Imogen Cavendish (born 4 October 1971), married to Alexander Carter.
- Lady Jasmine Nancy Cavendish (born 4 May 1973), married to Nicholas Dunne, son of Sir Thomas Dunne KG KCVO.

== Chatsworth House ==
One of the homes of the Duke and Duchess is Chatsworth House in Derbyshire. They are involved in the operation of the house as a tourist attraction. In 2019, the Duke and Duchess visited Sotheby's to view "Treasures From Chatsworth", including art and artifacts from Chatsworth House, that would be displayed in New York City.

== Titles, honours and arms ==
=== Titles ===
He succeeded as the 12th Duke of Devonshire, 12th Marquess of Hartington, the 7th Earl of Burlington, the 15th Earl of Devonshire, the 15th Baron Cavendish of Hardwick, and the 7th Baron Cavendish of Keighley on 3 May 2004.

In February 2010, the Duke announced his intention to give up his title if hereditary peers were removed from the House of Lords, on the basis that "the aristocracy is dead" and "because then it would be clear-cut what the people wanted, and it would be confusing to maintain hereditary titles".

=== Honours ===
- Knight Commander of the Royal Victorian Order (2008)
- Commander of the Order of the British Empire (1997)
- Chancellor of the University of Derby (October 2008 – March 2018)

Coat of arms of Peregrine Cavendish, 12th Duke of Devonshire
| Coronet A coronet of a duke. Crest A serpent nowed proper. Escutcheon Sable three stags' heads caboshed argent. Supporters Two bucks proper, each wreathed round the neck with a chaplet of roses, alternately argent and azure. Motto Cavendo tutus (Secure by caution). Orders The Royal Victorian Order - Knight Commander (KCVO) |

Court offices
| Preceded by Sir Piers Bengough | Her Majesty's Representative at Ascot; 1997–2011 | Succeeded by John Weatherby |
Peerage of England
| Preceded by Andrew Cavendish | Duke of Devonshire; 2004–present | Incumbent |
Orders of precedence in the United Kingdom
| Preceded by The Duke of Bedford | Gentlemen; The Duke of Devonshire | Succeeded by The Duke of Marlborough |
Academic offices
| Preceded by Professor Leslie Wagner | Chancellor of the University of Derby; 2008–2018 | Succeeded by William Cavendish, Earl of Burlington |
