= East Sussex =

County of England

- Non-metropolitan and ceremonial county
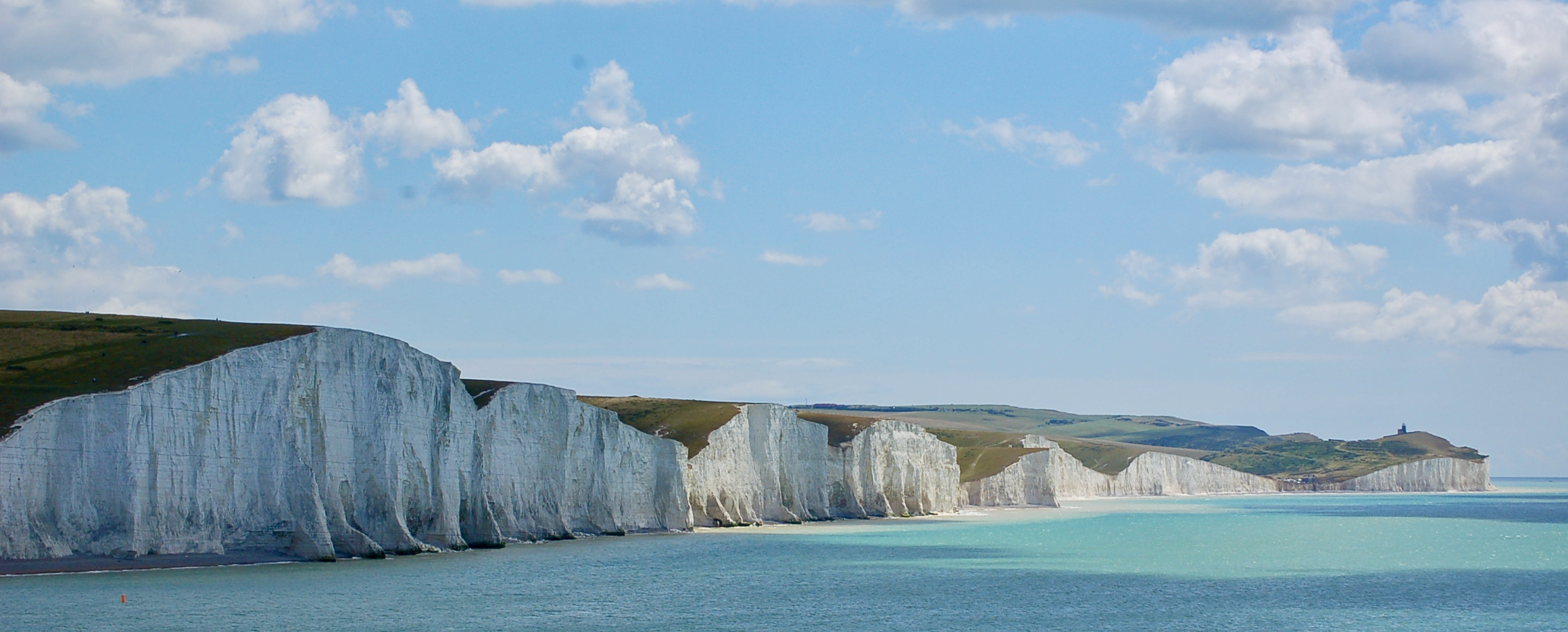
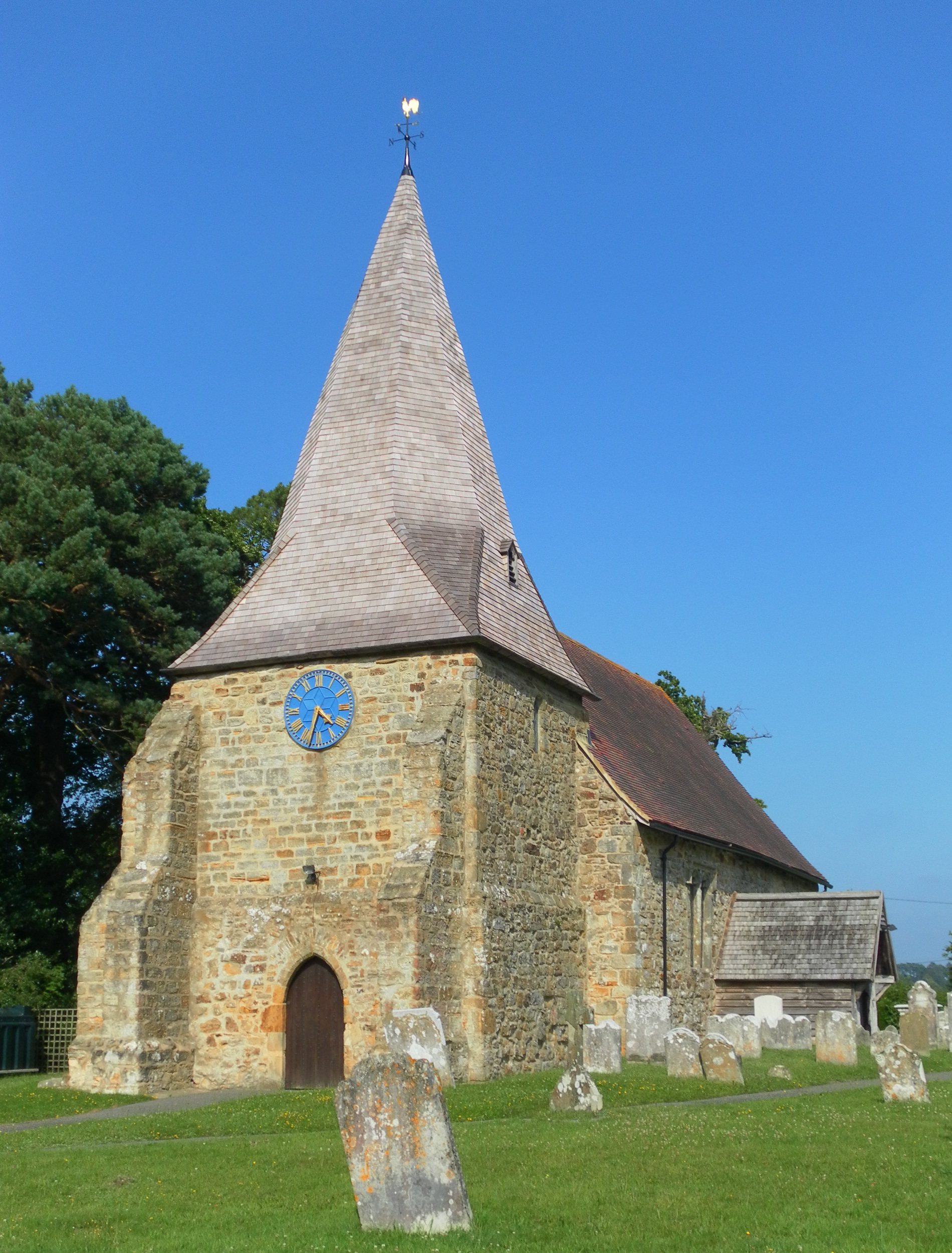
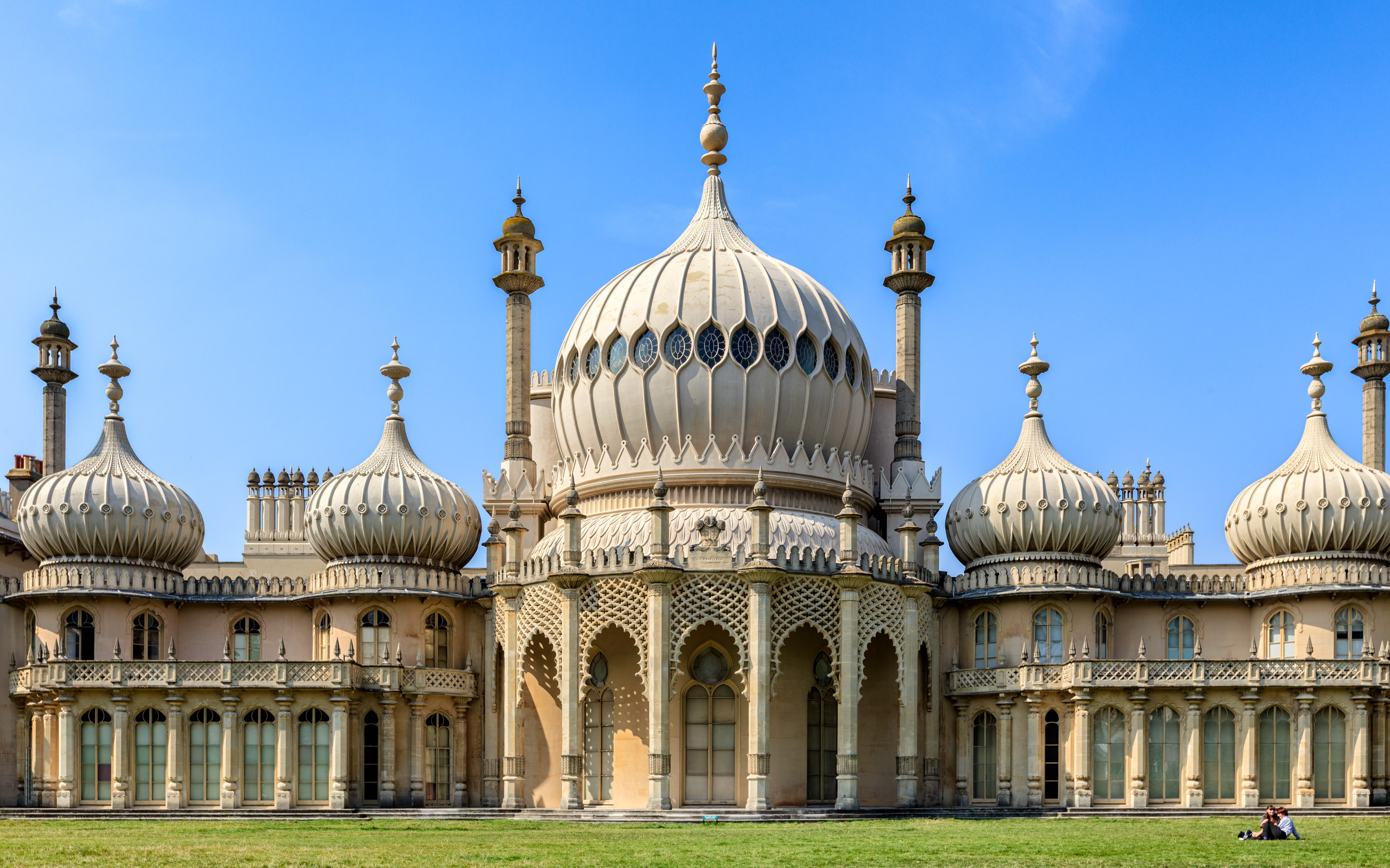
- The Seven Sisters cliffs, Mountfield church in the Weald, and the Royal Pavilion, Brighton

- Coordinates: 50.94°N 0.37°E
- Sovereign state: United Kingdom
- Constituent country: England
- Region: South East England
- Established: 1974; (Local Government Act 1972)
- Time zone: UTC+0 (GMT)
  - Summer (DST): UTC+1 (BST)
- UK Parliament: 9 MPs
- Ceremonial county
- Lord Lieutenant: Andrew Blackman (2021–)
- High Sheriff: Michael James Bedingfield
- Area: 1,791 km^{2} (692 sq mi)
  - Rank: 33rd of 48
- Population (2024): 844,752
  - Rank: 30th of 48
  - Density: 472/km^{2} (1,220/sq mi)
- Non-metropolitan county
- County council: East Sussex County Council
- Control: No overall control
- Admin HQ: Lewes
- Area: 1,709 km^{2} (660 sq mi)
  - Rank: 19th of 21
- Population (2024): 560,882
  - Rank: 21st of 21
  - Density: 328/km^{2} (850/sq mi)
- ISO 3166-2: GB-ESX
- GSS code: E10000011
- ITL: TLJ22
- Website: eastsussex.gov.uk
- Districts
- Districts of East Sussex; Unitary County council area
- Districts: List: Brighton and Hove; Lewes; Wealden; Eastbourne; Rother; Hastings

East Sussex is a ceremonial county in South East England. It is bordered by Kent to the north-east, West Sussex to the west, Surrey to the north-west, and the English Channel to the south. The largest settlement is the city of Brighton and Hove.

The county has an area of 1,792 km^{2} (692 sq mi) and had an estimated population of 844,752 in 2024. The largest settlements are on the coast, and include Brighton and Hove in the south-west, Eastbourne in the south, and Hastings in the south-east. Away from the coast the county is largely rural, and its settlements include Crowborough in the north, Hailsham in the south-centre, and Lewes in the west. For local government purposes East Sussex comprises a non-metropolitan county, with five districts, and the unitary authority of Brighton and Hove. East Sussex and West Sussex historically formed a single county, Sussex.

The north east of East Sussex is part of the Weald, a sandstone anticline that was once an extensive woodland. The highest point in this area is Crowborough Hill (242 m (794 ft)), part of the High Weald uplands. The south west of the county is part of the South Downs, a rolling chalk escarpment that stretches west into West Sussex and Hampshire. Ditchling Beacon (248 m (814 ft)) is the highest point. Where the downs reach the sea, they form high cliffs such as the Seven Sisters, where eroded dry valleys create an undulating skyline. The county does not contain large rivers, but its largest are the Rother, which forms part of the boundary with Kent, the Cuckmere, and the Ouse, which rises in West Sussex and flows through Lewes before reaching the English Channel at Newhaven.

== History ==
East Sussex is part of the historic county of Sussex, which has its roots in the ancient kingdom of the South Saxons, who established themselves there in the 5th century AD, after the departure of the Romans. Archaeological remains are plentiful, especially in the upland areas. The area's position on the coast has also meant that there were many invaders, including the Romans and later the Normans, following the defeat of the English army by William the Conqueror at the Battle of Hastings in 1066. Earlier industries included fishing, iron-making, and the wool trade, all of which have declined or been lost completely.

== Governance ==
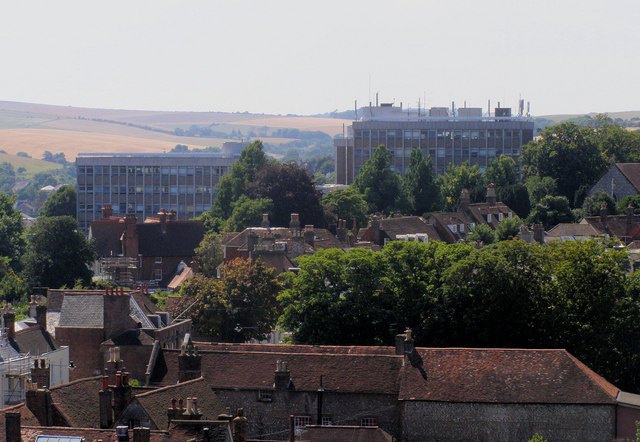
County Hall, Lewes

Sussex was historically sub-divided into six rapes. From the 12th century the three eastern rapes together and the three western rapes together had separate quarter sessions, with the county town of the three eastern rapes being Lewes. This situation was formalised by Parliament in 1865, and the two parts were made into administrative counties, each with its own elected county council in 1889 under the Local Government Act 1888. In East Sussex there were also three self-administered county boroughs: Brighton, Eastbourne and Hastings.

Arms of East Sussex County Council

Upon its foundation, East Sussex included the south of Tunbridge Wells and the south of Lamberhurst; by the Local Government Act 1894 these areas were transferred to Kent.

In 1974 East Sussex was made a non-metropolitan and ceremonial county, and the three county boroughs became districts within the county. At the same time the western boundary was altered, so that the Mid Sussex region (including Burgess Hill and Haywards Heath) was transferred to the non metropolitan county of West Sussex. In 1997, Brighton and Hove became a self-administered unitary authority; it was granted city status in 2000, whilst remaining part of the ceremonial county of East Sussex.

The area of East Sussex County Council's jurisdiction is divided into five local government districts. Three are large rural districts (from west to east): Lewes, Wealden, and Rother. Eastbourne and Hastings are mainly urban areas. The rural districts are further subdivided into civil parishes.

For parliamentary purposes, East Sussex (including Brighton and Hove) is divided into nine Westminster constituencies, returning nine Members of Parliament. The current boundaries were established by the Boundary Commission for England following its 2023 Periodic Review of Westminster constituencies and came into effect at the 2024 general election.

=== Future ===
In July 2026, the UK Government announced its intention to reorganise East Sussex into two unitary authority areas by April 2028. One will cover Brighton and Hove, with larger boundaries than the current district, and the other will cover the remainder of the county. Elections to the new authorities will take place in May 2027. In September 2026, this process was paused for review and local elections for West Sussex were reinstated for May 2027.

== Geography ==
=== Geology ===
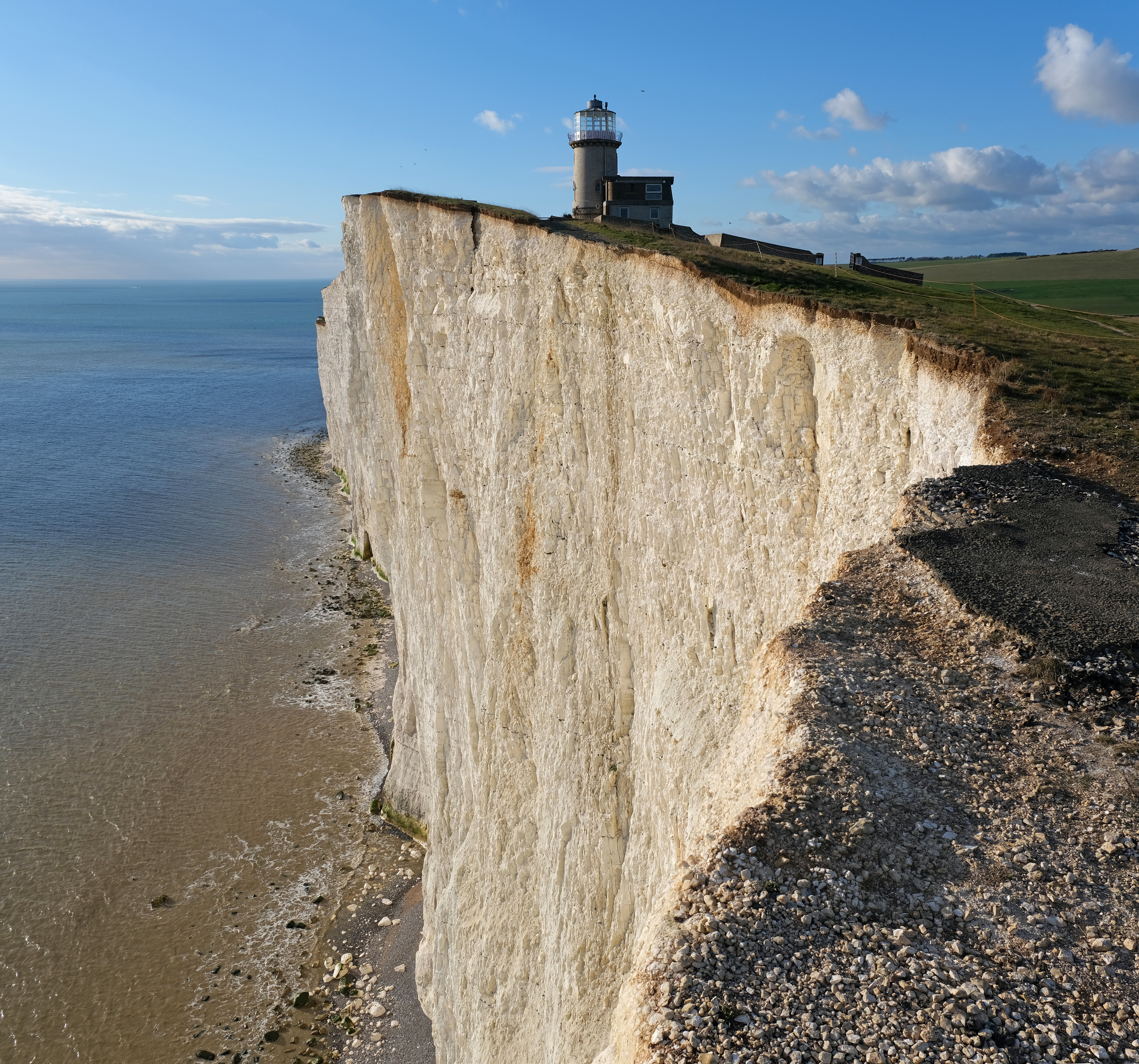
Beachy Head and Belle Tout Lighthouse, Eastbourne, East Sussex

Geologically, East Sussex is part of southern anticline of the Weald: the South Downs, a range of moderate chalk hills which run across the southern part of the county from west to east and mirrored in Kent by the North Downs. To the north lie parallel valleys and ridges, the highest of which is the Weald itself (the Hastings beds and Wealden Clay). The sandstones and clays meet the sea at Hastings; the Downs, at Beachy Head. The area contains significant reserves of shale oil, totalling 4.4 billion barrels of oil in the Wealden basin according to a 2014 study, which then Business and Energy Minister Michael Fallon said "will bring jobs and business opportunities" and significantly help with UK energy self-sufficiency. Fracking in the area is required to achieve these objectives, which has been opposed by environmental groups.

=== Climate ===
East Sussex, like most counties by the south coast, has an annual average total of around 1,750 hours of sunshine per year. This is much higher than the UK's average of about 1,340 hours of sunshine a year.

=== Relief and drainage ===
The relief of the county reflects the geology.

The chalk uplands of the South Downs occupies the coastal strip between Brighton and Eastbourne. There are two river gaps: the Rivers Ouse and Cuckmere. The Seven Sisters, where the Downs meet the sea, are the remnants of dry valleys cut into the chalk; they end at Beachy Head, 530 feet (162 m) above sea level. To the east of Beachy Head lie the marshlands of the Pevensey Levels, formerly flooded by the sea but now enclosed within a deposited beach. At Bexhill the land begins to rise again where the sands and clays of the Weald meet the sea; these culminate in the sandstone cliffs east of Hastings. Further east are the Pett Levels, more marshland, beyond which is the estuary of the River Rother. On the far side of the estuary are the dunes of Camber Sands. The highest point in the county is Ditchling Beacon on the South Downs, which has a maximum elevation of 248 m (814 ft) and is classed as a Marilyn.

The Weald occupies the northern borderlands of the county. Between the Downs and Weald is a narrow stretch of lower lying land; many of the rivers and streams occupying this area originate in the Weald. The High Weald is heavily wooded in contrast to the South Downs; the Low Weald less so. Part of the Weald is the Ashdown Forest.

=== Settlements ===
The location of settlements in East Sussex has been determined both by its history and its geography. The original towns and villages tended to be where its economy lay: fishing along the coast and agriculture and iron mining on the Weald. Industry today tends to be geared towards tourism, particularly along the coastal strip where towns such as Bexhill-on-Sea, Eastbourne, and Hastings are located. Newhaven and Rye are ports, although the latter is also of historical importance. Peacehaven and Seaford serve as dormitory towns. Away from the coast are former market towns such as Hailsham, Heathfield and Uckfield; Crowborough is a centre for the Ashdown Forest. Lewes, the County town of East Sussex; Battle, with its Norman Conquest beginnings, and Wadhurst are the other three towns of significance.

== Economy and demography ==
Gross value added (GVA) at current basic prices for non-metropolitan East Sussex (excluding Brighton and Hove), based on Office for National Statistics local authority data, in millions of pounds (sum of Eastbourne, Hastings, Lewes, Rother, and Wealden districts):

Year	Gross value added (£ million)
1998	4,610
2000	5,070
2005	6,199
2010	6,940
2015	8,062
2019	9,342
2020	9,219
2021	9,885
2022	10,544
2023	11,576

Claimants of Jobseeker's Allowance or Income Support (DWP)
Area	August 2012	August 2001	Population (April 2011)
East Sussex	18,790	34,335	526,671
% of resident population (2011 census for August 2012 column; 2001 census for August 2001 column)	3.6%	7.0%	–
Hastings	6.7%	12.1%	90,254
Eastbourne	4.3%	8.2%	99,412
Rother	3.1%	6.5%	90,588
Lewes	3.0%	5.7%	97,502
Wealden	1.8%	4.2%	148,915

=== Economic activities ===
Measured by the number of registered companies, East Sussex is not a major manufacturing or industrial area of the United Kingdom. Of the companies registered, the leading category in 2023 was "construction", followed by "real estate activities". An important contribution to the county's economy comes from the fact that many residents of Brighton and Hove, Eastbourne and Hastings commute to London or work remotely for companies outside the county.

There were 1,720 agricultural holdings in East Sussex (excluding Brighton and Hove) in 2022, with a total farmed area of 108,825 hectares. They employed just over 4000 people and, in 2020, produced a gross value added of £66 million. Livestock grazing accounts for almost 40% of the farmed area, with there being approximately six times as many sheep as cattle. Fishing is limited but there are still fishing fleets, notably at Rye and Hastings, although the number of boats is much reduced. Historically, the fisheries were of great importance.

== Landmarks ==
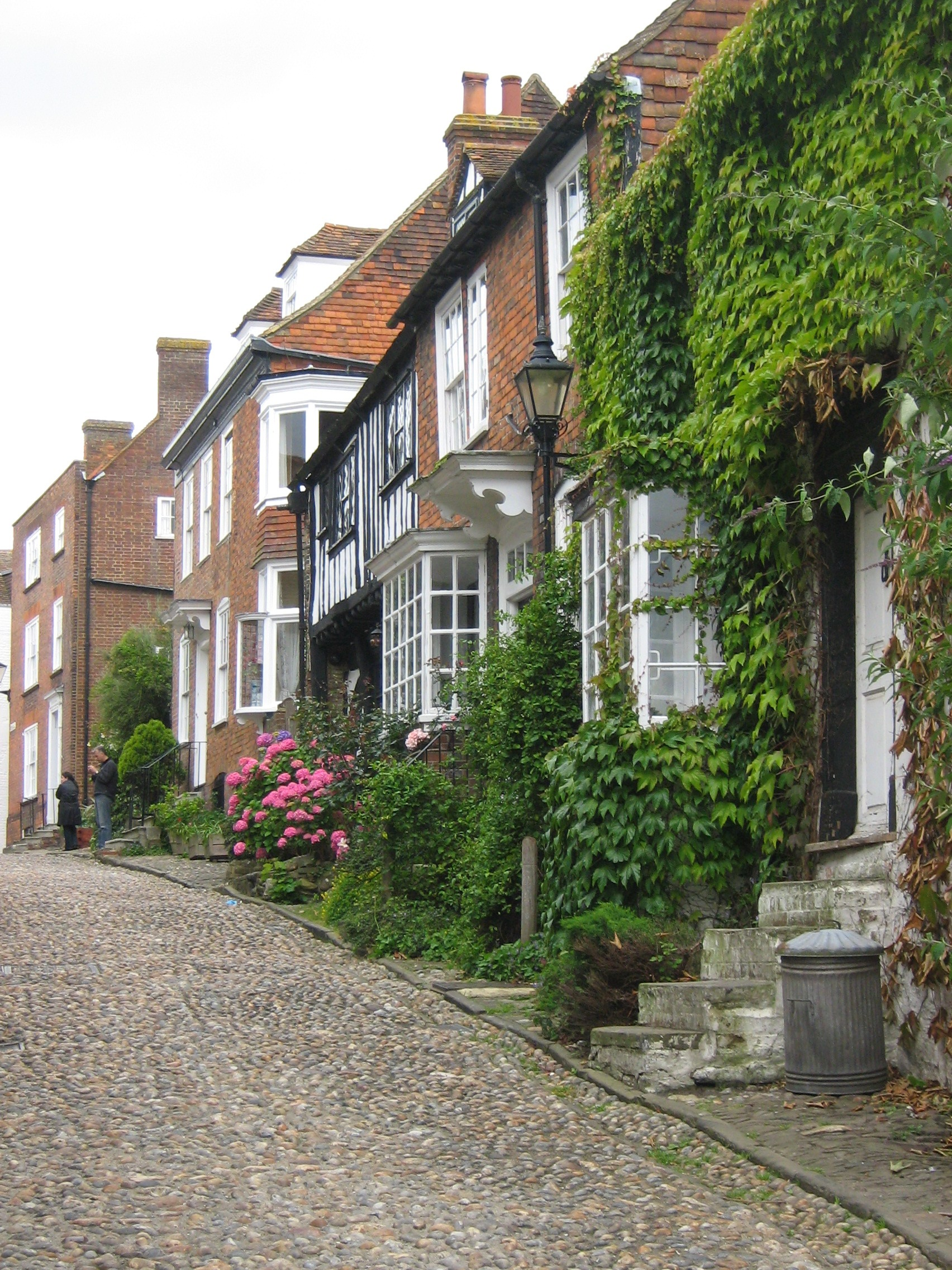
Mermaid Street in Rye showing typically steep slope and cobbled surface

The Seven Sisters area forms part of the South Downs National Park. Other notable natural landmarks include Beachy Head and the low-lying coast around Normans Bay.

East Sussex also contains numerous historic landmarks. There are castles at Bodiam, Herstmonceux, Lewes and Pevensey; and defence works such as the Martello towers and Eastbourne Redoubt. Other notable sites include Battle Abbey, Bateman's, Hammerwood Park and the University of Sussex campus at Falmer. Bexhill-on-Sea is also home to the De La Warr Pavilion. East Sussex also includes two chalk hill figures, being the Litlington White Horse and the Long Man of Wilmington, which are both situated in the Sussex Downs.

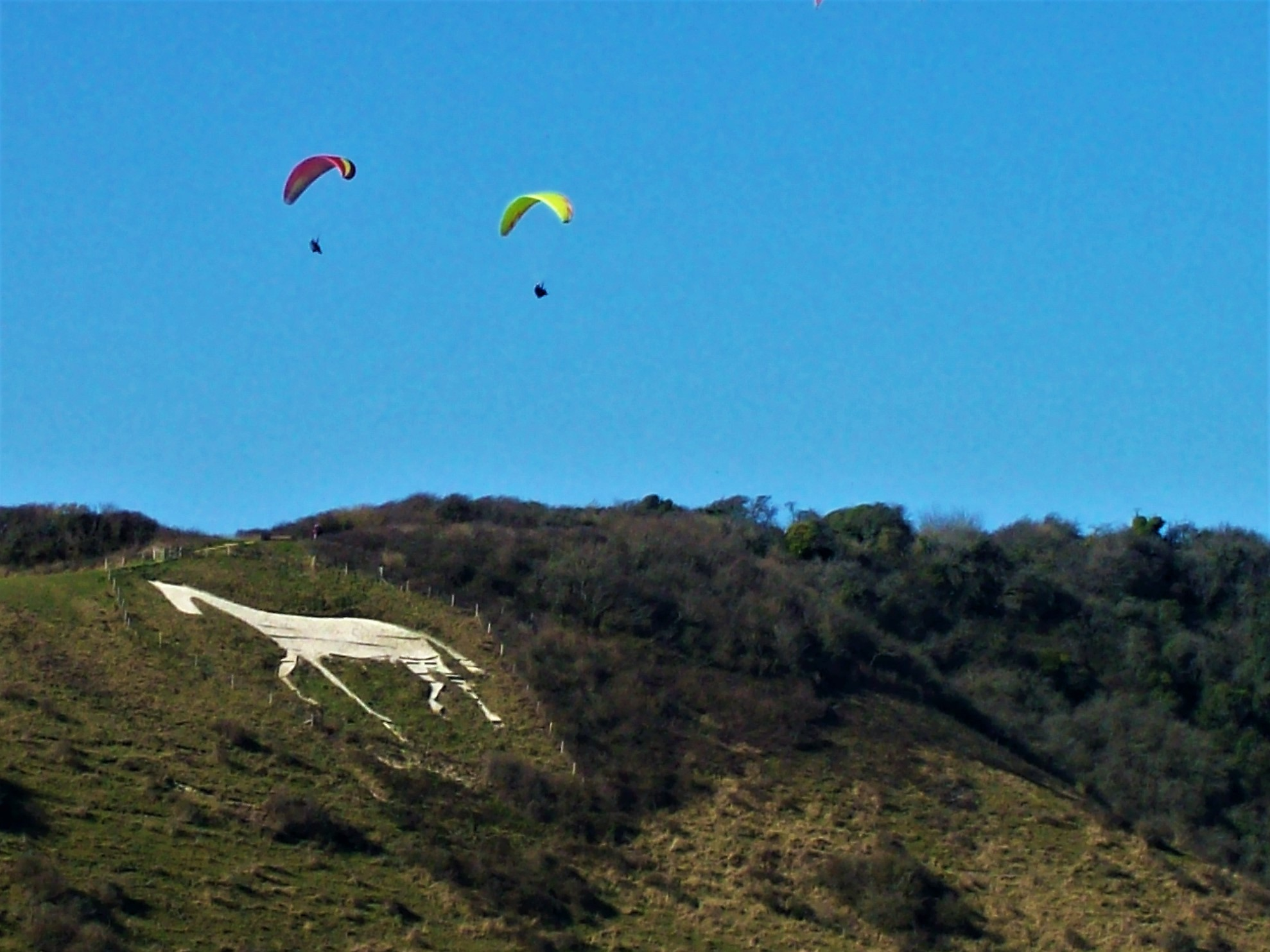
The Litlington White Horse in the village of Litlington

== Transport ==
=== Roads ===
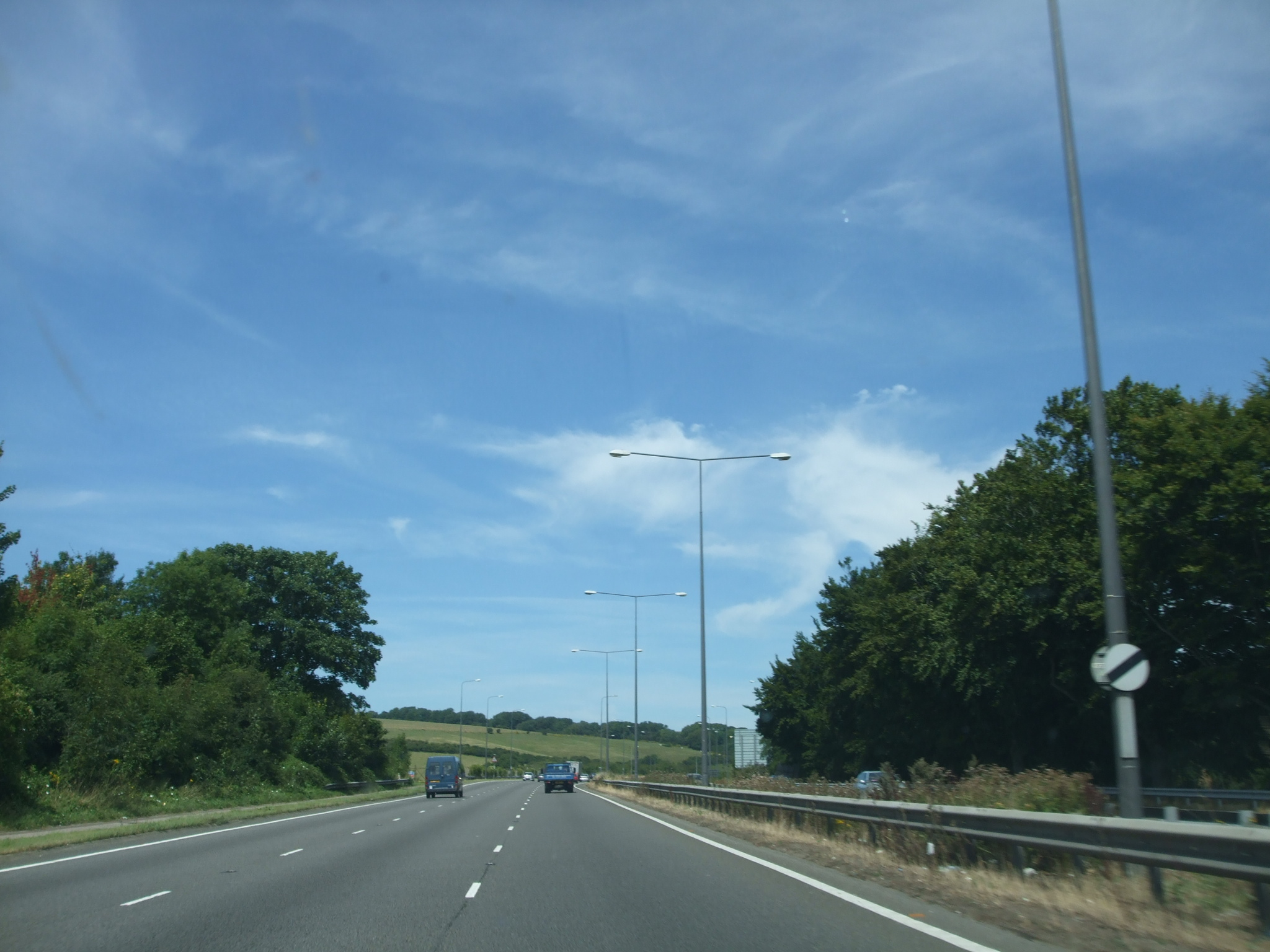
The A23, one of the major north–south routes.

East Sussex has no motorways, and even dual carriageways are sparse in the county. The main roads through the county are those part of the radial pattern from London: the A21 from Kent to Hastings; the A22 from Surrey to Eastbourne; and the A23 from Gatwick to Brighton. Cross-country routes include the A26 which carries traffic from Newhaven and Lewes north into Kent; and the south coast trunk route, which starts in Folkestone (Kent) as the A259 trunk road, and traverses the south coast to Eastbourne, where it becomes the A27 trunk road and heads westwards towards Chichester in West Sussex and ultimately to Honiton in Devon. The county's main roads suffer from congestion and traffic problems, particularly the A27, which connects Eastbourne with Portsmouth.

Bus routes serve all the main areas of settlement and many of the villages in the county.

=== Railways ===
The railways serve the main towns in a similar fashion to the roads. Until the closures of many branch railways in the 20th century, rural East Sussex was well-served by rail: few such branch lines escaped the Beeching cuts so that today only main-line services remain. They include the East Coastway Line (including the Marshlink Line); the Hastings line; and the Uckfield branch of the Oxted Line. There are three heritage railways: the Kent and East Sussex Railway operates from Tenterden in Kent to Bodiam; the Bluebell Railway from Sheffield Park to East Grinstead; and the Lavender Line Steam Railway is a one-mile line at Isfield, near Uckfield.

Trains in the county are operated by Southern, Southeastern, Thameslink and Great Western Railway. Southern is the key operator for the county, operating services along the West Coastway and East Coastway routes, as well as trains from Brighton, Eastbourne, Seaford and Hastings to London Victoria, and to a lesser extent London Bridge, which is also where trains to/from Uckfield go. Southeastern operate trains from London Charing Cross to Hastings. Thameslink operate trains from Brighton to Bedford.

=== Airports ===
There are no airports offering scheduled flights in East Sussex. London's second airport, Gatwick Airport, is a short distance from East Sussex and easily accessible by road and rail from most of the county. Despite its name, Brighton City Airport, the former Shoreham Airport, is in West Sussex. Three airfields service general aviation, helicopters and flying schools: Spilsted Farm near Hastings; Kittyhawk Aerodrome near Lewes;, and Deanland Airfield, also near Lewes. Sussex Gliding Club operate from Kitsons field at The Broyle on the outskirts of Ringmer.

=== Ferries ===
A ferry operates from Newhaven to Dieppe in France twice daily in the off-season and three times daily in the summer. Both vehicles and foot passengers are accepted.

=== Footpaths ===
Among the long-distance footpaths in East Sussex are the South Downs Way; 1066 Country Walk, High Weald Landscape Trail, Saxon Shore Way, Sussex Border Path, Sussex Ouse Valley Way, Vanguard Way, Wealdway and The Monarch's Way.

== Education ==
The Universities of Sussex and Brighton are based in East Sussex, with facilities in Brighton, Falmer and Hastings.

Over 150 primary schools serve the area; many of them small and local in scope.

State and independent secondary schools include Lewes Old Grammar School, which celebrated its 500th anniversary in 2012. Overall, more than 50 serve East Sussex, including further education colleges in larger towns.

A number of independent boarding schools that also cater to day students are located in the county, including Brighton College and Roedean. The Pestalozzi Children's Village, an international foundation, is located at Sedlescombe.

== Culture ==
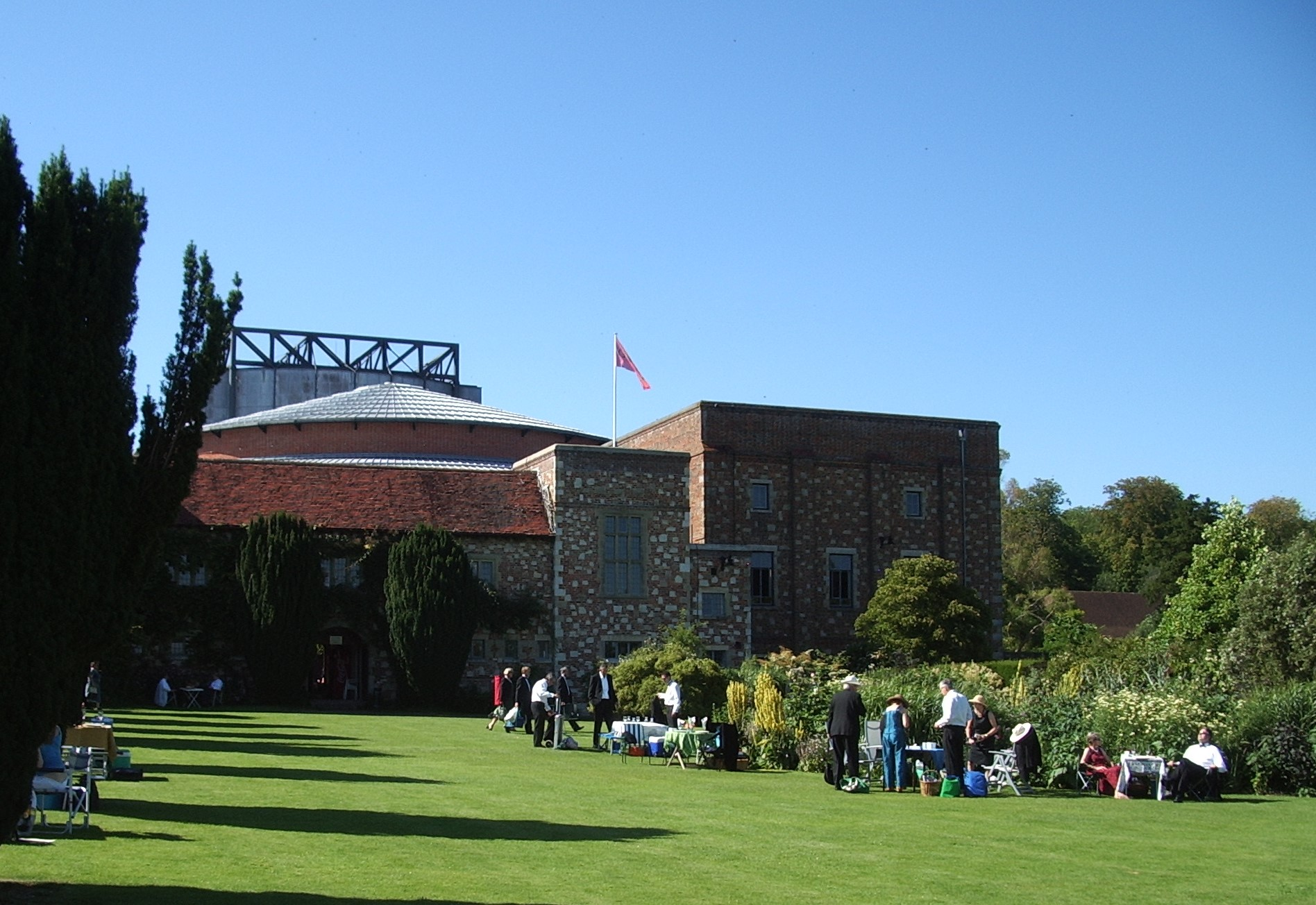
Theatre at Glyndebourne

East Sussex has many theatres and performance venues, including the Theatre Royal in Brighton and the Brighton Dome, the Attenborough Centre for the Creative Arts at the University of Sussex, the Royal Hippodrome Theatre and Devonshire Park Theatre in Eastbourne, and the White Rock Theatre in Hastings. The annual Glyndebourne Festival Opera takes place at Glyndebourne near Lewes. The Brighton Festival is a large multi-arts festival held every May.

There is a wide range of museums and art galleries in East Sussex. Notable amongst these are the Brighton Museum & Art Gallery; the Hove Museum of Creativity; the Hastings Museum and Art Gallery; Hastings Contemporary; Charleston Farmhouse near Lewes, with an exhibition devoted to the artistic work of the Bloomsbury Group; the De La Warr Pavilion in Bexhill-on-Sea, which houses a contemporary art gallery; and the Towner Eastbourne gallery, which celebrated its centenary in 2023 and hosted the award ceremony for the Turner Prize on 5 December of that year.

== Tourism ==
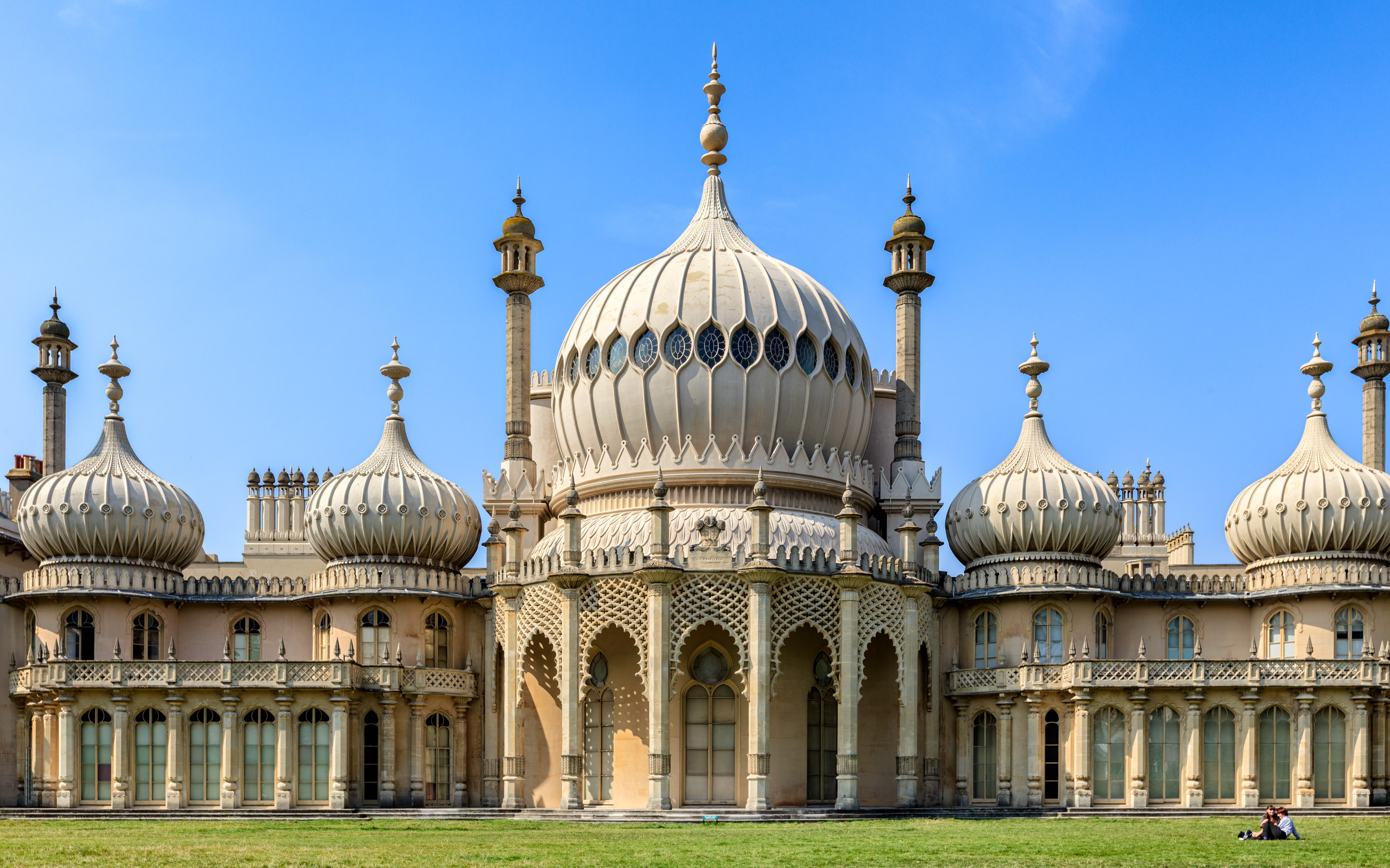
The Royal Pavilion

The county's coastal towns, including Brighton and Hove, Bexhill-on-Sea, Hastings and Eastbourne, are popular visitor destinations, particularly in summer. Brighton and Hove have a range of attractions including the Royal Pavilion. Beginning in 1787, it was built in three stages as a seaside retreat for George, Prince of Wales, who became King George IV in 1820. A more recent attraction is the Brighton i360, a 162 m observation tower on the seafront.

Brighton Palace Pier, Eastbourne Pier and Hastings Pier serve as entertainment centres that attract many visitors. Several other piers built in the heyday of day tripper visits by train no longer exist, including St Leonards Pier, in St Leonards-on-Sea, and the West Pier in Brighton, parts of which can still be seen in the sea opposite the Brighton i360. Originally, the profits from the i360 were seen as a potential source of funds to rebuild the West Pier, but that now seems unlikely. Other important tourist attractions within East Sussex include Ashdown Forest, Drusillas Zoo Park near Alfriston and Michelham Priory. The county has two narrow-gauge railways, the Hastings Miniature Railway, which is powered by a steam locomotive, and Volk's Electric Railway, which runs from Brighton's Palace Pier to Brighton Marina along the seafront. Volk's is the oldest operational electric railway in the world. There are also several castles that attract many visitors, as indicated in the Landmarks section above.

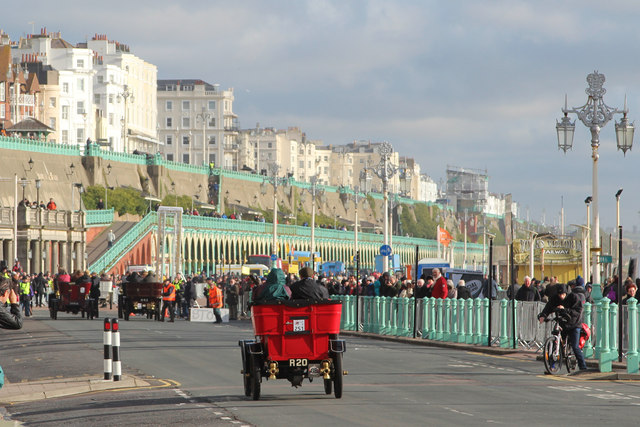
A 1903 De Dion-Bouton arrives in Brighton in the 2012 Veteran Car Run

Annual events also promote tourism to the county. Brighton Pride is one of the UK's largest and oldest pride parades and other pride events take place at Eastbourne and Hastings. The London to Brighton Veteran Car Run is the world's longest-running motoring event. To qualify, cars must have been built before 1905. It is also the world's largest gathering of veteran cars. The race finishes on Madeira Drive in Brighton.

Other popular destinations in the county include Alfriston; Battle, site of the Battle of Hastings; Ditchling; Herstmonceux, with the castle of the same name; Lewes; Rottingdean; and Rye.

== Traditions ==
The Lewes Bonfire is a set of bonfire celebrations held on Guy Fawkes Night, which both celebrates the uncovering of the Gunpowder Plot in 1605 and commemorates the memory of the seventeen Protestant martyrs from Mayfield burned at the stake between 1555 and 1557. It has a history of religious antagonism and anti-Catholic imagery, including the burning of an effigy of the Pope. The event attracts tens of thousands of spectators every year. There are also many other bonfire societies in East Sussex.

== Sport ==
=== Football ===
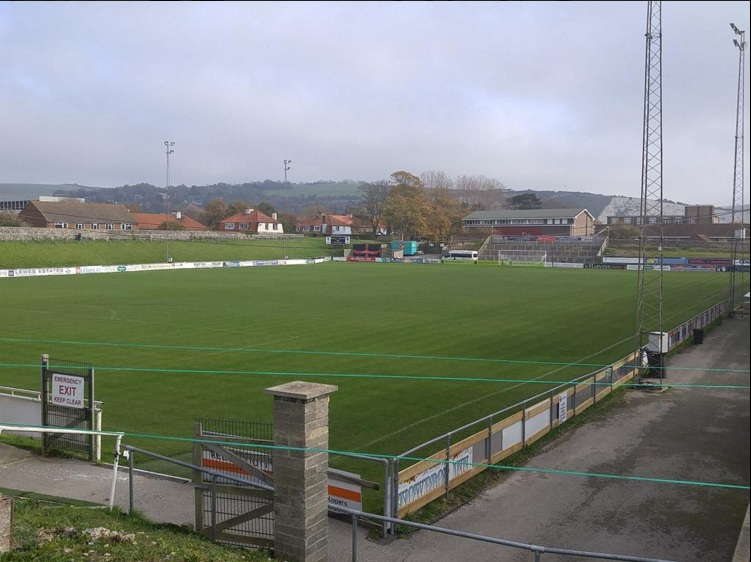
The Dripping Pan, home of Lewes FC men's and women's teams

Brighton & Hove Albion F.C., based in Brighton and Hove, is the county's highest-ranked football club and plays in the Premier League. It reached the FA Cup final in 1983. Other clubs in the county include Eastbourne Town F.C. and Lewes F.C., the latter of which also fields a women's team.

=== Cricket ===
Cricket had its origins in the counties of Kent, Surrey and Sussex. There is no team representing East Sussex. It combines with West Sussex as the Sussex County Cricket Club, playing first-team matches at the County Ground in Hove and reserve-team matches in both East and West Sussex. There are around 25 local clubs playing the game in East Sussex.

=== Rugby ===
There are around 15 rugby clubs in East Sussex, with many of them fielding several teams including women's and girls' teams. Seaford Rugby Club claims the distinction of playing its home games below sea level.

=== Cycling ===
The fourth stage of the 1994 Tour de France ended in Brighton after departing from Dover. The route included a climb over Ditchling Beacon. The hilly nature of the Downs presents a good challenge for cyclists and there are at least eight cycling clubs in East Sussex.

=== Golf ===
There are 42 golf courses in East Sussex, many on downland. Four of these (two in Brighton and Hove, one in Eastbourne and one in Crowborough) are public courses; the remainder private, semi-private or resorts.

=== Other sports ===
Other popular sports include sailing, bowls, stoolball, and tennis.

== See also ==
- Outline of England
- Historic coats of arms of East Sussex County Council
- Listed buildings in East Sussex
- History of local government in Sussex
- List of High Sheriffs of East Sussex
- List of hills of East Sussex
- The Keep: the county's archive and record office, near Falmer
- List of Lord Lieutenants of East Sussex
- Healthcare in Sussex
