= Pratt's =

Gentleman's club in London, England

Coordinates: 51°30′22.8″N 0°08′24.0″W

Pratt's Club
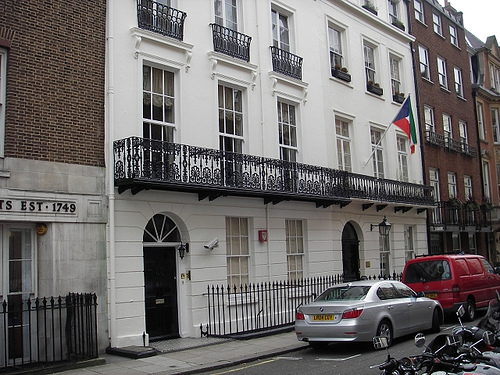
- Company type: Gentlemen's club
- Founded: 1857
- Headquarters: 14 Park Place, London, United Kingdom

Pratt's is a gentlemen's club in London, England. It was established in 1857, with premises in a house in Park Place, off St James's Street, and close to the Ritz.

== History ==
The club takes its name from William Nathaniel Pratt, who lived there from 1841. Pratt was steward to the Duke of Beaufort, who called at the house with his friends one evening, and who enjoyed themselves so much that they returned time and again. After Pratt's death in 1860, the club was continued by his widow, Sophia, and son, Edwin.

The premises were later acquired by the 11th Duke of Devonshire.

It has around 600 members, but only 14 can dine at one time at the single table in the basement dining room. The club has two rooms: a dining room, and a sitting room/smoking room. Also housed in the premises is a billiard room (which is primarily used for guests to hang their coats on the chairs), a larger dining room used for lunches or private parties, a small suite that members are required to book well in advance, and the steward's quarters above.

As the building is heritage-listed (certain parts of it date back to the 16th century), there is no air conditioning, nor is there a lift; there are roughly 100 stairs from the basement club to the steward's quarters.

To avoid confusion, all male staff members are referred to as 'George'.

The present owner is William Cavendish, Earl of Burlington.

== Notable members ==
Notable members have included Charles Wyndham, Harold Macmillan, Randolph Churchill, Duncan Sandys and the cartoonist Osbert Lancaster, who featured the armchair and stuffed fish in the members lounge in many of his cartoons.

== See also ==
- List of London's gentlemen's clubs
- Blades Club
