= His Majesty's Representative at Ascot =

The holder of the British royal household post of His or Her Majesty's Representative at Ascot heads the Ascot Office at St. James's Palace and is responsible for admitting people to the Royal Enclosure at Ascot Racecourse.

== List of representatives ==
Until 1901, the position was held by the Master of the Buckhounds. Since then, the incumbents have been named individuals, as follows:

- 1901–1934: Victor Spencer, 3rd Baron Churchill (1st Viscount Churchill from 1902)
- 1934–1945: Gavin Hamilton, 2nd Baron Hamilton of Dalzell, KT

Between 1934 and 1945 the responsibilities of the office were shared between Lord Hamilton of Dalzell and the Earl of Granard, who was designated His Majesty's Comptroller at Ascot.

- 1945–1972: Bernard Fitzalan-Howard, 16th Duke of Norfolk, KG GCVO GBE PC
- 1972–1984: Lieutenant-Colonel John Nevill, 5th Marquess of Abergavenny, KG OBE
- 1984–1997: Colonel Sir Piers Bengough, KCVO OBE DL
- 1997–2011: Peregrine Cavendish, Marquess of Hartington (12th Duke of Devonshire from 2004), KCVO CBE DL
- 2011–2020: Sir Johnny Weatherby, KCVO
- 2020–present: Sir Francis Brooke, Bt

== See also ==
- British Champions Day
- List of British flat horse races
