= List of hills of East Sussex =

This is a list of hills in East Sussex. Many of these hills are important historical, archaeological and nature conservation sites, as well as popular hiking and tourist destinations in the county of East Sussex in southeast England.

== Colour key ==
| Class | Prominence |
|---|---|
| Marilyns | 150 – 599 m |
| HuMPs | 100 – 149 m |
| TuMPs | 30 – 99 m |
| Unclassified | 0 – 29 m |

The table is colour-coded based on the classification or "listing" of the hill. The types that occur in East Sussex are Marilyns, HuMPs and TuMPs, listings based on topographical prominence. "Prominence" correlates strongly with the subjective significance of a summit. Peaks with low prominences are either subsidiary tops of a higher summit or relatively insignificant independent summits. Peaks with high prominences tend to be the highest points around and likely to have extraordinary views. A Marilyn is a hill with a prominence of at least 150 metres or about 500 feet. A "HuMP" (the acronym comes from "Hundred Metre Prominence) is a hill with a prominence of at least 100 but less than 150 metres.

In this table Marilyns are in beige and HuMPs in lilac. A "TuMP" as defined here is a hill with a prominence of at least 30 but less than 100 metres. The term "sub-Marilyn" or "sub-HuMP" is used, e.g. in the online Database of British and Irish Hills to indicate hills that fall just below the threshold. To qualify for inclusion, hills must either be 200 metres or higher with a prominence of at least 30 metres, below 200 metres with a prominence of at least 90 metres (the threshold for a sub-HuMP) or be in some other way notable. For further information see the Lists of mountains and hills in the British Isles and the individual articles on Marilyns, HuMPs, and TuMPs. By way of contrast, see also the article listing Tumps (a traditional term meaning a hillock, mound, barrow or tumulus).

== Table ==
| Hill | Height (m) | Prom. (m) | Grid ref. | Class | Parent | Range/Region | Remarks | Image |
|---|---|---|---|---|---|---|---|---|
| Ditchling Beacon | 248 | 214 | TQ331130 | East Sussex county top (historical and current), Marilyn, HuMP, TuMP | Leith Hill | South Downs | East Sussex's county top. Trig point near summit which is 4 metres to the north. | |
| Crowborough Hill | 242 | 159 | TQ510306 | Marilyn, HuMP, TuMP | Leith Hill | High Weald | East Sussex's second highest point Summit on A26. | |
| Black Hill | 223 | 60 | TQ474311 (est.) | TuMP | Crowborough Hill | High Weald | East Sussex's third highest point. | |
| Firle Beacon | 217 | 196 | TQ485059 | Marilyn, HuMP, TuMP | Leith Hill | South Downs | Summit is on knoll, 10 metres west of trig point. | |
| Wilmington Hill | 214 | 192 | SU794183 | Marilyn, HuMP, TuMP | Leith Hill | South Downs | Summit is 25 metres ENE of trig point. | |
| Hindleap Hill | 203 | 66 | TQ414321 (est.) | TuMP | Crowborough Hill | South Downs | | |
| Saxonbury Hill | 202 | 70 | TQ577329 (est.) | TuMP | Black Down, Sussex | South Downs | | |
| Willingdon Hill | 201 | 110 | TQ225108 (est.) | HuMP, TuMP | Wilmington Hill | South Downs | Summit on tumulus 20 metres north of trig point. | |
| Newmarket Hill | 200 | 107 | TQ362067 (est.) | HuMP, TuMP | Ditchling Beacon | South Downs | | |
| North's Seat | 175 | 109 | TQ843119 (est.) | HuMP, TuMP | Crowborough | High Weald | Trig point | |
| Cliffe Hill | 164 | 150 | TQ434107 | Marilyn, HuMP, TuMP | Butser Hill | South Downs | Summit is grass bank by golf course green, 10 metres SSE of trig point. | |

== See also ==
- List of mountains and hills of the United Kingdom
- List of Marilyns in England
