= Christopher Ball (linguist) =

British academic

Sir Christopher John Elinger Ball (born 22 April 1935) is a British academic, who served as Warden of Keble College, Oxford, from 1980 to 1988, and as the first Chancellor of the University of Derby, from 1995 to 2003.

== Life ==
Ball was educated at St George's School, Harpenden, and served in the Parachute Regiment as a Second Lieutenant (1955 to 1956). He then read English at Merton College, Oxford, where he was a scholar, obtaining a first-class degree in 1959. After lecturing in Oxford, he moved to be a lecturer in comparative linguistics at the School of Oriental and African Studies (part of the University of London) in 1961. He returned to the University of Oxford in 1964 as a Fellow and Tutor in English at Lincoln College, where he also served as bursar from 1972 to 1979. In 1980, he was appointed Warden of Keble College, Oxford, a post that he held until 1988, the same year that he was knighted. He was appointed an Honorary Fellow of Lincoln College in 1981, Merton College in 1987, and of Keble College in 1989. From 1995 to 2003, he served as the first Chancellor of the University of Derby which had achieved University status in 1992.

He was the joint founding editor (with Angus Cameron) of Toronto Dictionary of Old English (1970). He has written various works on educational and linguistic matters, as well as some poetry (as "John Elinger").

Academic offices
Preceded by None (role created)	Chancellor of the University of Derby; 1995 - 2003	Succeeded by Professor Leslie Wagner
