= Lord Lieutenant of East Sussex =

Civil post in East Sussex, England

This is a list of people who have served as Lord Lieutenant of East Sussex since the creation of the post and the county on 1 April 1974.

== Lord Lieutenants of East Sussex ==
- John Nevill, 5th Marquess of Abergavenny 1 April 1974 – 9 November 1989
- Sir Lindsay Bryson 9 November 1989 – 4 May 2000
- Phyllida Stewart-Roberts 4 May 2000 – 19 August 2008
- Peter Field 19 August 2008 - 17 August 2021
- Andrew Blackman 18 August 2021 -
