= Leslie Wagner =

British academic

Leslie Wagner, CBE (born 21 February 1943) is a British academic, who has been Vice-Chancellor of two universities and the second Chancellor of the University of Derby.

Wagner was educated at Salford Grammar School and obtained a BA and MA at Manchester University. He worked for the British government until 1970, when he became a lecturer in economics at the Open University. He was later Head of Economics at the Polytechnic of Central London, becoming Vice-Chancellor of the University of North London in 1987. From 1994 to 2003, he was Vice-Chancellor of Leeds Metropolitan University.

Wagner served as the second Chancellor of the University of Derby from 2003 to 2008. He was the first chair of the Higher Education Academy.

Wagner has been prominent in the British Jewish community, being a Trustee of The Jewish Chronicle, a member of the Chief Rabbinate Trust and chair of the Commission on Jewish Schools. He was rated number 60 in a list of the most influential Jews in the UK.

He was appointed a CBE in 2000 for services to higher education and the Jewish community.

Academic offices
Preceded by Sir Christopher Ball	Chancellor of the University of Derby; 2003 - 2008	Succeeded by Peregrine Cavendish, 12th Duke of Devonshire
