= Piers Bengough =

Colonel Sir Piers Henry George Bengough KCVO OBE DL (24 May 1929 – 18 April 2005) was Her Majesty's Representative at Ascot, in the Royal Household, from 1984 to 1997.

He was educated at Eton College and served in The Royal Hussars from 1948 to 1973, retiring as a Lieutenant-Colonel (promoted to Colonel in 1984). He was Honorary Colonel from 1983 to 1990, and was a member of the Honourable Corps of Gentlemen at Arms from 1981 until his retirement in 1999. He died in 2005.

He was appointed an OBE in 1973 and a KCVO in 1986. He was made a Deputy Lieutenant for the county of Hereford and Worcester on 29 June 1987. Bengough was named High Sheriff of Herefordshire for 2002.

He joined the Grand Military Race Committee in 1963 and was appointed Chairman in 1985 on the retirement of General Sir Cecil Blacker. He stepped down as Chairman in 2004, being replaced by Brigadier Andrew Parker Bowles.

Bengough married former figure skater Bridget Adams in 1952.

Court offices
Preceded by The Marquess of Abergavenny	His Majesty's Representative at Ascot; 1984–1997	Succeeded by The Marquess of Hartington
Honorary titles
Preceded by Andrew Perrins	High Sheriff of Herefordshire; 2002	Succeeded by Georgina Britten-Long
