= St Leonards Pier =

Public pleasure pier

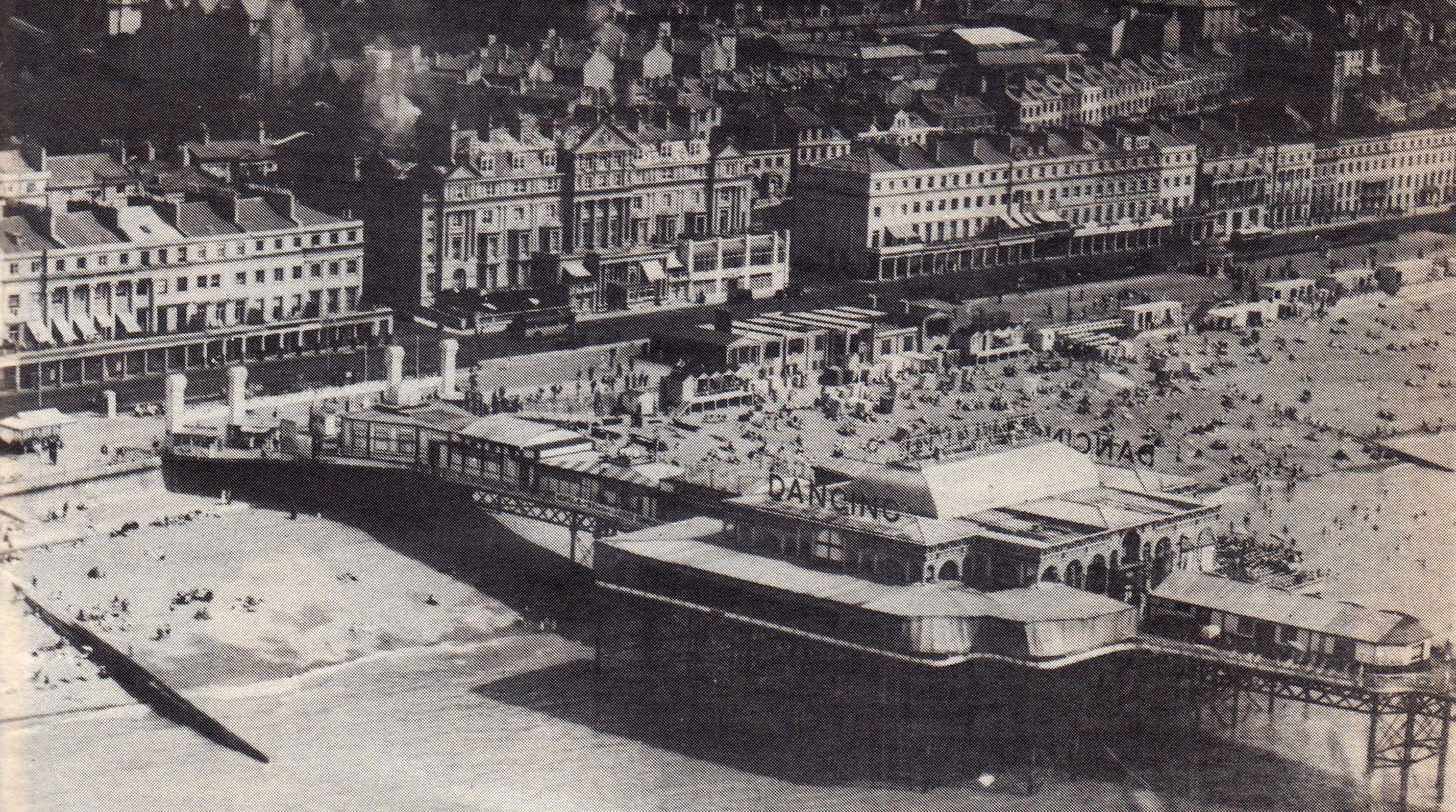
- 1930s aerial view
- Type: Pleasure Pier
- Coordinates: 50.8510159°N 0.551912°E
- Official name: Palace Pier
- Owner: St Leonards Pier Company (1888–1917); John Henry Gardner (1917–1933); David and Philip Lannon(1933–1951)
- Operator: American Syndicate (1909–1917); Southern Piers Ltd (1933–1945)

Characteristics
- Total length: 950 ft (290 m)

History
- Designer: R St George-Moore; F H Humphries (north pavilion)
- Construction start: 1888
- Completion date: 1891
- Opening date: 28 October 1891
- Closure date: September 1939
- Demolition date: 1951-1953
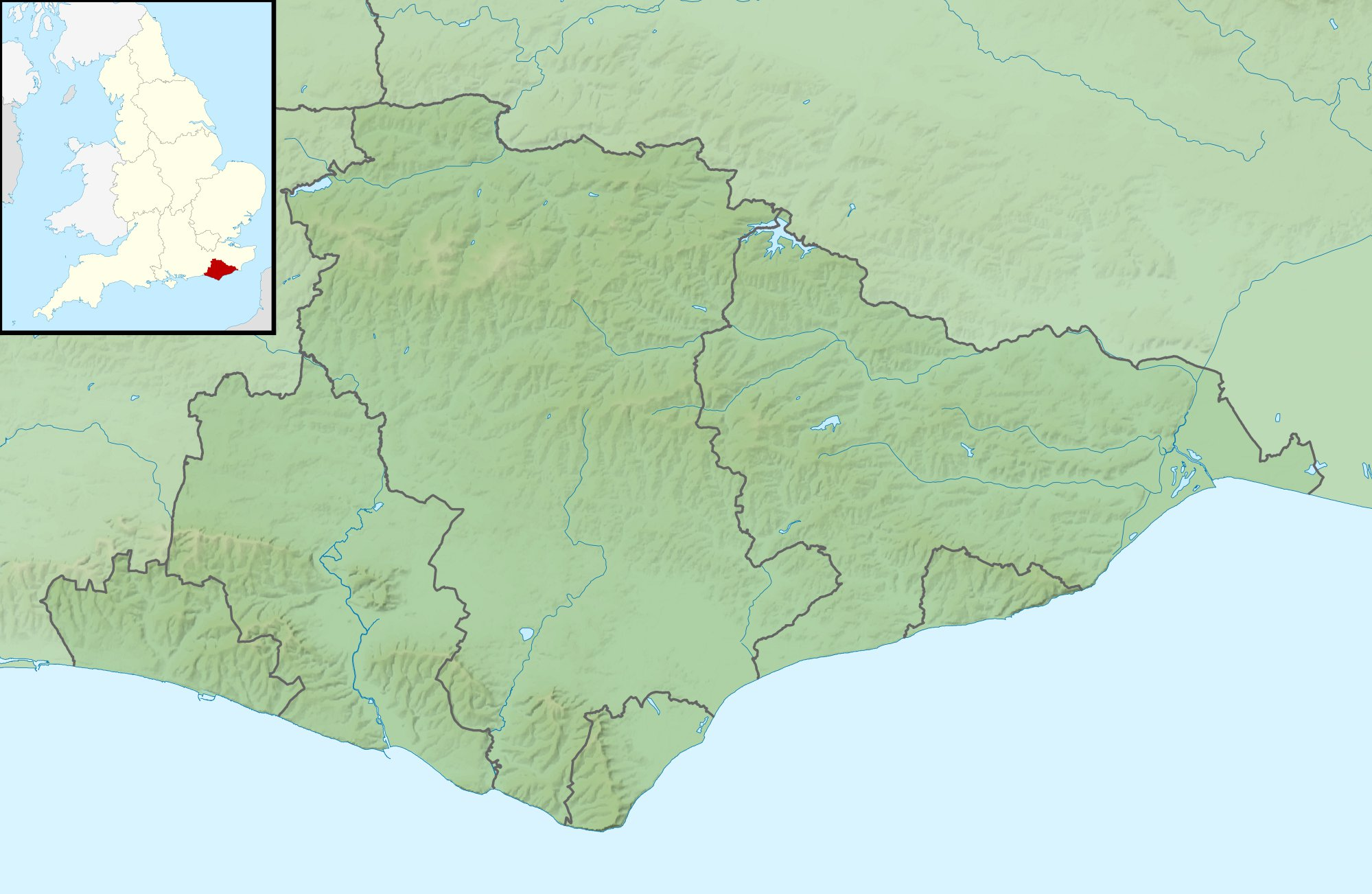
- Location in East Sussex
- Location in East Sussex

St Leonards Pier, also known as the Palace Pier, was a public pleasure pier in St Leonards-on-Sea, part of the town and borough of Hastings in East Sussex, England. Opened in 1891 the pier was a direct rival to nearby Hastings Pier, and during its heyday the pier was a leading tourist attraction, and was described in the 1894 Baedeker travel guide as handsome. The pier was damaged during WW2 and left derelict after the war until purchased by Hastings Corporation in 1951 who demolished the structure over the next two years.

== History ==
The first plans to build a pier at St Leonards were started in mid-1872, just before the nearby Hastings Pier was opened. (Hastings and St Leonards were separate towns at the time) The St Leonards-on-Sea Pier Company was set up and permissions obtained from Parliament in the St. Leonards-on-Sea Pier Order 1870 to build a 600 ft (180 m) long pier 100 yd (91 m) east of the Royal Victoria Hotel. The pier was to have been built by a Middlesbrough company at a cost of £15,000. Consent was required from the St Leonards Improvement Commissioners, who owned the promenade, and this was refused. The commissioner who proposed the refusal, Rev J. W. Tottenham, was also a shareholder in the Hastings Pier Company.

Seeing the success of Hastings Pier, plans were again drawn up for a pier at St Leonards in 1886, led by owner of the Royal Victoria Hotel, Richard Reed, and local solicitor Williams Carless, located 100 yd (91 m) west of the hotel. Permission from Parliament was obtained under the General Pier and Harbours Act 1861. Design work and raising of finance was started in early 1877.

=== Design ===
The pier was designed by Richard St George-Moore, would later design the Brighton and Swanage and Tenby piers. The 960 ft (290 m) long design used steel piled columns and girders. Unlike most piers, the main pavilion was located near the landward (north) end so entertainment was less likely to be interrupted by adverse weather and horse-drawn carriages could drop patrons off directly at the pavilion. There was a large open area at the seaward end to provide for further expansion of the facilities at a later date and a small landing stage.

The main pavilion was designed by local architect Frank Humphries in a semi-Moorish style and could seat 750 people.

=== Construction ===
Construction began on 1 March 1888, with the local mayoress, Mrs William Stubbs, present when the first pile was screwed into the ground. Financial problems delayed construction which were resolved with a low-cost loan of £7,000 from the South Eastern Railway Company who had recently opened West St Leonards Station and hoped the pier would increase passengers to the station. The mayoress inserted the last of 22,500 bolts holding the framework together on 9 October 1890.

The pier was built by Head, Wrightson and Co of Stockton on Tees using 1,500 tons of iron which was brought in by sea. It cost £30,000 to build.

=== Early years ===
The pier was opened on 28 October 1891 by Lord and Lady Brassey, who greeted the public whilst the pipers of the Gordons Boys Home played. Unfortunately, due to gale force winds, the seaward end was closed to the public.

During a gale in october 1898, the landing stage, which had had little use apart from the odd steamer, was washed away. Another gale destroyed the pier's west toll house in February 1899.

The first showing of moving pictures in the area was on the pier on 7 November 1896.

The pier is visible in the film It's a Bet (1935), starring Gene Gerrard.

In 1904 the pavilion became a fashionable lounge called the Kursaal.

=== American Syndicate ===
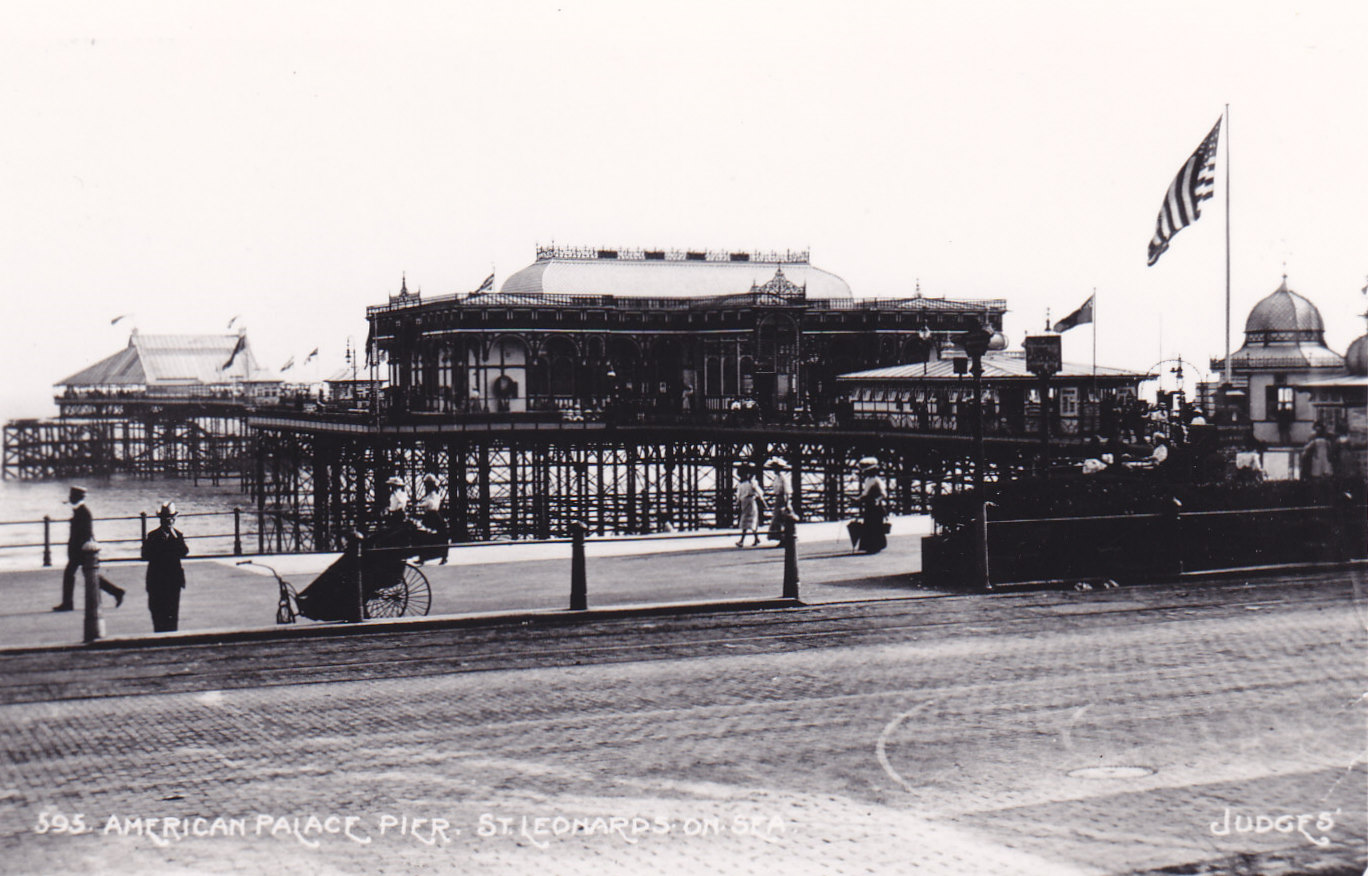
St Leonards Pier viewed from the promenade

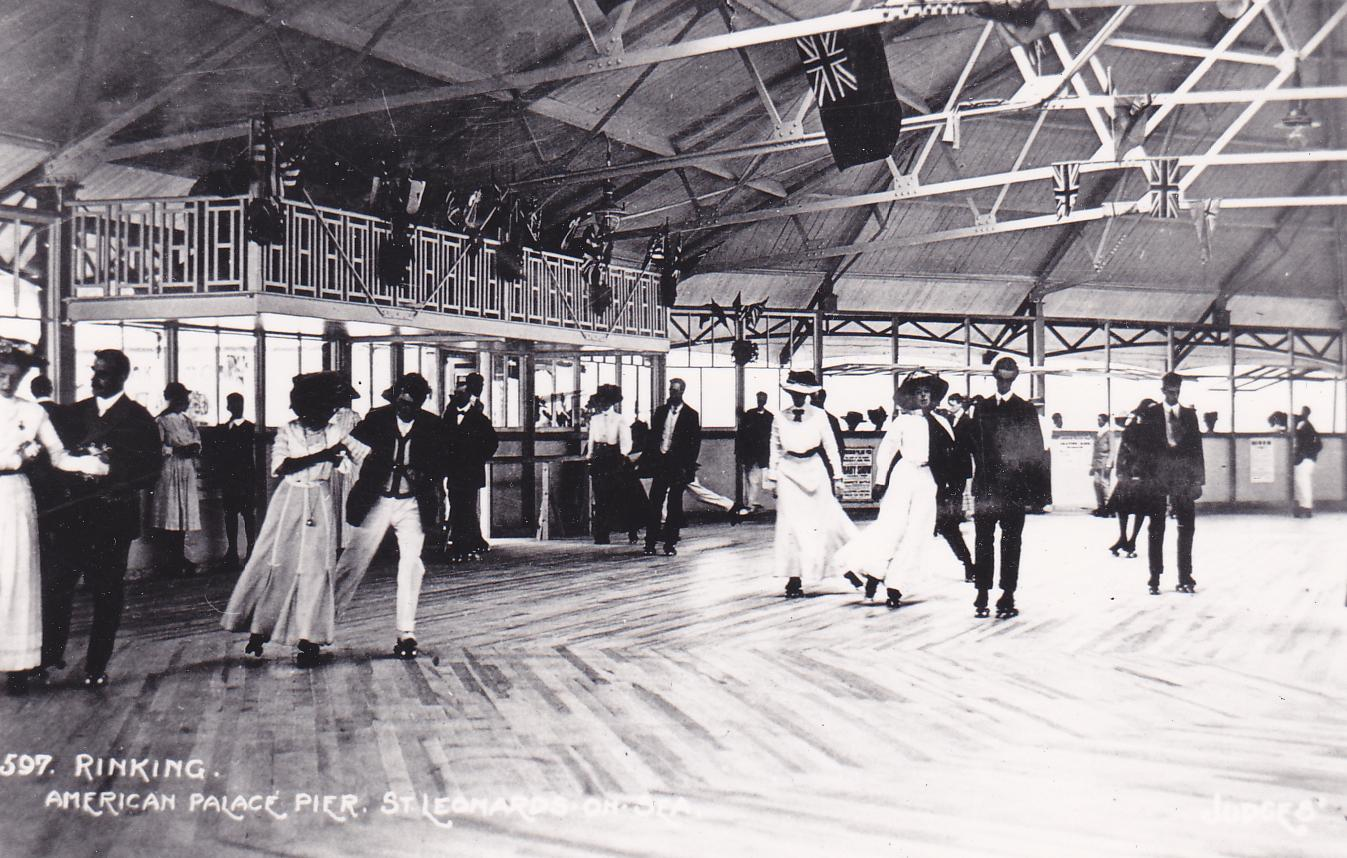
Skating rink on St Leonards pier

On 1 April 1909 an 'American Syndicate' took a lease of the pier. They carried out many improvements and the pier was reopened as the American Palace Pier on 23 May 1909. Six ornamental kiosks were erected and a second pavilion was built at the seaward end of the pier in July 1909 for use as a roller skating rink. The pavilion had a steel frame with the upper parts of the walls opening glass and the flooring was maple.

Angling was popular on the pier and the Hastings and St Leonards Angling Association used the pier as their base. Fishing competitions were frequently held.

=== John Gardner ===
John Henry Gardner purchased the pier in August 1917. He became well known locally for his support for local charities and efforts to make the pier a success.

The music on the pier was well received, in his column for The Westminster Gazette (7 April 1923), Aldous Huxley surmised that during the winter months more good orchestral music could be heard on St Leonards pier than in the West End.

Although popular, the pier wasn't a financial success. Almost bankrupt, Gardner offered the pier to Hastings Corporation for £9,000 in 1927. The Corporation declined on the grounds that refurbishment of the pier was needed at an estimated cost of £21,000. In 1933 the debenture holders put their shares up for sale.

=== Lannon Brothers ===
In 1933 the pier was purchased by two brothers from London, David and Philip Lannon. Major changes were made and the pier reopened as the New Palace Pier in March 1934 with a new Art Deco frontage.

To accommodate tourists, well known bands were hired, a bridge congress was held and wrestling was staged. The pier hosted Chipperfields Wonder Zoo in 1935, which claimed to be ‘the greatest collection of wild and rare animals, birds and reptiles ever seen on the South Coast’.

The Lannon Brothers tried to sell the pier in late 1938 at an auction in London. The highest bid was £34,750, which was below the reserve price.

44,000 people visited the pier over the 1939 August Bank Holiday, just before the outbreak of World War II.

=== WW2 ===
The pier was requisition by the military in September 1939 and the centre section removed to prevent its use in the case of an enemy invasion.

The structure suffered damage during a bombing raid in October 1940, and was further damaged by a gale in February 1943. Further damage was caused by a fire in March 1944. Canadian soldiers were blamed after it was rumoured that one of the soldiers had lit a flare which drifted onto the pier.

=== Demolition ===
After the end of the war the owners made no attempt to repair the pier. Hastings Corporation purchased the pier from the Lannon Brothers in January 1951 for £1,000 and began demolishing it in February that year. The structure was further damaged by a gale on 13 March with the seward end collapsing into the sea. Most of the demolition was completed in mid-1952. Some piles remained, which were removed in the summer of 1953 using explosives by the Royal Engineers of the Territorial Army.

In August 1979 shingle movement exposed 4 piles from the pier. These were removed by Hastings Council as they were a hazard.

== Legacy ==
In October 2017 Hastings Mayor, Judy Rogers, and local historian Steve Peak unveiled an information plate on the promenade to mark the site of the pier.
