= Laura Cavendish, Countess of Burlington =

British countess and fashion consultant

Countess of Burlington
- Born: Laura Roundell; 1972 (age 53–54)
- Occupation: Fashion consultant
- Spouses: Orlando Montagu (m. 1996; div. 2002) William Cavendish, Earl of Burlington (m. 2007)
- Children: 3

Laura Cavendish, Countess of Burlington (née Roundell, formerly Montagu; born 1972) is a British fashion consultant. She is the daughter of Richard Roundell, deputy chairman of Christie's, and his wife, Anthea, both of Dorfold Hall, a Jacobean house in Cheshire.

A contributing editor for British Vogue, she has been on the New Generation board of the British Fashion Council since 2010 and has consulted for a number of brands including Selfridges and Acne. In 2017 she led the "House Style" exhibition at Chatsworth curated by Hamish Bowles and designed by Patrick Kinmonth and co-wrote a book by the same name.

== Marriages and children ==
She married firstly, in August 1996 at St Mary's Church, Acton, the Hon. Orlando William Montagu (born 16 January 1971), the younger son of the 11th Earl of Sandwich. They had no children before divorcing in 2002.

Her engagement to the aristocratic photographer William Cavendish, Earl of Burlington (born 6 June 1969), heir to the Duke of Devonshire, was announced on 23 December 2006 in The Times. The couple married in March 2007, and a wedding reception was held in August 2007 at Lismore Castle, County Waterford, Ireland.

She is now known as the Countess of Burlington, or more informally as Laura Burlington.

The couple has three children, a son and two daughters:

- Lady Maud Cavendish (born 2009)
- James Cavendish, Lord Cavendish (born 2010), second in line of succession to the dukedom of Devonshire
- Lady Elinor Cavendish (born 2013)

Their main home is at Bolton Abbey which Lady Burlington has refurbished.

== Titles ==
- 1972–1996: Miss Laura Roundell
- 1996–2002: The Hon. Mrs Orlando Montagu
- 2002–2007: Mrs Laura Montagu
- 2007–present: Countess of Burlington
