= Patricia Nevill, Marchioness of Abergavenny =

The Most Honourable The Marchioness of Abergavenny DCVO
- Born: Mary Patricia Harrison; 20 October 1915
- Died: 22 February 2005 (aged 89)
- Occupation: Lady of the Bedchamber to Elizabeth II
- Spouse: John Nevill, 5th Marquess of Abergavenny (m. 1938; died 2000)
- Children: Lady Anne Whiteley; Lady Vivienne Lillingston; Lady Jane Nevill; Henry Nevill, Earl of Lewes; Lady Rose Clowes
- Parents: John Harrison; Hon. Margery Levy-Lawson

Mary Patricia Nevill, Marchioness of Abergavenny DCVO (20 October 1915 – 22 February 2005) was a friend and Lady of the Bedchamber to Elizabeth II.

== Life ==
She was born Mary Patricia Harrison, the daughter of John Harrison of King’s Walden, and his wife, Hon. Margaret Harrison, a daughter of William Levy-Lawson, 3rd Baron Burnham.

On 4 January 1938, she married the John Nevill, Earl of Lewes, who inherited his father's title of Marquess of Abergavenny in 1954, whereupon Patricia became Marchioness of Abergavenny. They had five children:

- Lady Anne Patricia Nevill (b. 25 October 1938), married Captain Martin Whiteley and had issue.
- Lady Vivienne Margaret Nevill (15 February 1941 – 10 September 2018), married Alan Lillingston and had issue.
- Lady Jane Elizabeth Nevill (1944–1946), died in infancy.
- Henry John Montague Nevill, Earl of Lewes (1948–1965), educated at Eton, died without issue.
- Lady Rose Nevill (b. 15 July 1950); a bridesmaid at the wedding of Princess Margaret and Antony Armstrong-Jones. Lady Rose married George Clowes and had issue.

In 1960 it was suggested to her father (who lived at King's Walden and was a neighbour to the Strathmores' home of St. Paul's Walden Bury) that she become an Extra Lady of the Bedchamber to the Queen; and she held this position from 1960 to 1966. She then became a full Lady of the Bedchamber from 1966 until her retirement in 1987, when she reverted to an Extra Lady until her death.

== Death ==
The Marchioness of Abergavenny died on 22 February 2005, aged 89.

== Honours ==
In 1970, Lady Abergavenny was appointed CVO and in the 1981 Birthday Honours promoted to DCVO. In 1969, she received the Grand Decoration in Gold with Star for Services to the Republic of Austria.

Country	Date	Appointment	Ribbon	Post-nominal letters	Notes
United Kingdom	1970	Commander of the Royal Victorian Order		CVO	Promoted to DCVO in 1981
United Kingdom	13 June 1981	Dame Commander of the Royal Victorian Order		DCVO	
United Kingdom	6 February 1977	Queen Elizabeth II Silver Jubilee Medal			
United Kingdom	6 February 2002	Queen Elizabeth II Golden Jubilee Medal			
Austria		Grand Decoration of Honour in Gold with Star for Services to the Republic of Austria			
