= University of Derby =

University in Derby, England

- Coat of arms
- Former names: Derby College, Derby College of Art and Technology, Derby Lonsdale College of Higher Education, Derbyshire College of Higher Education
- Motto: Latin: Experientia docet
- Motto in English: Experience is the best teacher
- Type: Public
- Established: 1851 – Teacher Training College; 1992 – gained university status
- Affiliations: ACU; EMUA; EQUIS; ERASMUS; Florence Nightingale Foundation; Universities UK; University Alliance
- Chancellor: William Cavendish, Earl of Burlington
- Vice-Chancellor: Kathryn Mitchell
- Chairman of Council: Chris Hughes
- Students: 18,895 HE (2024/25)
- Undergraduates: 14,475 (2024/25)
- Postgraduates: 4,420 (2024/25)
- Other students: 4,650 FE
- Location: Derby, England, UK; 52°56′20″N 1°29′47″W
- Campus: Urban
- Colours: Black and gold
- Website: derby.ac.uk

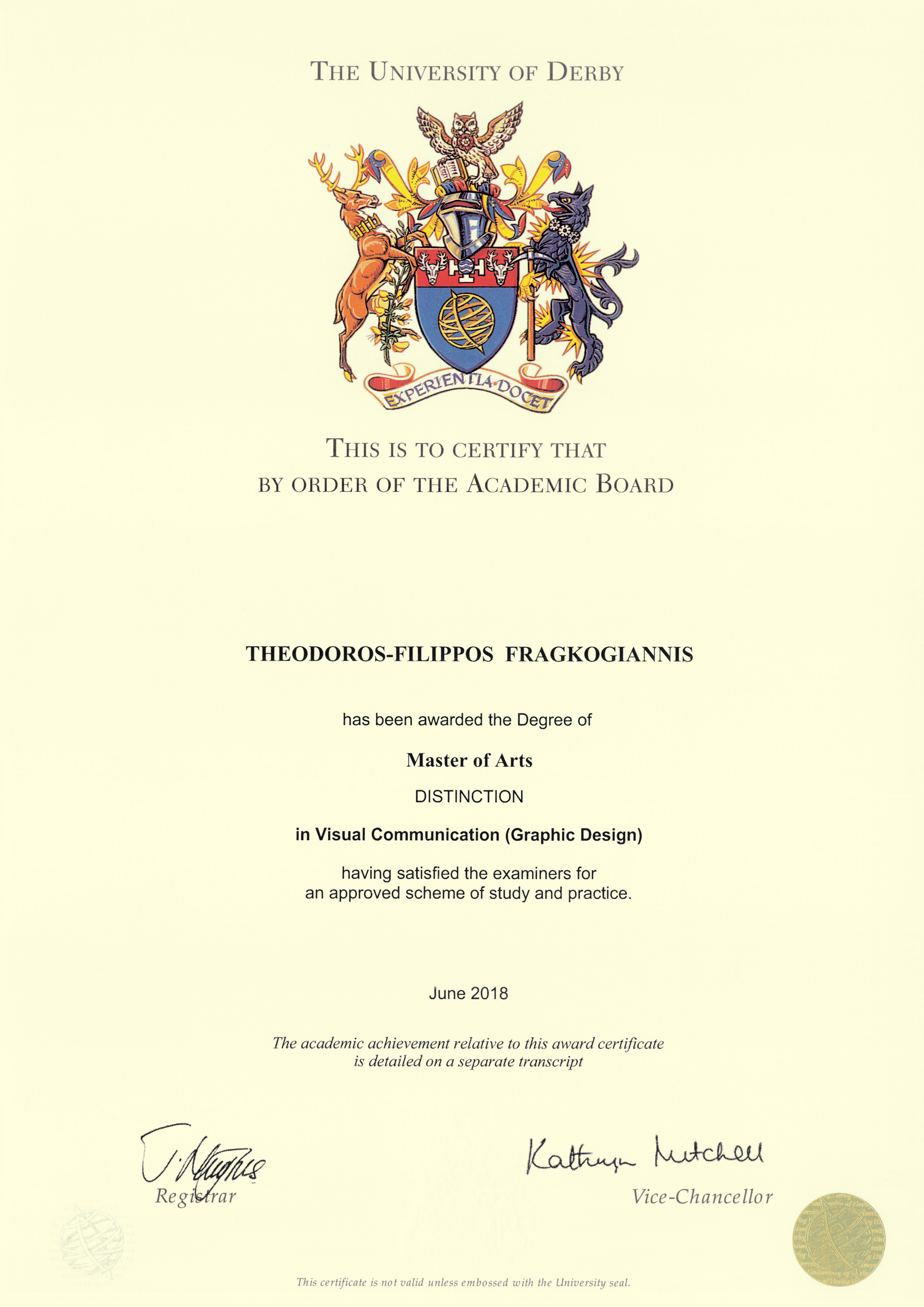
Master of Arts in Visual communication (Graphic design) conferred by the University of Derby in 2018

The University of Derby, formerly known as Derby College, is a public university in the city of Derby, England. It traces its history back to the establishment of the Derby Diocesan Institution for the training of schoolmistresses in 1851. It gained university status in 1992.

The university provides over 300 study programmes at undergraduate level. Undergraduate programmes as well as short courses, foundation degrees and postgraduate degrees cover most academic disciplines and sub-disciplines. Currently, the university is home to around 34,000 students in all areas of study.

== History ==
=== Nineteenth century ===
Over the years, two dozen bodies have contributed to the university's formation. The first of these was founded in 1856 as the Derby Diocesan Institution for the Training of Schoolmistresses. Albeit under different names to reflect maturing objectives, the institution flourished as an individual entity for some 120 years before merging with another developing educational artery to help form what was then known as the Derby Lonsdale College of Higher Education, 1977.

The other line of this confluence began in 1853 with the establishment of the Derby School of Art, which in 1870 became the Derby Central School of Art and the Derby Central School of Science. In 1885, the two schools were reformulated into the Derby School of Art and Technical Institution. Less than a decade later, however, in 1892, three more mergers took place and the institution became the Derby Municipal Technical College.

=== Early twentieth century ===
In 1928, the Technical College split into the Derby School of Art and the Derby Technical College. By 1955, the two had become the Derby and District College of Art (opened on 22 September 1966 by Paul Reilly, Director of the Council of Industrial Design), and the Derby and District College of Technology (opened by Prince Philip, Duke of Edinburgh on 15 May 1964), both situated on Kedleston Road, Allestree. The site was formerly Markeaton Golf Course and cost £2.5m, with a foundation stone placed on 5 July 1957 by Lord (Ernest) Hives, a former managing director of Rolls-Royce. Opened by the Duke the day before, the 35-acre (14 ha) Bishop Lonsdale College in Mickleover was developed for teacher training courses.

At the opening ceremony, the duke said "qualities needed by teachers are the dedication of a saint, the patience of a watchmaker, the sympathy of parents, and the leadership of a general". The Duke spent two days in Derby, staying the night nearby at Okeover Hall near Ashbourne as a guest of the Lord Lieutenant of Derbyshire. Half of the places at Mickleover were reserved for C of E trainees and the other half for those with no link to Derby Diocese.

=== 1970–1992: Mergers of higher education colleges in Derbyshire ===
The operational split between the two colleges at Kedleston Road was dissolved in 1972 with a mutual initiative for the creation of the Derby College of Art and Technology. Five years afterwards, and as previously noted, the described educational lineage married itself with Derby's diocesan tradition, which had become known institutionally as the Bishop Lonsdale College of Education at Mickleover. There were about 800 students at Mickleover and 1,200 at Kedleston Road.

After the 1977 union and subsequent formation of the Derby Lonsdale College of Higher Education, four other educational institutions would add their respective sector-related talents. In March 1981, the college held its first graduation ceremony with formal academic caps and gowns with only six degrees (out of 156 courses) being ratified by the CNAA. Previous to this, the college's degrees were awarded in a ceremony at the University of Nottingham.

The Matlock College of Education, a traditional local education authority teacher training college formed in 1946 at Rockside Hall (now a country hotel), combined with Lonsdale in 1983 to create the Derbyshire College of Higher Education, when the Matlock College was having financial difficulties when funding for teacher training was scaled down when school numbers had dropped. In 1985, this college at Matlock was scaled down significantly and closed in 1986. In 1991 the Southern Derbyshire School of Occupational Therapy united with the college. The Southern Derbyshire School of Radiography did the same in 1992.

=== 1992–1997: Achievement of university status ===
In 1992 the Further and Higher Education Act 1992 allowed the Derbyshire College of Higher Education to become the only school of higher education in the country to be upgraded directly to a university. On 31 October 1992, the T block (science subjects, which lies to the north of the North Tower) was opened by Princess Alice.

In January 1994, Britannia Mill (a renovated mill) opened, at a cost of £10M. On 4 March 1994, the B block (business and management subjects, which lies north of the East Tower) was opened by the Conservative MP, Tim Boswell.

Later in the autumn of 1994, the Atrium was built. In November 1997, the Learning Centre (now renamed 'University Library') was officially opened, having been built on a former car park. The University of Derby was fully invested.

=== 1998–present: New campuses and further mergers ===
In 1998, the university merged with High Peak College of Further Education in Buxton, which is in the North West of the County of Derbyshire. High Peak College was at that time based at premises in Harpur Hill, but moved to the Devonshire Dome in the centre of Buxton in 2005.

In August 2012, the university merged with Leek College in Leek, Staffordshire. In 2013 the university merged all of its further education education provision into Buxton & Leek College. The college operates at the university's campuses in Buxton, Leek, and Kedleston Road in Derby.

In October 2016, the university opened a new site in Chesterfield in the North-East of the County of Derbyshire. This is situated in the buildings of what was originally St Helena's Grammar School, which were converted by the university.

In 2021, the university withdrew its Higher Education provision from the Buxton campus leaving just Buxton and Leek Colleges operating in Buxton.

In 2022, the university opened the Nuclear Skills Academy in partnership with Rolls Royce Submarines Ltd. with the intention of 200 new apprentices being trained for the next 10 years.

In October 2025, the university announced that it was considering making 265 members of staff redundant to ease financial pressures. Members of the University of Derby branch of the University and College Union (UCU) voted to strike for three days in December 2025 in an effort to halt the redundancy proposals.

== Campuses and facilities ==
The university has a range of resources and facilities available to all students and staff, including lecture theatres; Union of Students' facilities; a bus service operating at and between the campuses; Chaplaincy and facilities for faith, meditation and prayer; indoor and outdoor sports facilities; cafes and food outlets; wellbeing centres and support; Careers and Employability services and centres; and a University Library service

=== Derby ===
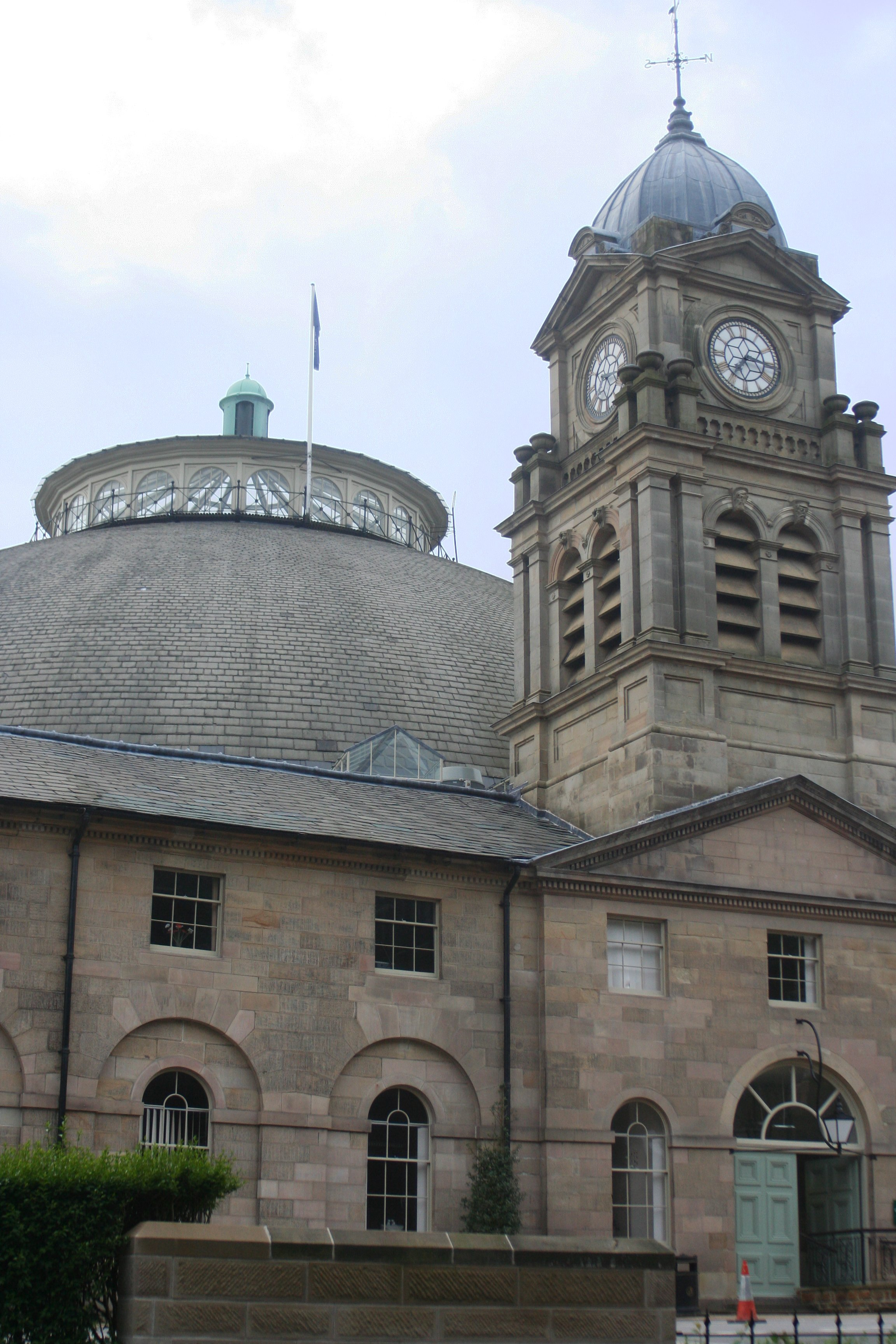
The Devonshire Dome in Buxton

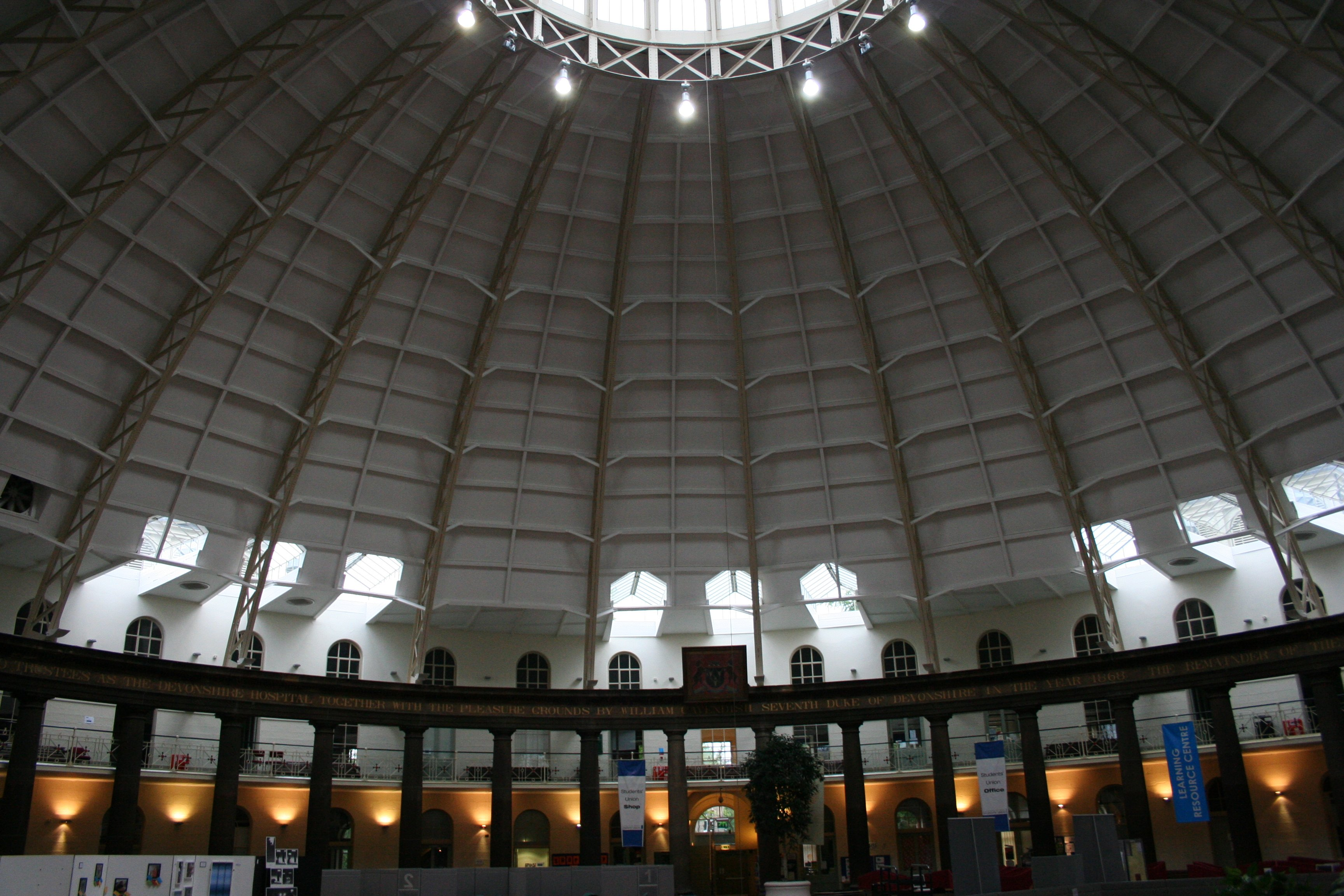
Inside the Devonshire Dome

The university's main campus is in the city of Derby. The Kedleston Road site in Allestree, in the north-west of Derby, is the largest and main campus and serves as the university's headquarters. It is situated close to the A38 and opposite Markeaton Park. A contemporary-styled building for Arts, Design, and Media, as well as a STEM building, on Markeaton Street in Derby, was formally opened in early November 2007 by Richard Branson. Courses are also run at the Britannia Mill site in Derby.

In addition, the university also owns Derby Theatre in Derby city centre where courses in Theatre Arts are delivered. Derby Law School and the Department of Law, Criminology and Social Sciences operate at the One Friar Gate Square building in the centre of Derby

The Derby Campus also has a variety of specialist facilities, including computing laboratories, two computer games development suites, a doctor's surgery, conference facilities, multi-functional lecture theatres, art and culture venues, concert venues, recording studios, sports centre and fitness suites, outdoor pitches, student union facilities, and a multi-faith centre.

=== Buxton ===
This campus was located in the Grade II* listed 18th-century former stable block, the Devonshire Dome. In 1854, the 6th Duke of Devonshire donated the land, part of his stables, and some of the funds for conversion to a hospital and gardens for charity patients seeking treatment at the baths in Buxton. His architect, Henry Currey, directed the work. The ironwork dome (1881, once the world's largest, with a diameter of 44.2 metres (145 ft)), a clocktower (1882), and a surgical ward (1897) were built as expansions to the hospital, which was run by the NHS after 1948. The University of Derby purchased the then-derelict hospital from the NHS in 2001, and moved operations here from the Harpur Hill campus in 2005. The Devonshire Dome building dominates the local landscape and has a dome which is over 145 ft (44 m) in diameter, bigger than that of St Paul's Cathedral in London. It was formally opened as a University Campus by Prince Charles in February 2006.

The university formally withdrew its Higher Education provision from the Buxton campus in 2021 and moved all courses to the Derby Campus with culinary arts, spa management, and outdoor leadership courses terminated. 2021 also saw the permanent closure of its student accommodation, High Peak Halls, in Buxton due to the aforementioned move. The Buxton campus therefore now only operates as a college and not a university campus.

=== Chesterfield ===
The university's teaching site in Chesterfield is situated in the buildings of what was originally St Helena's Grammar School, off Sheffield Road, near Chesterfield town centre. The buildings were extensively renovated by the university between 2014 and 2016, after being acquired by the University of Derby in 2014.

The new teaching site opened in October 2016 to be a delivery site for the College of Health, Psychology, and Social Care, including their nationally recognised Adult Nursing degrees and Mentoring in Practice courses, replacing existing premises in the Chesterfield Chamber of Commerce building. These courses are accredited by the Nursing and Midwifery Council. They continue the university's training work in collaboration with Chesterfield Royal Hospital, and the building features a mock ward and 'clinical skills suite' with simulated patients to provide real-world experience for undergraduates.

=== Leek ===
The Leek campus is a delivery site for Buxton & Leek College. The campus mainly runs Further and Adult Education courses, but also runs some degree programmes validated by the University of Derby.

=== International partnerships ===
The university does not have any campuses abroad but instead partners with institutions around the world, which deliver and award University of Derby degrees.

Current international collaborations include Botswana Accountancy College, Vakalo Art & Design College, Mediterranean College, Raffles Design Institute, Swiss Hotel Management School, Culinary Arts Academy Switzerland and Help Academy.

== Coat of Arms ==
Coat of arms of University of Derby
Crest Upon a Helm with a Wreath Or Bleu-Céleste and Gules an Owl wings expanded proper gorged with a Chain Or pendent therefrom a Tudor Rose barbed and seeded proper and resting the dexter claw on an open Book also proper edged and bound Or. Mantled Bleu-Céleste and Gules doubled Or. Escutcheon Bleu-Céleste an Orrery Or on a Chief Gules a Cross potent quadrate Argent charged with a Fountain between two Stag's Heads caboshed of the fourth. Supporters On the Dexter a Buck proper armed, unguled and gorged with a collar of Park Palings Or and supporting a sprig of Broom proper and on the Sinister side a Male Griffin rampant Sable armed and irradiated Or langued Gules gorged with a collar of cogwheels Argent and supporting a miner's pick, head upwards proper. Motto 'Experientia Docet'

== Organisation and governance ==
=== Chancellors ===
The current Chancellor of the University of Derby is William Cavendish, Earl of Burlington, who was installed in a ceremony at the Buxton Campus on 15 March 2018. The Earl works professionally as a photographer under the name Bill Cavendish. He is the son and heir of the previous Chancellor, Peregrine Cavendish, 12th Duke of Devonshire.

Previous Chancellors of the university:

- Peregrine Cavendish, 12th Duke of Devonshire 2008 – 2018
- Professor Leslie Wagner 2003 – 2008
- Sir Christopher Ball 1995 – 2003

=== Structure ===
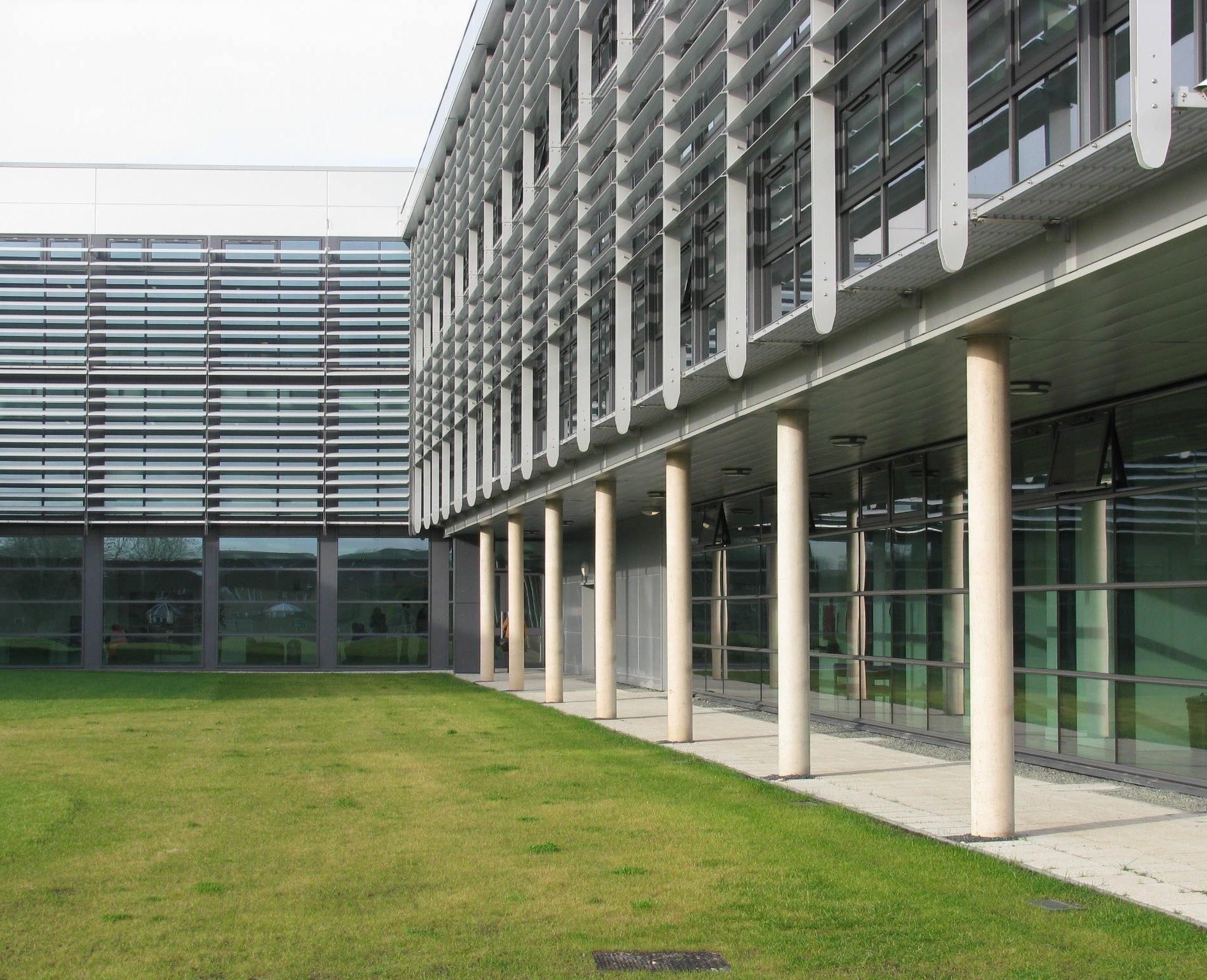
Markeaton Street, Inner Lawn Detail

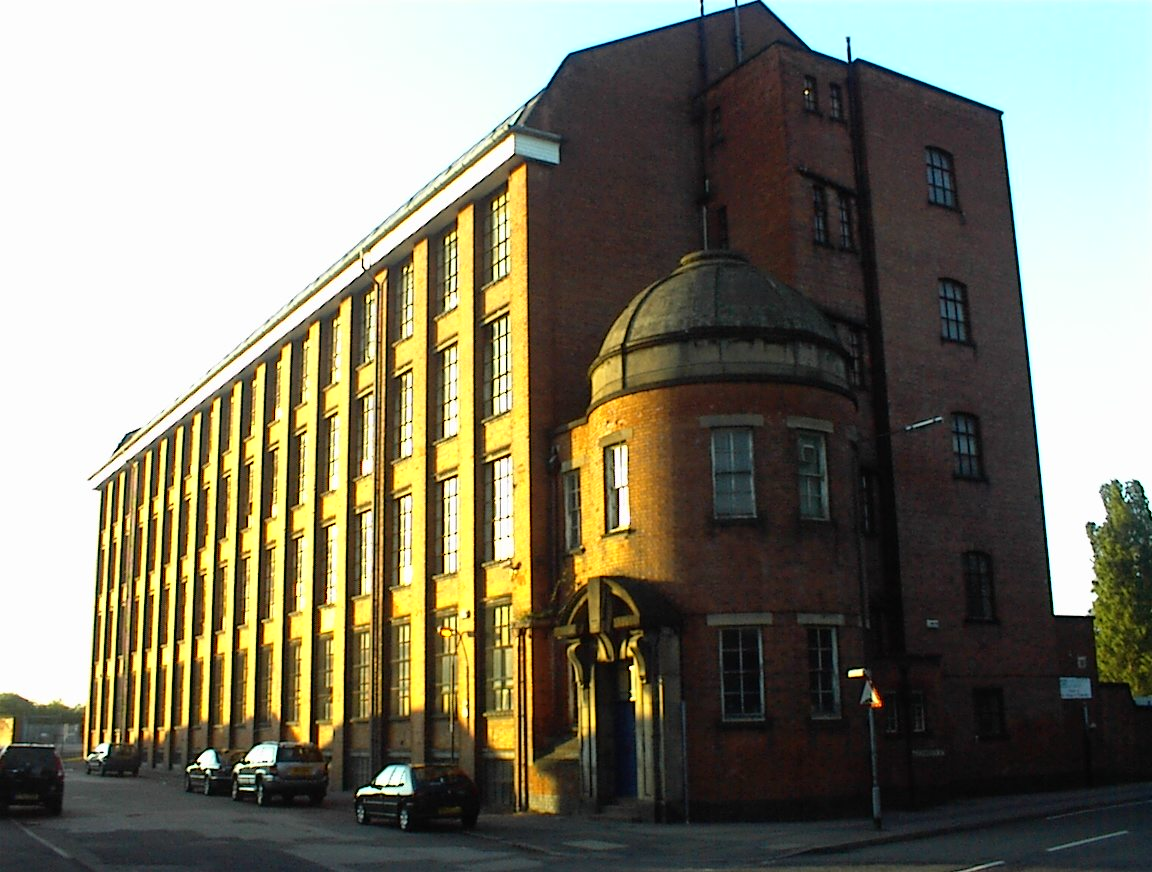
Britannia Mill, Mackworth Road

College of Arts, Humanities and Education

- School of Arts
- School of Humanities and Journalism
- Institute of Education

College of Science and Engineering

- School of Computing and Engineering
- School of Built and Natural Environment
- School of Human Sciences

College of Business, Law and Social Sciences

- Derby Business School
- School of Law and Social Sciences

College of Health, Psychology and Social Care

- School of Allied Health and Social Care
- School of Nursing and Midwifery
- School of Psychology

=== Derby Law School ===
Notable research holdings include the private papers of Sir Gerald Fitzmaurice. The school provides considerable support for pro bono legal work in the community.

== Academic profile ==
Rankings
National rankings
- Complete (2027): 71
- Guardian (2027): 33
- Times / Sunday Times (2027): 96

Global rankings
- QS (2027): 1201–1400
- THE (2026): 601–800

== Student life ==
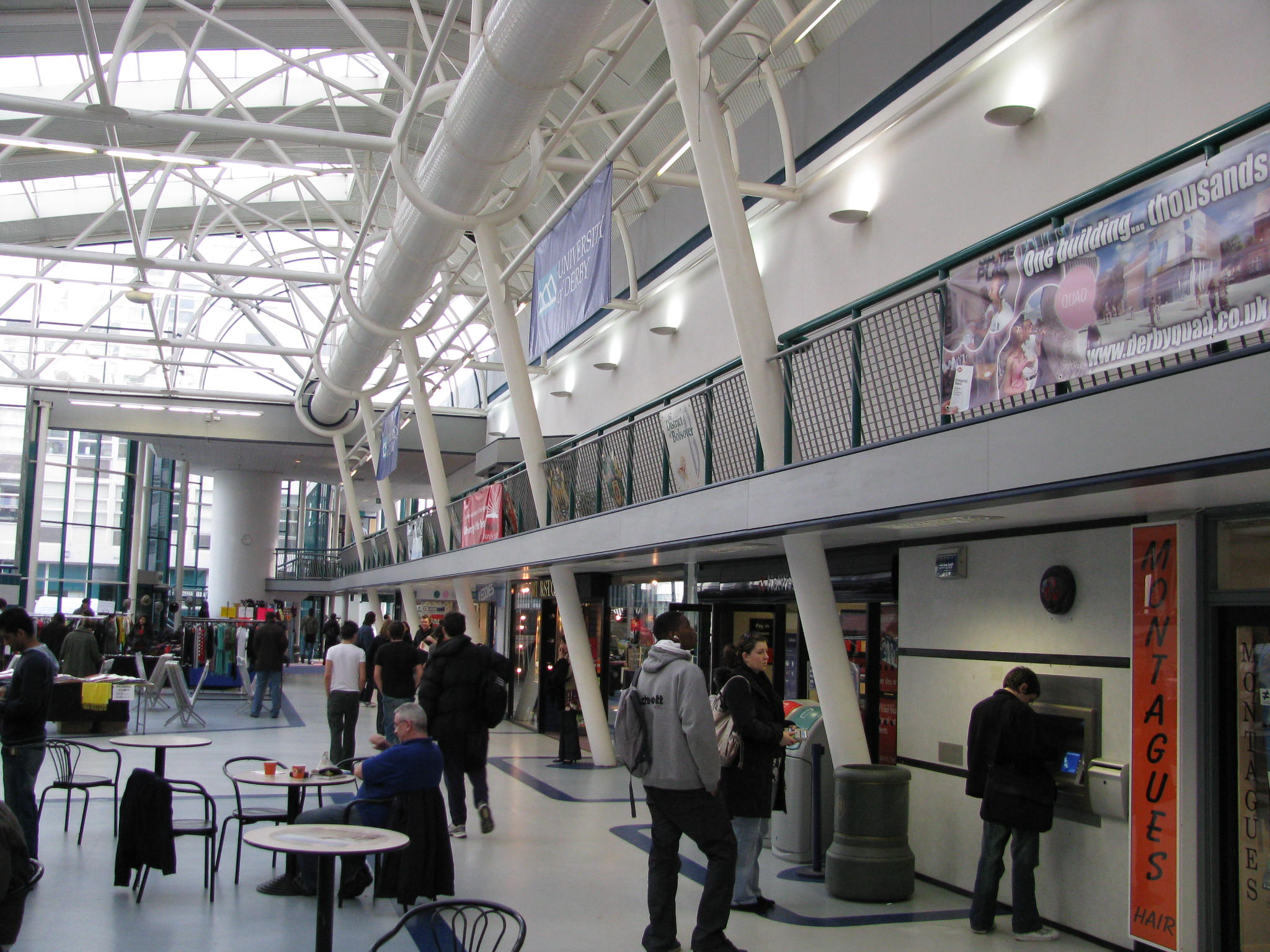
The Atrium, Kedleston Road

The Atrium, built in 1994, is a large concourse at the Kedleston Road site. The Atrium is used regularly for university, student union, and private events.

The Union of Students also provides social space and catering facilities for students. These include a new Basecamp social space, which opened in 2022.

=== Students' Union ===
The Union of Students is the students union at the University of Derby and is based within the Students' Union Quarter at the Kedleston Road site. The Union of Students completed a rebrand for the start of 2017 – 2018 academic year and was previously known as UDSU – University of Derby Students' Union.

=== Residences ===
The residences for Derby students are based in the University Quarter between the Kedleston Road, Markeaton Street, and Britannia Mill sites and the centre of Derby. They are:

- Agard Court on Agard Street
- Nunnery Court on Nuns Street
- Princess Alice Court on Bridge Street
- St Christopher's Court on Ashbourne Road
- Peak Court, with entrances on Lodge Lane and Bridge Street
- Flamsteed Court on Kedleston Old Road
- Darley Bank on Brook Street

Sir Peter Hilton Court was closed to residents in 2021.

Buxton students formerly had one hall of residence, High Peak Halls which closed in 2021.

It formerly owned halls of residence on Lonsdale Place and Peet Street. The latter was controversially sold to G4S, becoming an asylum seeker reception centre.

== Notable alumni ==
- Stephen Amoah, Ghanaian politician
- Paul Cummins, English artist (Blood Swept Lands and Seas of Red)
- Graham Joyce, British fiction author
- Khumbo Kachali, Malawian politician and former vice-president of Malawi
- Idris Khan, British artist and photographer
- David Imms, English painter
- Devon Malcolm, English cricketer
- May Marsden, Australian artist and lecturer trained at the Derby Central School of Art before she emigrated in 1913.
- Lucy Spraggan, English singer-songwriter
- Carl Tighe, British academic in creative writing

== See also ==
- Armorial of UK universities
- College of Education
- List of universities in the UK
