= William Cavendish, Earl of Burlington =

British nobleman and photographer

Earl of Burlington

Chancellor of the University of Derby
- Incumbent
- Assumed office March 2018
- Deputy: Kathryn Mitchell (2018–present)
- Preceded by: Peregrine Cavendish, 12th Duke of Devonshire

Personal details
- Born: William Cavendish; 6 June 1969 (age 57) Tooting, London, England
- Spouse: Laura Roundell (m. 2007)
- Children: 3
- Parent(s): Peregrine Cavendish, 12th Duke of Devonshire; Amanda Heywood-Lonsdale
- Education: Eton College
- Alma mater: University of Cambridge
- Occupation: Photographer

William Cavendish, Earl of Burlington (born 6 June 1969), professionally also known by the name Bill Burlington, is a British aristocrat and photographer. A member of the Cavendish family, he is the only son and heir of the 12th Duke of Devonshire.

== Biography ==
William Cavendish was born at St George's Hospital in south London, the eldest child and only son of Peregrine Cavendish, and his wife, Amanda (née Heywood-Lonsdale), at the time the Marquess and Marchioness of Hartington. He was styled Earl of Burlington from birth.

Lord Burlington was educated at Eton College and the University of Cambridge. He subsequently studied photography under Jorge Lewinski.

His father succeeded to the Dukedom of Devonshire in 2004. Lord Burlington has not assumed the title Marquess of Hartington as all previous heirs apparent to the dukedom have done.

In 2007, he married former model, fashion editor, and stylist Laura Roundell (former wife of the Hon Orlando Montagu, younger son of the 11th Earl of Sandwich) in a private ceremony. They have three children, a son and two daughters:

- Lady Maud Cavendish (born in March 2009)
- James Cavendish, Lord Cavendish (born 12 December 2010); second in line of succession to the Dukedom of Devonshire
- Lady Elinor Cavendish (born 2013)

He is the owner of Pratt's Club.

Lord Burlington was picked as the High Sheriff of Derbyshire for the year 2019–2020.

=== Chancellor of the University of Derby ===
Lord Burlington was installed as the fourth Chancellor of the University of Derby in a ceremony held in the Devonshire Dome (the University's Campus in Buxton) on 15 March 2018. He was nominated for this role after the previous Chancellor, Peregrine Cavendish, 12th Duke of Devonshire, Lord Burlington's father, stood down in 2018 after ten years in the role.

At the announcement of the news the previous year, Lord Burlington stated that he intended to "take the position with an open mind, not with preconceived ideas," and that he was "excited about being part of a university which offers opportunities for students from all backgrounds to reach their potential, succeed in life and contribute to society."

== Art gallery ==
Within a wing of Lismore Castle, the Irish seat of the Dukes of Devonshire, Lord Burlington has established the notable contemporary arts gallery, Lismore Castle Arts.

== Books with photographs by Bill Burlington ==
- Mews Style, Quiller Press Limited (1998), ISBN 1-899163-39-5
- Travels through an Unwrecked Landscape, Pavilion Books (1996), ISBN 1-85793-681-7

Orders of precedence in the United Kingdom
Preceded by Henry Russell, Marquess of Tavistock	Gentlemen; Earl of Burlington	Succeeded by George Spencer-Churchill, Marquess of Blandford
Academic offices
Preceded by Peregrine Cavendish, 12th Duke of Devonshire	Chancellor of the University of Derby; 2018–present	Succeeded by Incumbent
