= Lindsay Bryson =

Royal Navy Admiral (1925–2005)

Admiral Sir Lindsay Bryson KCB FRSE FREng FRAeS
- Born: 22 January 1925; Glasgow, Scotland
- Died: 24 March 2005 (aged 80); Brighton, Sussex, England
- Military career
- Allegiance: United Kingdom
- Branch: Royal Navy
- Service years: 1942–1985
- Rank: Admiral
- Conflicts: World War II; Falklands War
- Awards: Knight Commander of the Order of the Bath

Admiral Sir Lindsay Sutherland Bryson KCB FRSE FREng FRAeS (22 January 1925 – 24 March 2005) was a Scottish Royal Navy officer who went on to be Controller of the Navy.

== Early life and education ==
The son of James McAuslan Bryson (died 1976) and Margaret Whyte (died 1946), Bryson was born and raised on a Glasgow council estate, and was educated at Allan Glen's School. He took a first class honours BSc degree in electrical engineering as an external student of the University of London.

== Naval career ==
Bryson joined the Royal Navy in 1942. He served during World War II as an engineering cadet. He commanded the naval engineering training school, HMS Daedalus, and then led the Royal Navy's guided weapons programmes from 1973. He was promoted to vice admiral on 6 July 1979, and appointed Controller of the Navy in 1981 and served in that role during the Falklands War. He retired on 11 Jan 1985.

After leaving the navy he served in 1985 as President of the Institution of Electrical Engineers and as president of the Association for Project Management 1991–95. He was Deputy Chairman of GEC-Marconi from 1987 to 1990. He was appointed Lord Lieutenant of East Sussex and Brighton and Hove in 1989.

== Personal life ==
In 1951, he married WRNS third officer Averil, daughter of William Thomas Curtis-Willson, MBE president of the Newspaper Society and chairman of the Brighton Herald. They had a son and two daughters, one of whom is the actress Ann Bryson. Lady Bryson died in January 2017.

Military offices
Preceded by Sir John Fieldhouse	Controller of the Navy; 1981–1984	Succeeded by Sir Derek Reffell
