= Kathryn Mitchell (biological psychologist) =

Kathryn Mitchell CBE, DL

Vice-Chancellor of the University of Derby
- Incumbent
- Assumed office 1 August 2015
- Chancellor: William Cavendish, Earl of Burlington
- Preceded by: John Coyne

Personal details
- Born: St Helens, Merseyside, England
- Education: University of York
- Occupation: Psychologist
- Website: www.derby.ac.uk/staff/kathryn-mitchell/

Kathryn Mary Mitchell, CBE, DL (born May 1963) is the vice-chancellor of the University of Derby.

== Early life ==
Mitchell was born and brought up in St Helens in Lancashire. Her father died when she was young, and she was brought up by her mother, who was a deputy head. Mitchell attended the Notre Dame High School, a direct grant grammar school, before going on to the University of York to read psychology.

== Career ==
She became a biological psychologist after largely teaching herself molecular biology.

Mitchell became a Wellcome fellow studying neurotransmitters at the Institute of Psychiatry in London. This work was related to Alzheimer's disease, and she was able to work with Nobel laureate Paul Greengard. She worked at the University of Chicago, the Rockefeller Institute in New York and the Friedrich Miescher Institute in Basel.

Professor Mitchell was deputy vice-chancellor of the University of West London. She was also pro vice-chancellor academic and student support services and dean of students at West London University.

Mitchell was appointed as vice chancellor of the University of Derby in July 2015, succeeding John Coyne, who retired. She is the first woman vice chancellor at the University of Derby.

She is a Deputy Lieutenant of Derbyshire.

She was appointed Commander of the Order of the British Empire (CBE) in the 2022 New Year Honours for services to higher education.

Academic offices
Preceded by John Coyne	Vice Chancellor of University of Derby; 2015 -	Succeeded by Incumbent
