= University Centre Hastings =

Coordinates: 50.8563°N 0.5794°E

- Type: Public HE
- Established: 2003
- Affiliations: University of Brighton; University of Sussex; Open University; Sussex Coast College
- Location: Havelock Road, Hastings TN34 1BE, Hastings, England
- Website: https://www.brighton.ac.uk/hastings

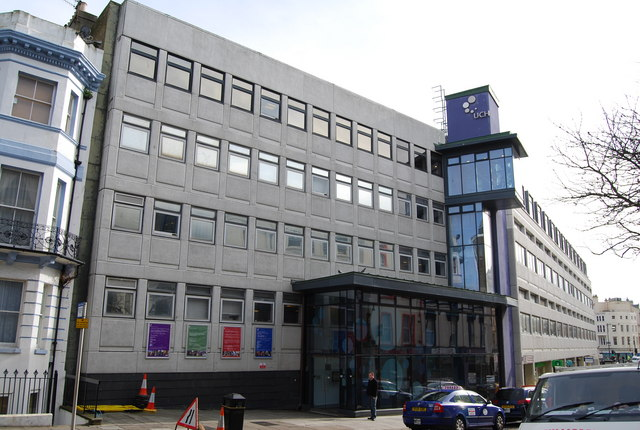
The University Centre building

The University Centre Hastings was a small higher education institute located in Hastings, England that was managed by University of Brighton. The centre was opened in 2003 in buildings previously occupied by BT.

== The University Centre today ==
The University Centre Hastings is no longer in existence. By 2009, the University of Brighton was offering 95% of the courses at University Centre Hastings as other partners withdrew. At this stage, the university took on University Centre Hastings as its fifth campus and its name was changed to University of Brighton in Hastings (it has three other campuses in Brighton). The University of Brighton in Hastings is now closed.
