= Recreational walks in East Sussex =

Recreational activities in East Sussex, England

The following are lists of recreational walks in East Sussex, England

== Short walks ==
- Abbots Wood near Hailsham has two walks, the Abbots Amble, 2.5 kilometres following yellow waymarks and Oak Walk, just over 1 kilometre following red waymarks.
- Beaneys Lane 'A Walk For All Seasons' 1.5 kilometres on the outskirts of Hastings through the Maplehurst Woods SSSI, following wren-marker posts between The Ridge and Stonestile Lane — mostly flat and good surface, one incline near The Ridge.
- Butcher's Trudge, a 2 kilometre circular walk from Butchershole near the town of Friston in Friston Forest following white waymarks.
- Ditchling Common Country Park Trail, located between Haywards Heath and Lewes, 1.5 kilometres long following purple waymarks.
- Forest Way circular walks incorporating parts of the Forest Way — 5 kilometres following orange waymarks from Forest Row, 4.5 kilometres following green waymarks and 6 kilometres following red waymarks from Hartfield, and 8 kilometres following purple waymarks from Groombridge
- The High Weald Area of Outstanding Natural Beauty has a variety of walks — see the link to their website below ('External Links')
- Marline Valley Nature Reserve on the outskirts of Hastings has various walks, but note they are steep and often muddy. No car park, access is from the B2092 Road (Queensway), car drivers are asked to park in one of the roads opposite the site and cross over Queensway (the road is quite busy). A pdf map of the site is available here
- Park Wood in Hellingly (to the north of Hailsham) has a number of signed circular walks.
- Seven Sisters Country Park has an easy to follow path from its Visitor Centre at Exceat (on the A259 road from Eastbourne to Seaford), which goes alongside the River Cuckmere to the sea at Cuckmere Haven.

== Longer walks ==
- Cuckoo Trail, 16 kilometres from Eridge to Polegate, and there is an extension from there to Hampden Park in Eastbourne.
- Forest Way, 14.5 kilometres from Forest Row to Groombridge, plus a linking path between East Grinstead and Forest Row.

== Long-distance paths ==
- 1066 Country Walk, 50 kilometres Pevensey Castle to Rye
- Downs Link — 59 kilometres from the North Downs Way at St. Martha's Hill near Guildford, Surrey to the South Downs Way at Steyning, and on to Shoreham-by-Sea
- High Weald Landscape Trail, running 145 kilometres from Horsham to Rye (West Sussex, East Sussex, Kent)
- Saxon Shore Way, Gravesend, Kent — Hastings 261 km
- South Downs Way National Trail
- Sussex Border Path, 256 kilometres from Thorney Island to Rye
- Sussex Ouse Valley Way, 67.5 kilometres Lower Beeding to Seaford
- Vanguard Way, 107 kilometres from Croydon in south London to Newhaven
- Wealdway, 129 kilometres from Gravesend, Kent to Eastbourne

== See also ==
- Long-distance footpaths in the UK
