= High Weald Landscape Trail =

Footpath in southern England

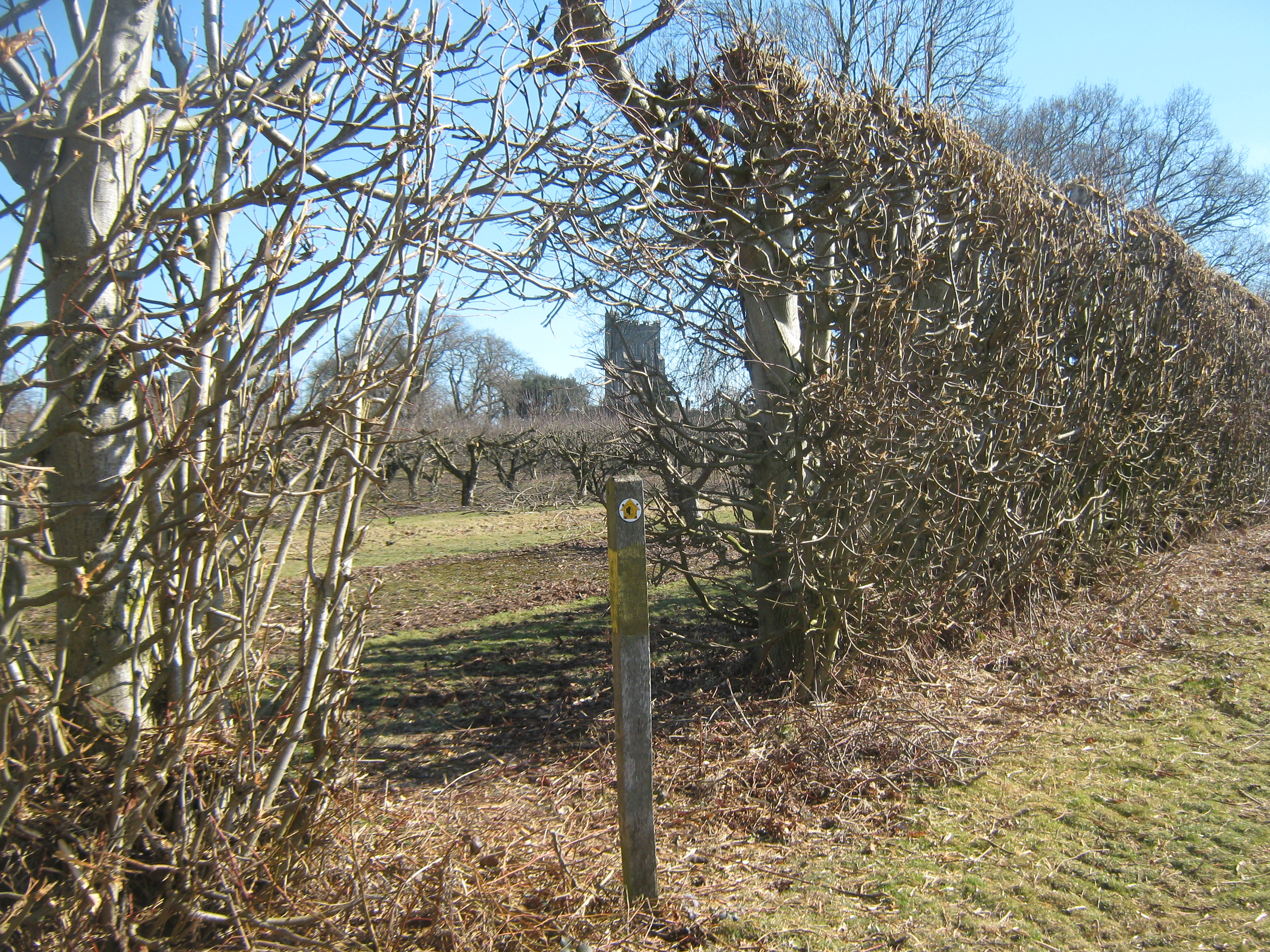
- A scene along the High Weald Landscape Trail towards Wittersham
- Length: 90 mi (140 km)
- Location: East and West Sussex, and Kent England
- Trailheads: Horsham - Rye
- Use: Hiking

The High Weald Landscape Trail (HWLT) is a 145-kilometre (90 mi) route in England between Horsham, West Sussex and Rye, East Sussex, designed to pass through the main landscape types of the High Weald Area of Outstanding Natural Beauty (AONB). It does not follow the highest ground, and the eastern section is only a few feet above sea level. It keeps to the northern edge of the High Weald except in the west where it runs close to the southern edge for a short distance.

The HWLT is not a National Trail within the meaning of the National Parks and Access to the Countryside Act 1949, but a trail of regional importance supported by the High Weald Forum and local authorities in East and West Sussex, and Kent. The route is well signposted in all but a few places, and is marked on the Ordnance Survey Explorer Maps 134, 135, 136 and 125. It follows public rights of way and roads with the occasional permissive path.

The geology is alternating sandstones and clays, and the latter can be very muddy in wet conditions so boots are a must except in very dry weather. Some sections become very overgrown in summer with nettles and brambles so shorts are not advisable.

The official description of the route, and the landscapes it passes through, are described an online guide available from the High Weald AONB website (see external links) which was updated in 2013. The original guide, "Along and Around the High Weald Landscape Trail", is long out of print.

== Route ==
The route is divided into seven sections, each of which starts and ends in a small town or village and can be walked in a day. Each of the seven sections lies predominantly in one of the areas into which the High Weald AONB is subdivided, each having its own dominant landscape (the route does not pass through Ashdown, the Southern Slopes or the Upper Rother areas). The first two sections are in West Sussex in the Western High Weald Area.

=== Section 1 ===
Section 1 starts at Horsham railway station, and follows a road through a residential area to St Leonard's Forest which is crossed from west to east near Handcross, then turns south through Slaugham to Bolney, and then east to Cuckfield.

=== Section 2 ===
Section 2 runs NE from Cuckfield through Borde Hill and Ardingly College with a link path to Haywards Heath, and then north to West Hoathly, east past Stone Farm Rocks and Weirwood Reservoir, and north past Standen and Saint Hill Green to East Grinstead station.

=== Section 3 ===
Section 3 is mainly in East Sussex in the Upper Medway Area. The Forest Way, a path along the old Three Bridges to Tunbridge Wells Central Line, is followed to Forest Row, but the route then runs north of the line in an arc crossing it at Hartfield, through Withyham to Groombridge. The high ground of Ashdown Forest is to the south.

=== Section 4 ===
Section 4 is in Kent in the Central High Weald area and coincides with the High Weald Walk from Groombridge Place via Harrisons Rocks, Eridge Rocks, High Rocks, Frant, Hawkenbury (from where a link path goes into Tunbridge Wells) and Pembury, to the east of which the High Weald Walk is left, and the route heads east to Matfield.

=== Section 5 ===
Section 5 is in the Kentish High Weald through orchards via Brenchley, Sprivers Garden, Goudhurst, Cranbrook, Benenden to Rolvenden.

=== Section 6 ===
Section 6 is in The Kentish High Weald but on leaving Rolvenden the trail drops to within a few feet of sea level before climbing to Tenterden, and turns south past Chapel Down vineyard and Smallhythe Place which was once the harbour master's house of one of England's major ports. It crosses the Isle of Oxney via Wittersham, and joins the Sussex Border Path at the River Rother (crossing back into East Sussex) before climbing to Flackley Ash.

=== Section 7 ===
Section 7 is in the Brede Area of the Sussex High Weald and passes through Peasmarsh before dropping down to near sea level and its termination at Strand Quay, Rye.

== Other recognised paths ==
It runs close to or crosses several other long distance paths, from west to east:

- Downs Link is some 2 miles west of Horsham
- Crosses the Sussex Ouse Valley Way south of Handcross
- Runs along the Sussex Border Path in several places including south of East Grinstead and north of Rye
- Passes the eastern end of the Worth Way at East Grinstead station
- Runs along Forest Way to the SE of East Grinstead, crosses it at Hartfield and passes its eastern end at Groombridge
- Crosses the Vanguard Way at Forest Row
- Crosses the Wealdway at Withyham
- Runs along the southern part of the High Weald Walk south of Tunbridge Wells
- Rye is the western end of Saxon Shore Way and the eastern end of the 1066 Country Walk
- Rye is also on the Royal Military Canal Path
