= Recreational walks in Kent =

Recreational activities in Kent, England

The following is a list of recreational walks in Kent, England.

== Short walks ==
- Ashenbank Wood. Woodland Trust managed wood categorised as ancient woodland in Cobham, Gravesend with two waymarked routes, either part of the Darnley Trail with some stumps and plaques relevant to Cobham Hall and leading on to Shorne Woods Country Park.
- Beacon Wood Country Park, located on the B225 road close to Bean, Dartford, just south of Bluewater Shopping Centre. Reopened after lease expiry August 2011. 76 hectares (190 acres). Has circular walks and an easy access route. No toilets. Small parking charge or covered by Kent's £30 annual ticket.
- Bedgebury National Pinetum (near Goudhurst) has a range of walks and an easy access trail, as well as various cycle tracks. The Visitor Centre is accessed from the B2079 road, about 1 km from the A21 road.
- Blean Woods National Nature Reserve has trails ranging from 1.5 to 13 km, one of which is an easy access trail. The reserve is accessed off the A290, with the entrance opposite Blean, Canterbury. Picnic area but no toilets.
- Bough Beech Nature Reserve, at the north end of Bough Beech Reservoir, has a nature trail and is near the castle-rich Eden Valley Walk, see below.
- Brockhill Country Park near Sandling, Hythe (signposted from Junction 11 of the M20 road) has circular walks of 5 and 9.5 km with gates, stiles and steps however several high-up views. These walks link to the Saxon Shore Way. Also shorter walks. A leaflet is available from the Visitor Centre / cafe. Small parking charge or covered by Kent's £30 annual ticket.
- Brookers Farm circular walk, starts from Caldecott Farm off the B2075 road near New Romney.
- Chartwell, Westerham has three waymarked walks that are accessible even when the property is closed, leaflets available when they are open.
- Cromers Wood Nature Reserve has waymarked circular walks. It is located to the south of Sittingbourne off the B2163 road between Tunstall and Rodmersham. No toilets. Map: http://osm.org/go/0EDVbLyG-
- Dartford Heath has walks of 1.8 km and 1 km, and an easy access trail of 1.3 km. Start at the car park on Heath Road between Dartford and Wilmington. No toilets.
- Dering Wood near Pluckley, Ashford has a waymarked trail. It is located off the Headcorn to Pluckley road.
- Dungeness National Nature Reserve at Dungeness has an easy access nature trail. The RSPB has a Visitor Centre at the site.
- East Blean Wood has a circular walk of just under a km and a 2.5 km 'figure of 8' walk. Located off the A291 road on Hicks Forstal Road (signposted to Hoath).
- Evegate Craft Centre by Evegate hamlet and Evegate Manor, north of Evegate Mill has circular walks. Evegate is signposted off the A20 road between Brabourne Lees and Aldington just SE of M20 J10 Ashford East.
- Faesten Dic Walk at Joyden's Wood (near Bexley and Dartford). 3.3 km circular waymarked trail (following 'Faesten Dic Arrow' waymarks) through the woods and wetlands (the latter on boardwalks). Access is via Ferndell Avenue.
- Golding Hop Farm and Bewley Land House. A circular walk high above Plaxtol Village, Sevenoaks, a charming street based village which slopes down to the conjoined village of Plaxtol Spout by The Bourne. (Directions from motorway) SE from J2A, M26, north before Plaxtol go into start of track where there is parking just after an oast house. From village church (Head down Tree Lane/Sheet Hill), taking the first left and look for the signboards.
- Grove Ferry Picnic Site just east of Upstreet, Canterbury has a circular walk (signposted from the A28 road, entrance is near the Grove Ferry Inn). Many gates but no stiles, paths mostly level. Toilets but no visitor centre. Small parking charge or covered by Kent's £30 annual ticket.
- Ham Street Woods National Nature Reserve, high, near Folkestone, has waymarked trails of 2.5 and 5 km. The Reserve is accessed from the B2067 at Hamstreet. No toilets.
- High Halstow National Nature Reserve on the Hoo Peninsula north of Chatham and Gillingham has a nature trail with attractive sea views and Medway views. Northwood Hill RSPB Reserve. No toilets.
- The High Weald Area of Outstanding Natural Beauty offers various walks — see the link to their website below ('External Links')
- Ightham Mote /ˈaɪtəmˈmoʊt/ Estate walks accessible even when the National Trust property is closed (walks leaflet from the ticket office when it is open).
- Jeskyns Forestry Commission in Cobham. A number of circular trails. Part of the Darnley Trail, see Shorne below.
- The Kent Downs Area of Outstanding Natural Beauty has many different walks — see the link to their website below
- King's Wood on the Kent Downs north of Ashford, just east of Challock, has a circular 'Beech Walk'. Accessed by the A251 (M20, J9).
- Knatts Valley, West Kingsdown between the M25, M26 and M20. Many walks of varying distances and to suit your preferred gradients. A difficulty starting/ending point with details is: The Fox and Hounds Public House
- Leybourne Lakes Country Park with its own roundabout exit off J4 of the M20, between Rochester and Maidstone and paths linking Snodland and New Hythe has a variety of trails.
- Lullingstone Park near Eynsford (Castle Road off the A225 road south of Eynsford) has circular walks from its Visitor Centre within the M25/M26/M20 triangle. Small parking charge or covered by Kent's £30 annual ticket.
- Oldbury Hill Picnic Site, near Ightham (/ˈaɪtəm/ Common has a circular trail. Rail within 2.0 kilometres (1.2 mi) at Kemsing. Small parking charge or covered by Kent's £30 annual ticket.
- Otham, Maidstone has a circular walk of 7 km which includes the Spot Lane Nature Reserve and Stoneacre, a small National Trust property. Details of it are available from its civil parish website in this pdf file.
- Parkwood, Tenterden has woodland walks. Small parking charge or covered by Kent's £30 annual ticket.
- Scotney Old and New Castle, Lamberhurst, Tonbridge has walks that are accessible even when the property is closed, estate walks leaflet available when it is open.
- Shorne Woods Country Park has waymarked circular walks and an easy access trail. It is signposted off the A2 road between Rochester and Gravesend. The 1 km Easy Access Trail (waymarked orange) has recent extensions (waymarks chequered orange and white) allowing a greater range of easy access walking. 1.4 km Purple Walk, 3.1 km Red walk, 3.5 km Heritage Brown Trail best in dryer spells, hilly and muddy in places. 6 km Explorer Trail (waymarked green) with slightly more difficult terrain. Part of the Cobham Hall connected Darnley Trail - 10 km, is now open. Open 9 am - dusk except Christmas Day, has toilets, cafe and visitor centre. Car parking £1.50 weekdays, £2 Saturday/Sunday/Bank Holidays, or covered by Kent's £30 annual ticket.
- Sissinghurst Castle Gardens, Sissinghurst, Cranbrook have woodland and lakeside walks that are accessible even when the property is closed.
- Stodmarsh National Nature Reserve, east of Canterbury, west of Ramsgate, between Stodmarsh and Upstreet, has waymarked trails. Access both at the Stodmarsh and the Upstreet end, with easy access trails from both. The Stodmarsh entrance is accessed via a track from Stodmarsh next to the Red Lion Pub. (Click here for a pdf map of the Reserve).
- Stowting. Off the straight B2068 from Hythe to Canterbury, a circular walk from the lay-by through Round Wood, past adjoining Golf Club, down to Stowting which boasts a mill, trout lake, ancient castle earthwork, pub and church.
- Swanscombe (on the Thames)'s Leisure Centre has information about the Swanscombe Skull Site National Nature Reserve; from there a short waymarked walk explores the Nature Reserve.
- Trottiscliffe /Trosley Country Park is located between Meopham(/ˈmɛpəm/ and Wrotham(/ˈruːtəm/, signposted off the A227 near 20th century-made hilltop Vigo Village. It has a variety of circular trails from the visitor centre / cafe - 2.5 km (yellow - easy access route and 'trim trail'), a flat route of 4 km (red), and a 3 km hilly route (blue) within the country park, plus walk B which goes for 5.5 km through the surrounding countryside. Small parking charge or covered by Kent's £30 annual ticket. The old village itself lies south in the plain has a pub and Grade I Church of St Peter and St Paul 1 km east at Trosley Court.
- White Horse Wood Country Park has circular trails including an easy access trail. It is located high-up and by the dual carriageway between the M2 and M20 (the A259 road opposite the Kent County Showground. Small parking charge or covered by Kent's £30 annual ticket. Down its hill past a ruined ancient castle is the historic village with a pub, Thurnham
- Wye National Nature Reserve has a 4 km long trail, which is steep in places. 2 km south east of Wye near Ashford and Canterbury.

== Intermediate length walks ==
- Blean Woods has a 13 km long trail. The reserve is accessed off the A290, with the entrance opposite Blean village.
- Darent Valley Path, 30 km from Sevenoaks to the River Thames.
- Eden Valley Walk, detailed below
- Len Valley Walk, 19 km from Maidstone to Lenham following the River Len
- Medway Valley Walk, 45 km between Rochester and Tonbridge.
- Miner's Way Trail, 43 km circular footpath, linking up the coalfield parishes of East Kent.
- Swale Heritage Trail, 18 km from Sittingbourne to Goodnestone
- Trosley Country Park is located between Meopham and Wrotham, signposted off the A227 near Vigo Village. It has two longer circular trails from the visitor centre - the Harvel Hike (signposted as walk A), 12 km long, and the Coldrum Trail (signposted as walk C), 10 km long
- Wantsum Walk, 13 km from Herne Bay to Birchington

== Long distance paths ==
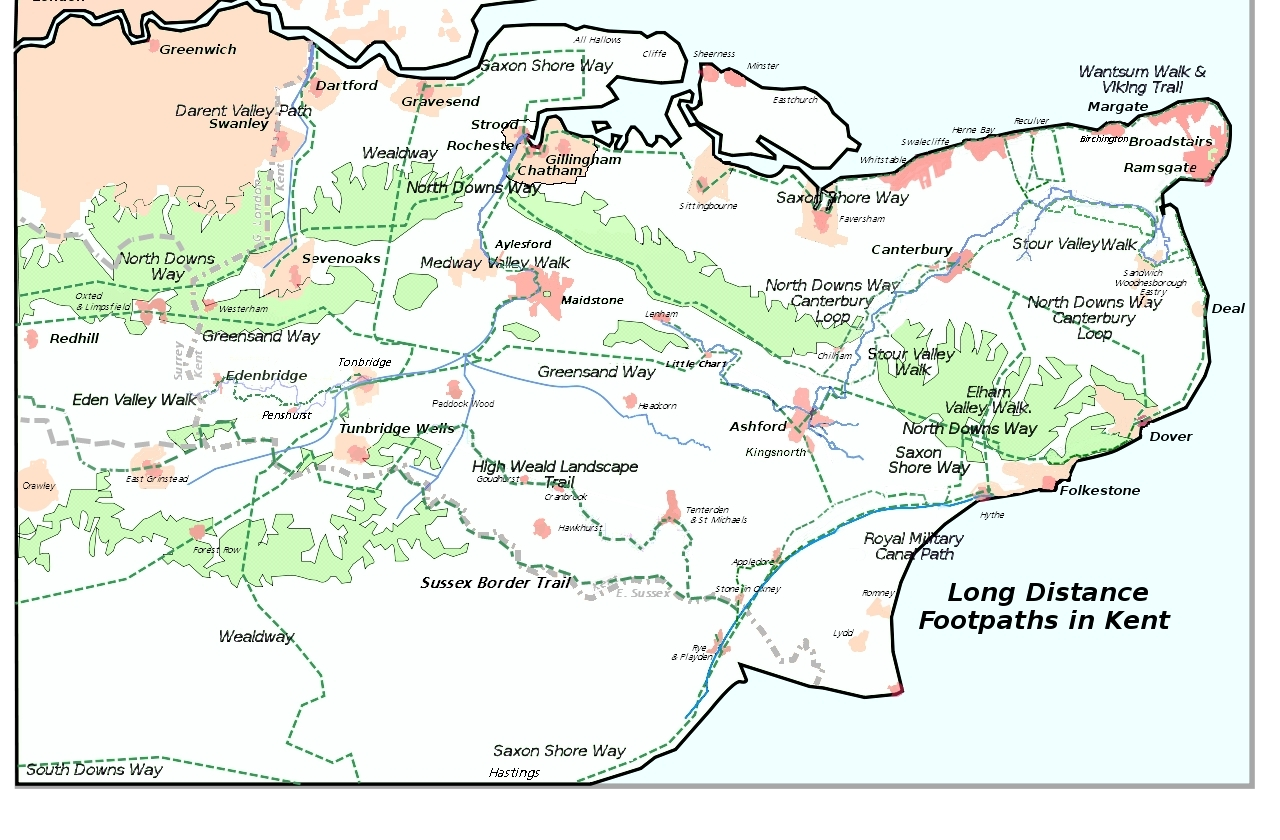
Long distance paths.

- Greensand Way, 169 kilometres (105 mi) from Haslemere, Surrey to Hamstreet where it joins the:
- Saxon Shore Way, 261 kilometres (162 mi) from Gravesend, Kent to Hastings, East Sussex
- High Weald Landscape Trail, 145 kilometres (90 mi) from Horsham, West Sussex to Rye, East Sussex
- North Downs Way N.T. 246 kilometres (153 mi) from Farnham, Surrey to Dover entering Kent at Westerham
- Stour Valley Walk, 82 kilometres (51 mi) from Lenham via Ashford and Canterbury to Pegwell Bay, Sandwich
- Sussex Border Path covering its whole border: the eastern section of the 159 miles (256 km) route is in or directly adjoins Kent
- Vanguard Way 66 miles (106 km) from Croydon to Newhaven, largely in neighbouring counties; its point most within the county runs by Haxted Mill, Edenbridge and links to the 15 miles (24 km) Eden Valley Walk, which embraces Edenbridge and Penshurst, including Hever Castle, Chiddingstone Castle, Penshurst Place and Tonbridge Castle where the Eden Valley Walk then joins the Wealdway
- Wealdway 129 kilometres (80 mi) from Gravesend to Eastbourne, East Sussex
  - N.B. South Downs Way N.T. 160 kilometres (99 mi) to Winchester, mentioned to contrast with the North Downs Way, is from Eastbourne, East Sussex

== See also ==
- Long-distance footpaths in the UK
