= St Leonard's Forest =

Forest in the United Kingdom

Coordinates: 51.063°N 0.268°W

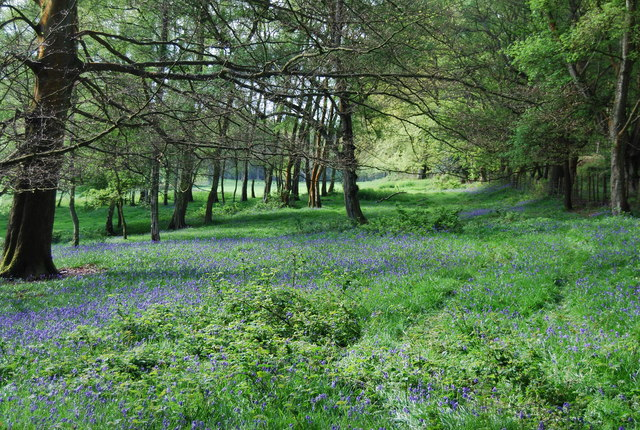
- Bluebells in St Leonard's Forest in 2009
- Interactive map of St Leonard's Forest

Geography
- Location: West Sussex, England
- Elevation: 40 metres (130 ft) to 145 metres (476 ft)
- Area: 12 mi^{2} (31 km^{2})

Administration
- Authority: Multiple - Forestry England, Horsham District Council, Private

Ecology
- Disturbance: Rhododendron
- Lesser flora: Bilberry
- Fauna: Blue butterfly, stonechat

St Leonard's Forest is at the western end of the Wealden Forest Ridge, which runs from Horsham to Tonbridge, and is part of the High Weald Area of Outstanding Natural Beauty. It lies on the ridge to the south of the A264 between Horsham and Crawley, with the villages of Colgate and Lower Beeding within it. The A24 lies to the west and the A23 to the east; and the A272 through Cowfold to the south. Much has been cleared, but a large area is still wooded. Forestry England has 289 ha (714 acres) which is open to the public (many regard this as The St. Leonard's Forest), as are Owlbeech (mainly heathland) and Leechpool Woods (claimed by Horsham District Council to be ancient woodland) to the east of Horsham, and Buchan Country Park to the SW of Crawley. The rest is private, with just a few public footpaths and bridleways. Leonardslee Gardens were open to the public until July 2010 and re-opened in April 2019. An area of 85.4 hectares (211 acres) is St Leonards Forest Site of Special Scientific Interest.

The main car parks are at Roosthole close to Mannings Heath Golf Club for the Forestry Commission, Owlbeech/Leechpool on Harwood Road (B2195), and Buchan Country Park on the A264.

The High Weald Landscape Trail leads from Horsham Station east across the forest to Handcross. The Sussex Ouse Valley Way crosses the south of the forest from Lower Beeding to Handcross.

It is one of the "Fower stately Wood Nymphs" (Michael Drayton, 1611, Poly-Olbion, Song 17) of the Forest Ridge (the other three being Worth, Ashdown and Waterdown forests) which were part of the ancient Andreaswald or Andreadswald, now the Weald.

Earlier used for hunting, by the 16th century they were the centre of the English iron industry. The hammer ponds remain, the dams of those in St. Leonard's forest being crossed by Hammerpond Road between Horsham and Handcross, and today are used for fishing.

== Geology ==
St Leonards Forest is at the western end of a plunging anticline at the centre of the Weald. The height varies from 144 metres O.D. in Pease Pottage to 40 metres O.D. in Horsham. The streams flowing north from the forest are known as brooks - those east of Colgate eventually form the River Mole while those west of Colgate flow into Chennells Brook to join those flowing south (called gills) and together form the River Arun. The latter have cut down exposing bedrock in places. The Forest Ridge east of Colgate is therefore the watershed between the River Thames and the South Coast. The southern edge of the forest drains into the River Adur, and the Ouse drains the south-eastern corner.

Forest Road runs along the top of the anticline, the beds dipping to the north and south at Pease Pottage, to the north west and South West at Colgate, to the west at Horsham and further west the sandstone is covered by the Weald clay. The most western point is at the A24 Broadbridge Heath Roundabout so Horsham is within the forest geologically speaking.

The northern boundary is very distinct, the Holmbush Fault which has a throw of some 30 metres runs from Warnham Mill through Faygate Roundabout on the A264, along the northern edge of Douster and Broadfield Ponds and is best seen immediately north of the top carpark in Tilgate Park. It is marked by a sudden increase in slope when travelling north to south. The southern edge is much more complicated with a large number of faults and folds, but approximates to the A272. The geology continues east into Tilgate and Worth Forests.

The geology consists of beds of sandstones, siltstones and clays, often with a high iron content, called the Tunbridge Wells Sand Formation which are at the top of the Hastings Beds, the lower part of the Wealden Group.

Although mainly sandstones and siltstones there are several layers of clay revealed by muddy sections on the paths and tracks. There are few exposures except in the beds of the streams. The fields are mainly on the sandstones. Those with a constant slope are locally called plains (Shelley Plain and Plummers Plain for example). There are three named sandstones along the ridge, each about three metres thick, but sometimes split by a bed of clay. The lowest is the Shelley Plain sandstone, above that the Colgate sandstone forms the crest of the anticline in Colgate and Pease Pottage. The highest bed is the Roffey Park sandstone which forms the top of Blackhill. Further south a particularly strong sandstone bed is known as Tilgate Stone, but this term has also been used for the whole formation. It was frequently quarried for buildings. A thinly bedded layer is known as Horsham Stone, being quarried to the SW of Horsham, and was used for pavements and roofs. In some examples it has a corrugated surface of ripple marks. Although at a lower altitude it is part of the Wealden Clay formation, deposited later than the Hastings Beds, and is exposed in the forest between the Sidnye Farm and Borde Hill faults SE of Lower Beeding, and between Crabtree and Cowfold, again due to faulting.

The beds in the western part of the forest have sufficient iron to have been worth mining – clays, silts and sandstones were all mined.

These rocks were laid down in an early Cretaceous floodplain of either a braided or meandering river whose source was in the high ground of Londinia to the north east. The clays indicate rising sea levels turned the flood plain into a coastal lagoon at times. Several thousand feet of Weald clay, greensands and chalk have been eroded from the top of the anticline.

The main source for the above is The Horsham Memoir.

== History ==
=== Early history ===
The forest was part of the large wooded area now known as the Weald which extended from Hampshire east to the sea between Eastbourne and Dover, and bounded by the North and South Downs which are formed of chalk and hence have a very different vegetation. The Weald was mainly impenetrable, but vegetation must have been thinner on the poor sandy beds that top the forest ridge because Mesolithic people created a trackway along the top and have left tumuli and worked flints along its route.

The forest was opened up to a limited extent by the South Saxons pushing north from the South Coast, and the Middle Saxons south from the North Downs. However, the boundary between the two was not along the watershed, but along the Clay Ridge to the north (the Surrey/Sussex border).

=== St. Leonard of Limousin ===
The forest's name is believed to have come from St Leonard (c. 485–559), a Frankish nobleman who was baptised at the court of King Clovis in 498 by St Remigius, Bishop of Rheims, and then settled for a religious life. St. Leonard's prayers are said to have ensured the safe delivery of Clovis's child, and he was given as a reward as much land as he could ride round on a donkey in a day. He established a monastery on this land at Noblac near Limoges, and became its abbot. In his old age he became a forest hermit.

Noblac became a place of pilgrimage and was visited by crusaders including Richard Coeur de Lion, and it may be that this is how the story came to the south of England where some one hundred churches are named after the saint. Local legend says that St. Leonard's hermitage was in this forest, although this seems extremely unlikely.

The tithes for the forest were granted to Sele Priory in Upper Beeding and St. Leonard was regarded by the Benedictines who built a hermitage dedicated to him in the forest although the site is unknown. This may be the same place as the Chapel of St. Leonard built by the Braoses of Bramber Castle.

=== The dragons ===
There is also a legend of St. Leonard the Dragon Slayer. Æthelweard's Chronicle of 770 AD says that "Monstrous serpents were seen in the country of the Southern Angles that is called Sussex". St. Leonard was injured and Lilies of the Valley grow where his blood fell; an area of the forest is still called The Lily Beds. As a reward he requested that snakes be banished and that the nightingales which interrupted his prayers should be silenced. However, dragons were still supposedly around in August 1614 as a pamphlet was published with the title "Discourse relating a strange and monstrous Serpent (or Dragon) lately discovered, and yet living, to the great Annoyance and divers Slaughters both of Men and Cattell, by his strong and violent Poyson. In Sussex, two miles from Horsam, in a Woode called St. Leonards Forrest, and thirtie miles from London, this present month of August, 1614".

Today the only dragons are the public house at Colgate, the 2001 bronze dragon statue in Horsham Park, the statue in the gardens of Horsham Horsham Museum, and a wooden carved bench in the forest itself.

=== The Middle Ages ===
In 1086 the Sauvage family held Sedgwick Park on the west of the forest, and it was subsequently held by the Braoses of Bramber Castle who were given a licence to crenellate Sedgwick Castle in 1258. At this time the main use of the forest was pannage with the lords of Bramber and Bewbush holding the rights. The tithes of pannage and herbage were given to Sele Priory in 1235. The forest also had wild horses, and this may be the origins of the name Horsham which dates back to the 10th century. A horse fair was held on St Leonard's Day in the 15th century. Deer and timber belonged to the lord. Timber from the forest was sent to Dover in 1214 for use in the new great hall. Oak was given to the Bishop of Chichester in 1234 for the cathedral. Sele Priory had the rights to the underwood in 1234 - this was used to produce charcoal, hence the name Colgate (a charcoal burner was known as a collier). In 1295 the forest contained deer, hares, rabbits, pheasants and herons.

Later the forest was surrounded by a pale or fence and was technically a chase rather than a forest (used for hunting but not under forest law). There were gates into the forest, some of whose names still remain - Faygate in the north, Monk's Gate in the south west and Pease Pottage Gate (the gate was dropped from the name in 1877) in the east. Other gates were between subdivisions within the forest such as Colgate. Some names refer to clearings - Doomsday Green and Mannings Heath for example.

Little is known of the forest apart from legal records until the building of the hermitage or chapel, by which time it was known as Lower Beeding - Lower meaning inferior or new. The forest was larger than the modern parish, effectively the part of the Rape of Bramber in the High Weald including Rusper, Ifield, the eastern part of modern Horsham and Nuthurst. The eastern boundary was the border of the Rape of Bramber, to the east of which it became Worth Forest in the Rape of Lewes although today there is not a clear boundary between the two. The Hundred of Burbeach consisted of Upper Beeding in the south and Lower Beeding and Ifield in the north and the whole of this northern part was known as St Leonards, but it extended further to the west. The first large scale map of Sussex by Saxton in 1575 shows Crawley and Slaugham churches, The Forest of St Leonard's extending north to nearly the Surrey border, and Word Forest, but just white space between them. Speed's map of 1610 (surveyed by John Nordon about 1595) also shows three enclosed parks - St. Leonard's, Schelley and Bewbush, with the Rape border and Tylgate Forest on the east. Neither map shows any roads.

=== 16th century ===
In the 16th century the forest was divided into bailiwicks - Roffey, Bewbush, Alkynburne (Hawksbourne), Horningbrook, Hyde, Shelley, Whitebarrow, Thrustlehole, Herony, Gosden and Patchgate, many of which are still recognisable today. It was around this time that the forest started to be cleared, wood being used for barrels, buildings and charcoal, the latter being used for both iron production and by the townsfolk of Horsham. In 1553 it was reported that there were no deer or other game in the forest. By the end of the century there were some 40 farms in the forest. These were not very successful except in Bewbush because of the poor soil.

It is not known when ironworking started in the forest, but it was well established by the middle of the century. It is known that the Romans worked iron nearby at Crawley, and there may have been workings earlier than the 16th century, but there are no remains or records, except for a thousand horseshoes produced at a forge at Roffey in 1327. The most obvious remains today are Hawkins Pond and Hammer Pond on the sources of the Arun, the dams of which are used by Hammerpond Road to cross the deep gills. There was a blast furnace at Bewbush which produced pig iron, and this was converted to wrought iron by the finery forges below the two ponds. The water was required to drive a waterwheel which in turn raised the trip hammers. Around 1584 a blast furnace was built at Hammer Pond to process ore from near Colgate, up to a 1000 loads of ore per year.

Another furnace was built at Crabtree in about 1580, the ore coming from Minepits Wood, and 49 miners were employed in 1587. There were also furnaces at Slaugham which obtained their ore from the forest - Furnace Pond is in both Slaugham and Lower Beeding.

The main iron products were cannon and firebacks. Graveslabs are also found in some churches.

Iron production in the area finished about 1650 when the iron works were destroyed by a parliamentary force.

The iron industry was not solely responsible for the loss of the woods because although a few large timbers were used for buildings and machinery, the main requirement was for charcoal which was produced initially from the undertimber and later by coppicing.

=== 17th century ===
The Crown had the rights to the timber in 1602 and during the first half of the century much of the large timber had been used for shipbuilding. Other timber was used for charcoal, and by the middle of the century large areas had been cleared, especially Bewbush and Shelley Plain. Cattle, sheep and rabbits prevented regrowth and these two areas remained arable. Elsewhere the forest degenerated into heathland, although there were intermittent attempts to farm it.

=== 18th century ===
Rabbits were the main produce of the forest. The first warrens are mentioned in 1614. At the beginning of the 18th century there were five including the Great Warren to the south of Colgate, Plummers Plain and Sibballs (now known as Holmbush). By the end of the century, the latter had some twelve thousand rabbits, London being the main market. The forest was described as bleak and barren as the Cumberland and Yorkshire moorland, and William Cobbett who travelled from Pease Pottage to Horsham in 1823 described it as "six of the worst miles in England...The first two of these miserable miles go through the estate of Lord ERSKINE [Lord Chancellor]. It was a bare heath here and there, in the better parts of it, some scrubby birch. It has been, in part, planted with fir-trees, which are as ugly as the heath was; and, in short, it is a most villainous track".

However Michael Mills planted a straight avenue of trees around 1720, and although these were blown down in 1836, the line of the avenue remains as a long narrow clearing (legend says that Mick Mills raced the devil and won - he went so fast that he burnt the trees on either side and they would never regrow).

=== 19th century ===
Much of the heathland was converted into pasture, but trees, mainly larch, fir, oak, sweet chestnut and spruce, were also planted, mainly in the large estates such as Holmbush, Bewbush and Buchan Hill. Exotic gardens containing magnolias, rhododendrons etc. were developed in the second half of the century, Leonardslee and South Lodge being two well known examples. New dams were built to create lakes for ornamentation at Leonardslee, fishing and boating at Buchan Hill. A tower 106 feet high was built at Holmbush, hence the name Tower Road which replaced Beacon Hill which gives an indication of its former use, probably in Napoleonic times.

=== 20th century ===
The main change in the 20th century as far as vegetation was concerned was the spread of rhododendron throughout the forest except where the dense planting by the Forestry Commission prevented it growing. The proportion of heathland diminished except where it was deliberately preserved, as in Buchan Country Park. The opening of this park and also Owlbeech and Leechpool Woods near Horsham took place in the second half of the century and these together with Forestry England land afford public access to parts of the forest. Building has increased throughout the forest although it is now an Area of Outstanding Natural Beauty.

Two large golf courses were constructed at Mannings Heath and Buchan Hill. Both have 36 holes, and the first at Mannings Heath dates back to 1905. Buchan Hill is post Second World War.

=== 21st century ===
There is a campaign to reduce the area covered by rhododendron - unfortunately the more it is cut back the more it regrows. The proportion of native woodland will be increased over the next thirty years.

== Popular culture ==
In The Dragon's Eye, Part 1 of The Dragonology Chronicles, St. Leonard's Forest is where many dragons live. St Leonard's Forest and its dragons also features in the Hellboy story The Nature of The Beast. In Episode 4 of BBC's Elizabeth R, Horrible Conspiracies, Mary, Queen of Scots complaining of her captivity, mentions Saint Leonard's forest as a "wood where nightingales never sing," because "some unseen evil drives them away".
