= Medway Valley Walk =

Footpath in Kent, England

Coordinates: 51°17′37″N 0°30′41″E

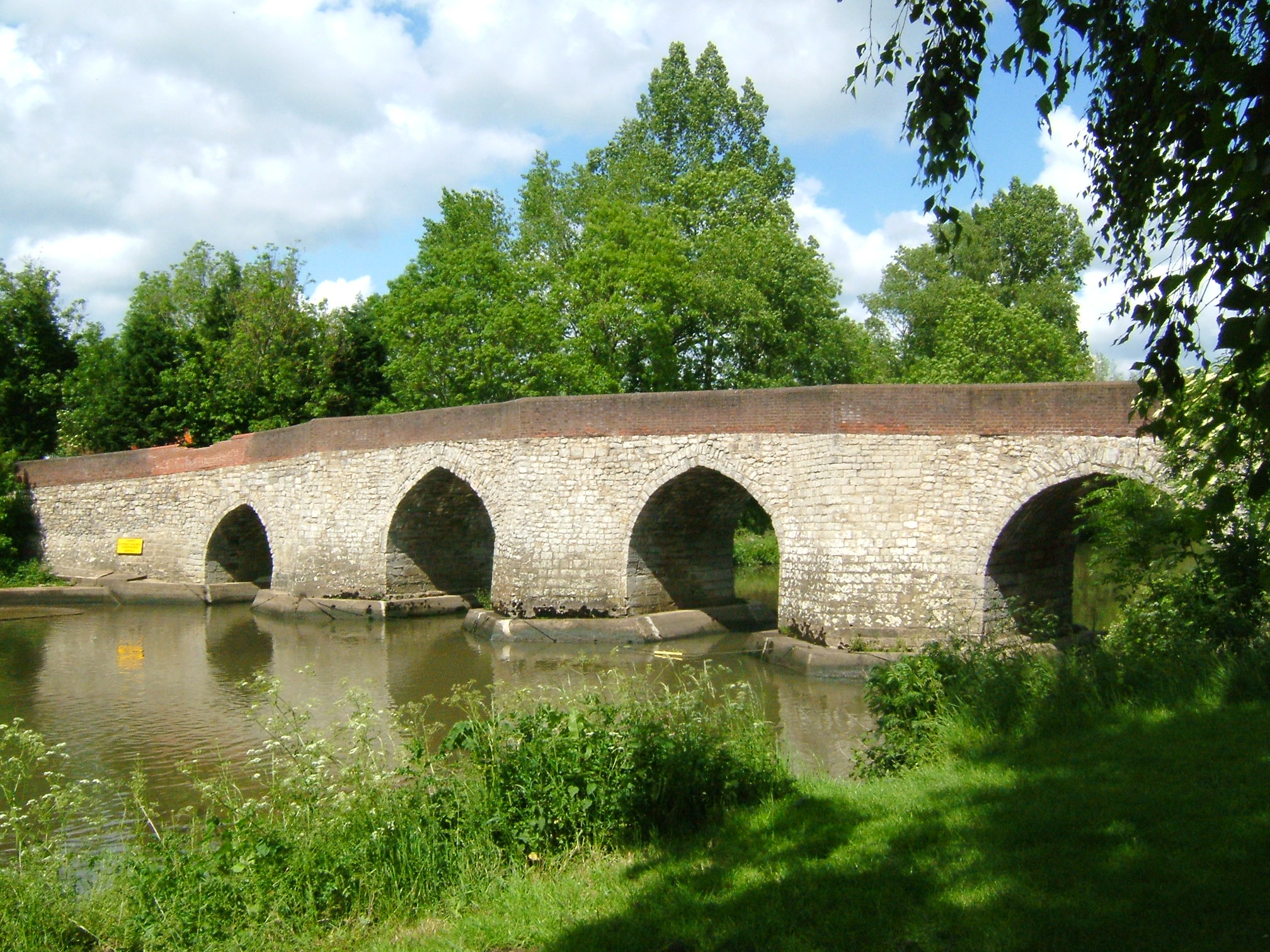
- Joined by the Greensand Way- The Twyford Bridge, Yalding, Kent
- Length: 44.8 km (27.8 mi)
- Location: South Eastern England, United Kingdom
- Trailheads: Rochester, Kent; Tonbridge, Kent
- Use: Walking
- Highest point: 21 m (69 ft)
- Lowest point: 0 m (0 ft)
- Difficulty: Easy
- Season: All year
- Sights: Kentish countryside

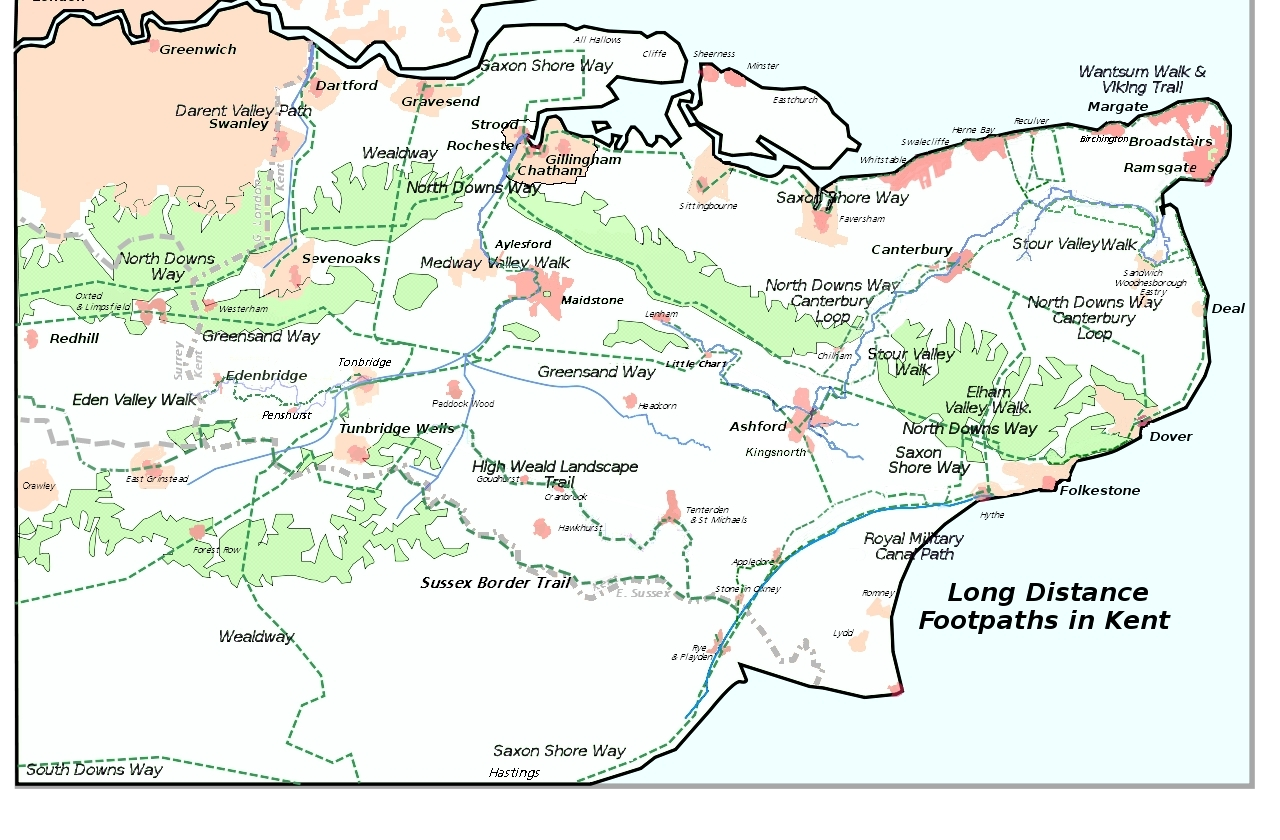
The Medway Valley Walk, and the other long distance footpaths in Kent

The Medway Valley Walk follows the River Medway from Rochester to Tonbridge. Above Allington, it follows the bank of the Medway Navigation. It starts on the Saxon Shore Way at Rochester. The North Downs Way crosses the Medway Valley Walk at the eastern end of the Medway Viaduct or motorway bridge. The Greensand Way crosses the walk at Yalding. At West Peckham, it is joined by the Wealdway which continues through to Tonbridge, thus linking with the Eden Valley Walk.

Th entire walk is 44.8 km The Maidstone Millennium River Park is a 10 kilometre (6 mi) stretch from Teston Country Park to the Museum of Kent Life at Sandling. It follows the walk. The park was built between 1998 and 2001; it has transformed 18 acres (7.3 ha) of wasteland and led to the construction of three new footbridges over the river all accessible from the walk. A major part of the park is Whatman Park in the centre of Maidstone.
