= High Weald National Landscape =

Protected landscape in south-east England

Coordinates: 51.112°N 0.411°W

- Typical view of a ridge top village in the High Weald AONB

- Location of the High Weald AONB in the UK
- Location: England
- Area: 1,460 km^{2} (560 sq mi)
- Established: 28 October 1983
- Governing body: High Weald Joint Advisory Committee

The High Weald National Landscape is an Area of Outstanding Natural Beauty (AONB) in south-east England. Covering an area of 1,450 square kilometres (560 sq mi), it takes up parts of Kent, Surrey, East Sussex, and West Sussex. It is the fourth largest AONB in England and Wales. It has an attractive landscape with a mosaic of small farms and woodlands, historic parks, sunken lanes and ridge-top villages.

The area consists of 99 parishes and a total population of approximately 120,000 persons. The main communities are Royal Tunbridge Wells, Crowborough, Hastings and Haywards Heath.

== Designation and administration ==
The High Weald AONB was designated under the National Park and Access to the Countryside Act 1949 in October 1983. Designation as an AONB gave official recognition to the unique landscape of the High Weald, strengthened the ability of government agencies and local authorities to conserve and enhance the landscape, and provided priority for financial support for these objectives from the principal government agency responsible for AONBs, the Countryside Agency (now Natural England). AONBs do not possess separate administrative structures like Britain's National Parks, but rely on existing structures. In the case of the High Weald, this requires co-ordination of the policies and management activities of fifteen local authorities, comprising four counties (Surrey, West Sussex, East Sussex and Kent) and eleven district authorities.

== Geology ==
The High Weald lies at the core of the distinctive Weald anticline. At its margins are the relatively flat clay vales of the Low Weald, the Greensand Ridge, the North Downs and South Downs. At the centre, the sandstones and clays formed geologically of the Hastings Beds of the early Cretaceous period rise up to give the characteristic forested ridges of the High Weald. This geology and the subsequent dissection of the sandstone core by rivers such as the Ouse, Medway and Rother are fundamental to its underlying landscape character. The headwaters of these rivers have cut deep, steep-sided valleys (ghylls) which are wet and clayey. On this underlying geological structure centuries if not millennia of human activity have created the landscape that is visible today.

== Landscape ==
The Weald was once densely wooded. The vast forest between the North and South Downs was called Coit Andred by the Celtic Britons, Silva Anderida by the Romans, and Andredesleage or Andredesweald by the Saxons. Much of it has been cleared or broken up by humans over the past 1,500 years. However, the High Weald still has a much higher woodland density than other areas.

At the time of the Domesday Book, 1086, the High Weald was the most wooded natural area in England. Today, 24.6% of the AONB is woodland, compared with a national figure of about 9%. Of this, 17.6% is ancient woodland; in other words, over half the area's woodlands are ancient. The area of the High Weald AONB represents only 1% of England yet it has 3.4% of England's woodlands, making it one of the most densely wooded landscapes.

The highest sandstone hills of the High Weald are referred to as the Weald Forest Ridge. This ridge includes a number of ancient heathland forests, notably Ashdown Forest, St Leonards Forest, Worth Forest and Dallington Forest. Ancient woodland covers 22% of the Weald Forest Ridge (total woodland cover is 40%), which represents a significant proportion of the resource in the UK.

== Economy ==
Farming was a marginal activity and production typically mirrored local demand; woodland however was measured in terms of how many hogs it would support in the Domesday survey, the raising of which in woodland mainly ceased by the 20th century. The rapid growth of the iron industry from about 1490, together with the development of crafts such as weaving and tanning, made it, for a time, one of the wealthiest districts of England. By the 18th and 19th centuries these activities had moved to more favourable areas, leaving farming as the mainstay of the rural economy, though the majority of farms were and remain small and seldom very profitable. Today, agriculture, mainly livestock farming, remains the main AONB land use, but in 2007 it only accounted for 67.5% of the total area, an increase of 6% from 2000; by 2010 agriculture may account for less than half the area.

Employment in the traditional rural industries of the High Weald, agriculture, forestry and mineral working (gypsum, notably, is mined from the Purbeck Beds near Battle), declined rapidly during the late 20th century to a point where less than 10% of employees are now engaged in these activities. In the case of agriculture, only around 4,500 people are now employed out of a total estimated population of 124,880. Despite this, agriculture remains an important employer, along with tourism and leisure. There are few large firms in the private sector, and most firms are very small.

Significant wealth has been brought into the High Weald over the centuries by those from outside wishing to live there. The trend for prosperous urban dwellers to move to the countryside is apparent as early as the 14th century. Kent was the most popular destination due in part to its accessibility to London and its particular form of land tenure which enabled land to be freely negotiable. The process of migration accelerated in the 19th century with the advent of the railways, which made access from London much easier. The resources brought into the area by wealthy incomers created and maintained the many parks and gardens that are now characteristic of the High Weald landscape.

Today the High Weald is still economically dependent, not so much on wealthy landowners but on large numbers of commuters living there who travel outside the area to work, mainly to the Crawley/Gatwick conurbation, the coastal towns and London. Today 70% of residents commute to work outside the area while less than 7% make their living directly from the land.

== Recreation ==
Several long distance paths cross the AONB: High Weald Landscape Trail, Wealdway, 1066 Country Walk, Saxon Shore Way, Vanguard Way and Sussex Border Path. The total length of footpaths is 2063 kilometres.

Bewl Water, one of five reservoirs in the AONB, is the largest body of inland water in south-east England and one of the area's most important tourist and recreational destinations.

Bedgebury Forest, a large area of ancient woodland and heath covering some 10.5 square kilometres (2,600 acres), has facilities for mountain biking, horse-riding and other recreational activities, while Bedgebury National Pinetum, which the forest surrounds, is said to be the most complete collection of conifers on one site anywhere in the world, and a major tourist attraction.

Ashdown Forest is an internationally important area of lowland heathland occupying the highest sandstone ridge-top of the High Weald. It was also the setting for the Winnie-the-Pooh stories of AA Milne. Accounting for two-thirds (65.5%) of the AONB's heathland, it receives special protection as a UK Site of Special Scientific Interest, as a European Union Special Protection Area for birds and European Union Special Area of Conservation for its heathland habitats, and by its membership of Natura 2000, which brings together Europe's most important and threatened wildlife areas. Ashdown Forest's commons are open to the public.

== Bibliography ==
- Brandon, Peter (2003). The Kent & Sussex Weald. Chichester: Phillimore & Co Ltd. ISBN 1-86077-241-2.
- Brandon, Peter; Short, Brian (1990). The South East from AD 1000. London: Longman. ISBN 0-582-49245-9.
