= St Leonard's Forest SSSI =

Research site

Coordinates: 51.057°N 0.272°W

- Site of Special Scientific Interest
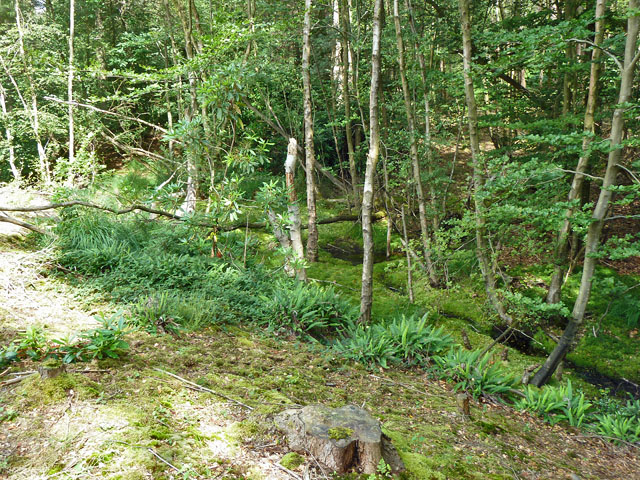
- Location of St Leonard's Forest SSSI.
- Area of search: West Sussex
- Grid reference: TQ 212 301
- Interest: Biological
- Area: 85.4 hectares (211 acres)
- Notification date: 1987
- Location map: Magic Map

St Leonard's Forest SSSI is an 85.4-hectare (211-acre) biological Site of Special Scientific Interest east of Horsham in West Sussex. The SSSI is in two separate areas, with the western part being in the 289-hectare (710-acre) Forestry Commission managed St Leonard's Forest.

Much of the forest is deciduous woodland, which is dominated by pedunculate oak, silver birch, common birch and beech. The humid microclimate of a narrow valley has allowed mosses and liverworts to survive which indicate continuous woodland cover for the past 5,000 years. Butterflies include the rare purple emperor.

There is public access to the western part of the site.
