= Vanguard Way =

Long-distance path in southern England

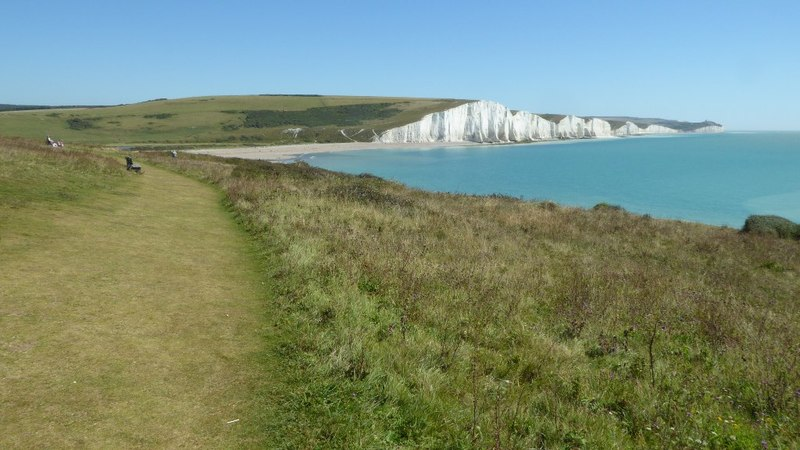
- Looking east along the Vanguard Way towards the Seven Sisters at Cuckmere Haven
- Length: 106.5 km (66 mi)
- Location: Southern England
- Trailheads: East Croydon station, Greater London; 51°22′30″N 0°05′33″W; Newhaven Harbour station, East Sussex; 50°47′23″N 0°03′20″E
- Use: Hiking
- Season: All year

The Vanguard Way is a long-distance path of 66.2 mi (106.5 km) from East Croydon station in outer London (OS grid reference TQ328658), travelling from the north, to Newhaven, on the south coast of England. It passes through the counties of Surrey, Kent and East Sussex, between Croydon and Newhaven, East Sussex. It connects the London suburbs to the south coast, via the North Downs, Ashdown Forest, South Downs National Park and the Cuckmere valley.

The walk was developed in celebration of the 15th anniversary in 1980 of the Vanguards Rambling Club, who named themselves after an occasion when they returned from a walk travelling in the guard's van of a crowded train. The route's formal establishment occurred on 3 May 1981, and the Vanguards Rambling Club remained as the route's management until 2022, when responsibility was transferred to the Vanguard Way Association.

The Vanguard Way connects with central London with the Wandle Trail along the River Wandle from Croydon and is sometimes used as a walking route between London and Paris, connecting with the ferry ports on the south coast. The walk also connects with the London Outer Orbital Path, North Downs Way, Pilgrims' Way, Greensand Way, London Countryway, Eden Valley Walk, Forest Way, Wealdway, Sussex Border Path, the South Downs Way and the England Coast Path.

== Places on the way ==
- Croydon
- Woldingham
- Crockham Hill
- Forest Row
- Blackboys
- Berwick
- Alfriston
- Seaford
- Newhaven

== Gallery ==
Views along Vanguard Way
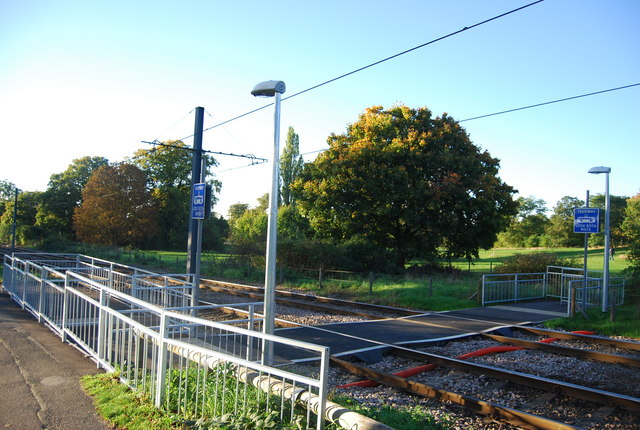
Vanguard Way crosses the tram line

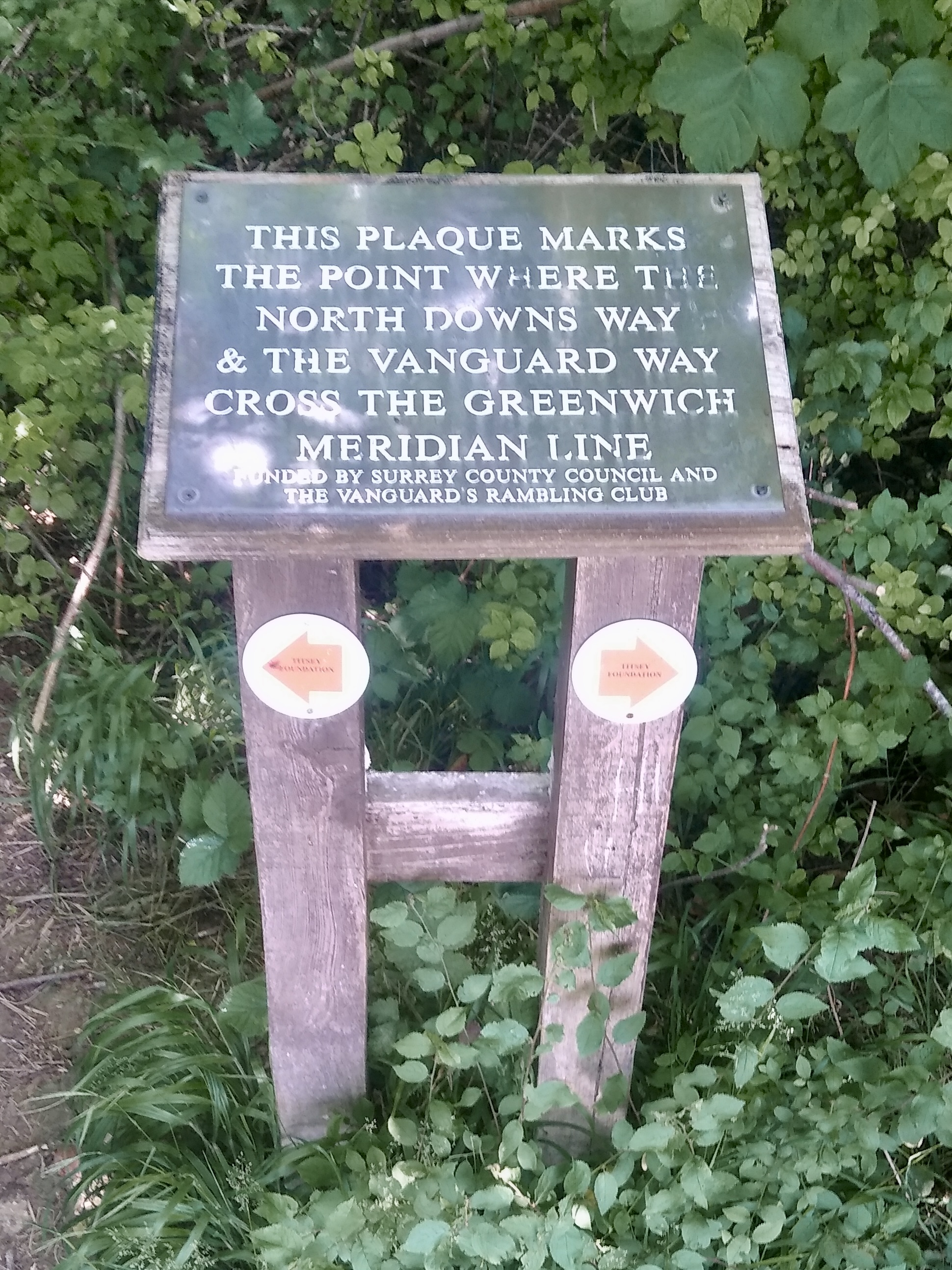
The Vanguard Way crosses the prime meridian to the north of Oxted, Surrey

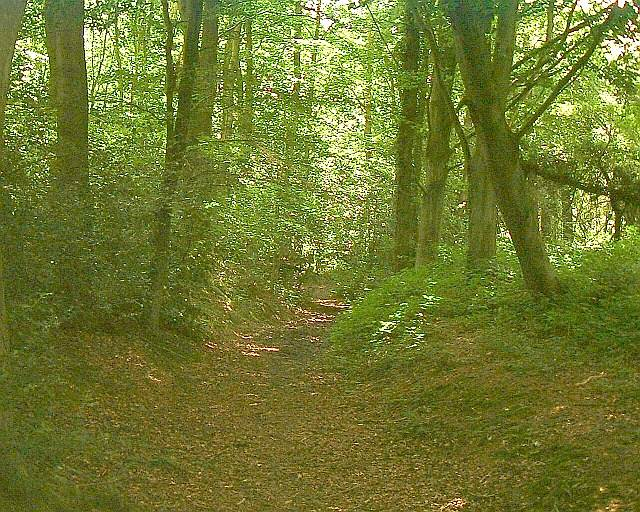
Woodland portion near Buxted

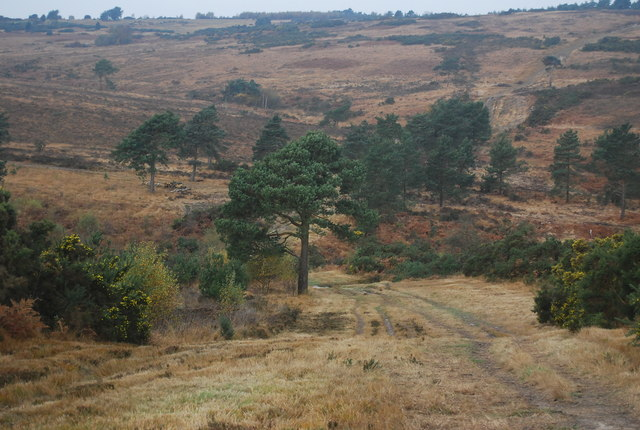
Vanguard Way across Ashdown Forest

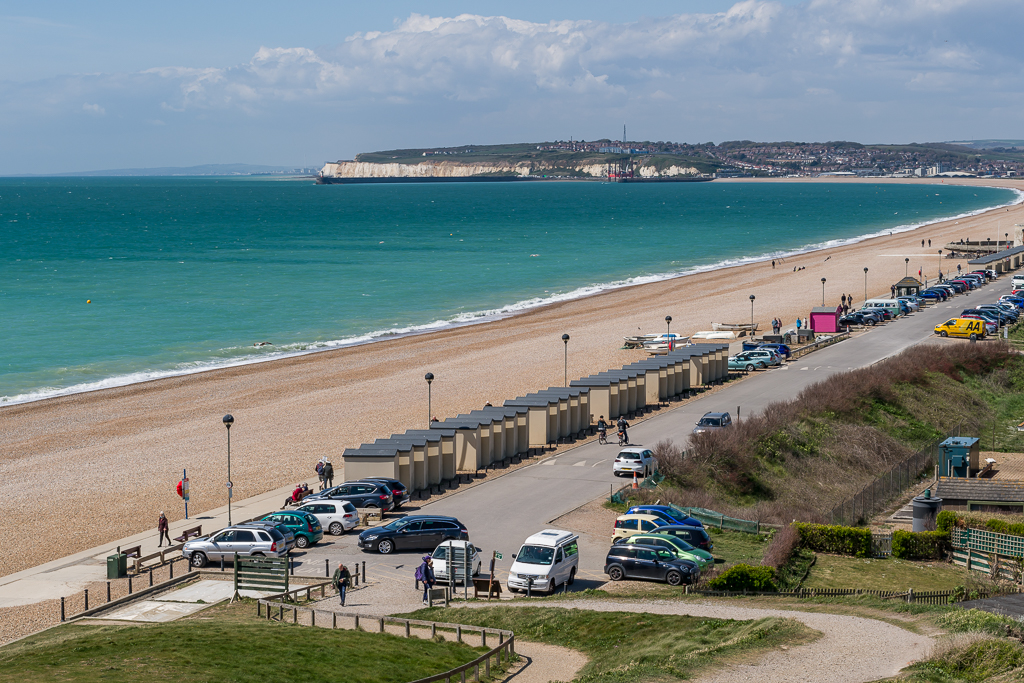
View west from the Vanguard Way along Seaford Beach

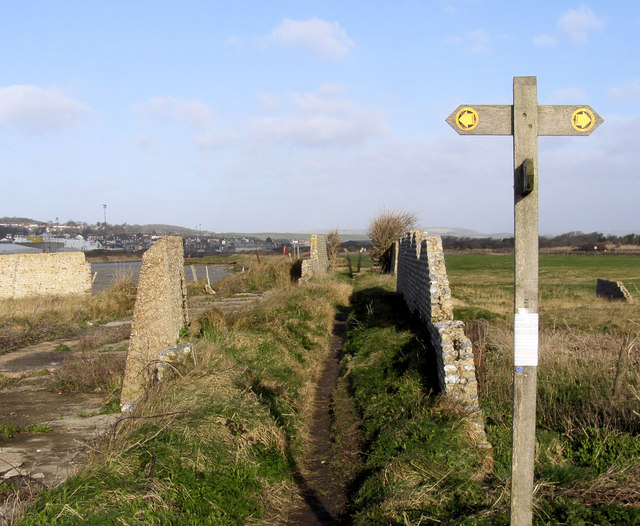
From Tide Mills towards Newhaven
