= 1066 Country Walk =

Long-distance footpath in East Sussex, England

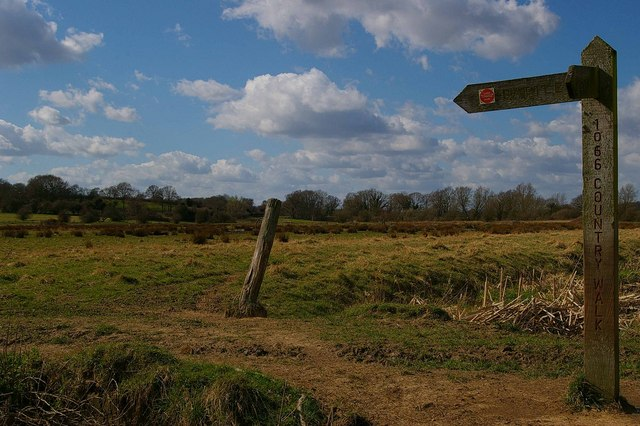
- A signpost pointing to Battle on the 1066 Country Walk
- Length: 31 mi (50 km)
- Location: England
- Designation: Long-distance trail

The 1066 Country Walk is a waymarked long-distance footpath or recreational walk in Southern England. It runs for 50 kilometres (31 mi).

The route commemorates 1066, the year of the Battle of Hastings, and seeks to link the places and the people of that important year. It runs through East Sussex from Pevensey, where William of Normandy gathered his invading army of Normans and prepared to meet King Harold, to Rye, East Sussex, passing through Battle, East Sussex.

The walk is mainly low level and passes through rolling countryside beside oast houses, windmills and parts of the South Downs.

It links with the Saxon Shore Way.
