= Sussex Ouse Valley Way =

42-mile footpath in Sussex, England

Coordinates: 50°47′0.51″N 0°3′26.1″E

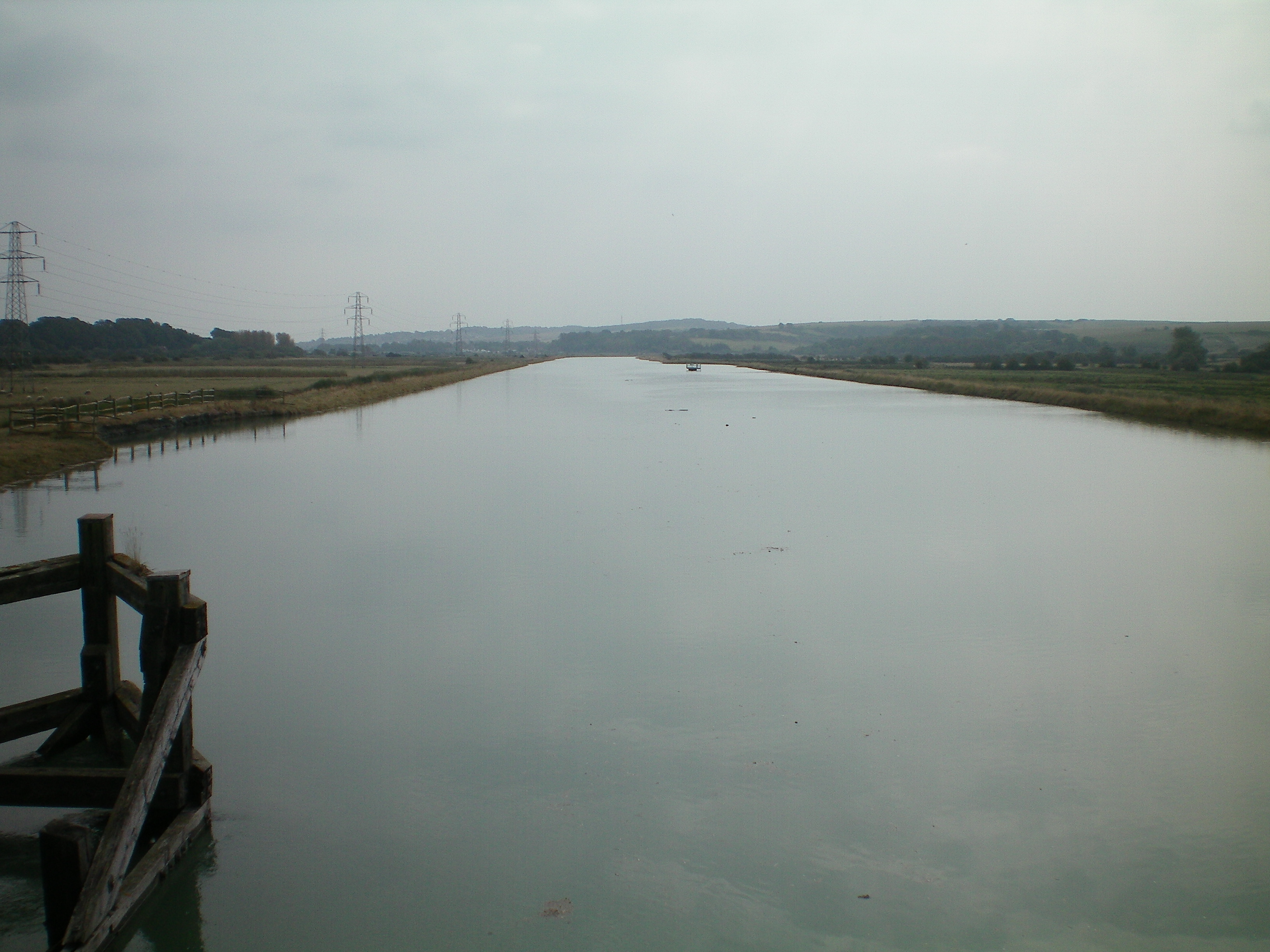
A southward view from Southease swing bridge with the trail on the right bank of the river

The Sussex Ouse Valley Way is a 42-mile (68 km) long-distance footpath which closely follows the route of the Sussex Ouse. It starts at the Ouse's source in Lower Beeding, West Sussex, when it's still a little stream. It then passes through many villages and towns including Slaugham, Handcross, Staplefield, and Lewes. It terminates at Seaford on the English Channel, where it joins the Vanguard Way.
