= Forest Way =

Rail trail in south east England

Coordinates: 51°1′N 0°04′W

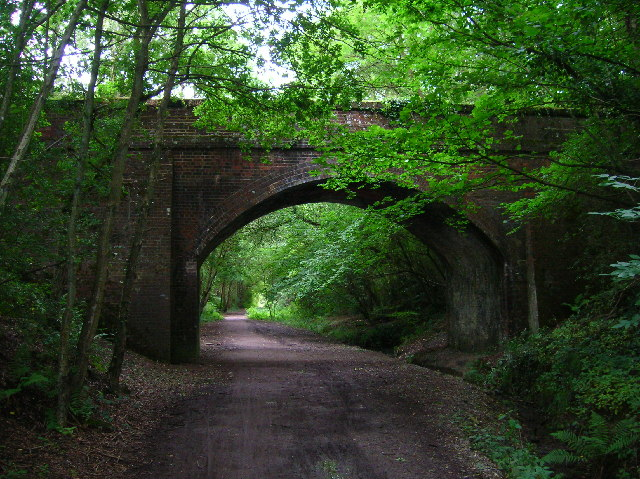
- Length: 10 mi (16 km)
- Location: West Sussex, England
- Trailheads: East Grinstead - Groombridge
- Use: Hiking, cycling, horseriding

The Forest Way is a linear Country park providing walking, cycling, horse riding and the quiet enjoyment of the countryside. It runs for around 16 km from East Grinstead to Groombridge.

The Forest Way lies within the High Weald Area of Outstanding Natural Beauty in the heart of the picturesque East Sussex countryside with the Ashdown Forest lying to the south. It takes the route of a disused railway line and now provides an important habitat for wildlife forming a ‘green corridor’ through the upper valley of the River Medway. The route runs from East Grinstead, via Forest Row, Hartfield, and Withyham to Groombridge.

== Walking, cycling and accessibility ==
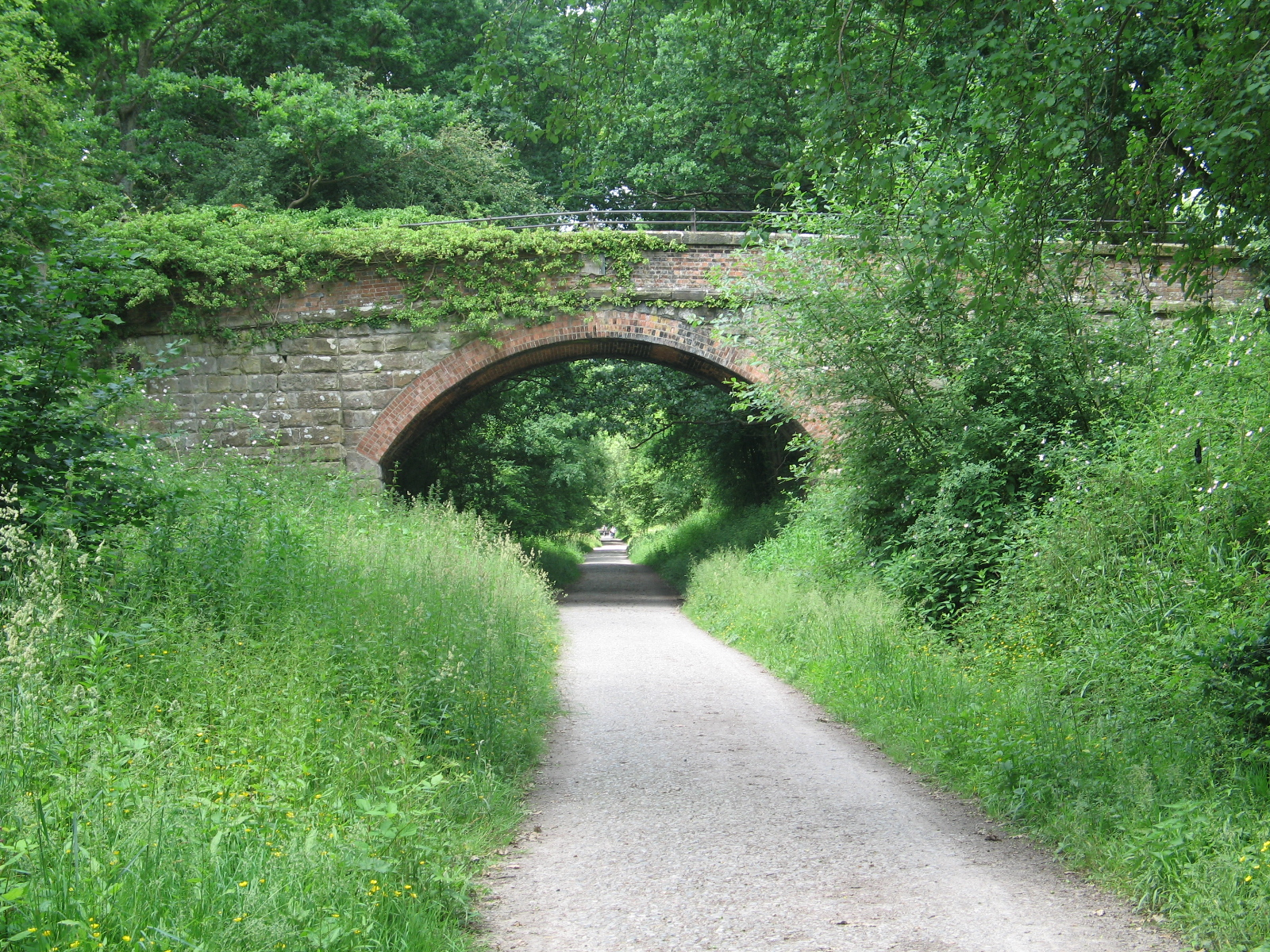
A bridge crossing over the Forest Way.

A flat, surfaced track runs along the entire length of the Forest Way providing easy access for disabled users and an ideal place for children to learn to cycle away from traffic. There are toilet facilities at Forest Row. The western end of the Forest Way links up, at East Grinstead, with the Worth Way which extends as far as Three Bridges.

There are a number of circular trails leading from the Forest Way. These vary in length and difficulty. East Sussex County Council provides leaflets giving information on "Forest Way Country Park and circular walks" and "Forest Row walk".

Along the route trees have regenerated naturally on the embankments and cuttings providing an excellent habitat for swallows, badgers, deer and foxes, in the fields and woodlands.

Forest Way provides access to Weir Wood Reservoir with its bird life and sailing and to Standen country house designed by Philip Webb which contains examples of William Morris designs.

== History ==
In 1866, a railway line, the Three Bridges to Tunbridge Wells Central Line, opened from East Grinstead through to Tunbridge Wells - an extension of the line from Three Bridges. In 1967 it was closed under the Beeching axe. Ironically, Dr. Richard Beeching lived at East Grinstead (adjacent to the line) and regularly travelled up to London on the line when he was Chairman of British Rail. The disused railway line was bought by East Sussex County Council in 1971 and designated as a Country Park in 1974.

Major improvements to the track surface in 2002 led to its inclusion in the Sustrans National Cycle Network. To the west of East Grinstead, the cycle route continues as the Worth Way along the disused section of line to Three Bridges. In addition, there are as yet unrealised plans to link the Forest Way from Groombridge with the Cuckoo Trail, another trail following the route of a disused railway line, which runs from Heathfield to Hampden Park near Eastbourne.
