= Saxon Shore Way =

Long-distance footpath in England

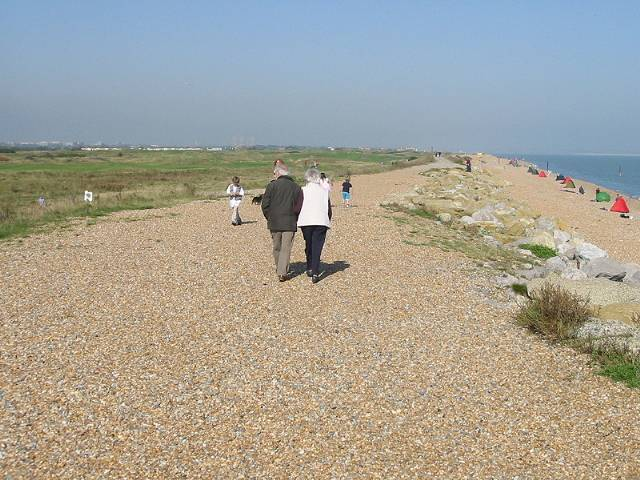
- At Deal beach
- Length: 163 mi (262 km)
- Location: South East England
- Trailheads: Gravesend TQ 647 745; 51.446°N 0.369°E; Hastings TQ 825 094; 50.855°N 0.592°E
- Use: Hiking
- Season: All year

Kent 802AD

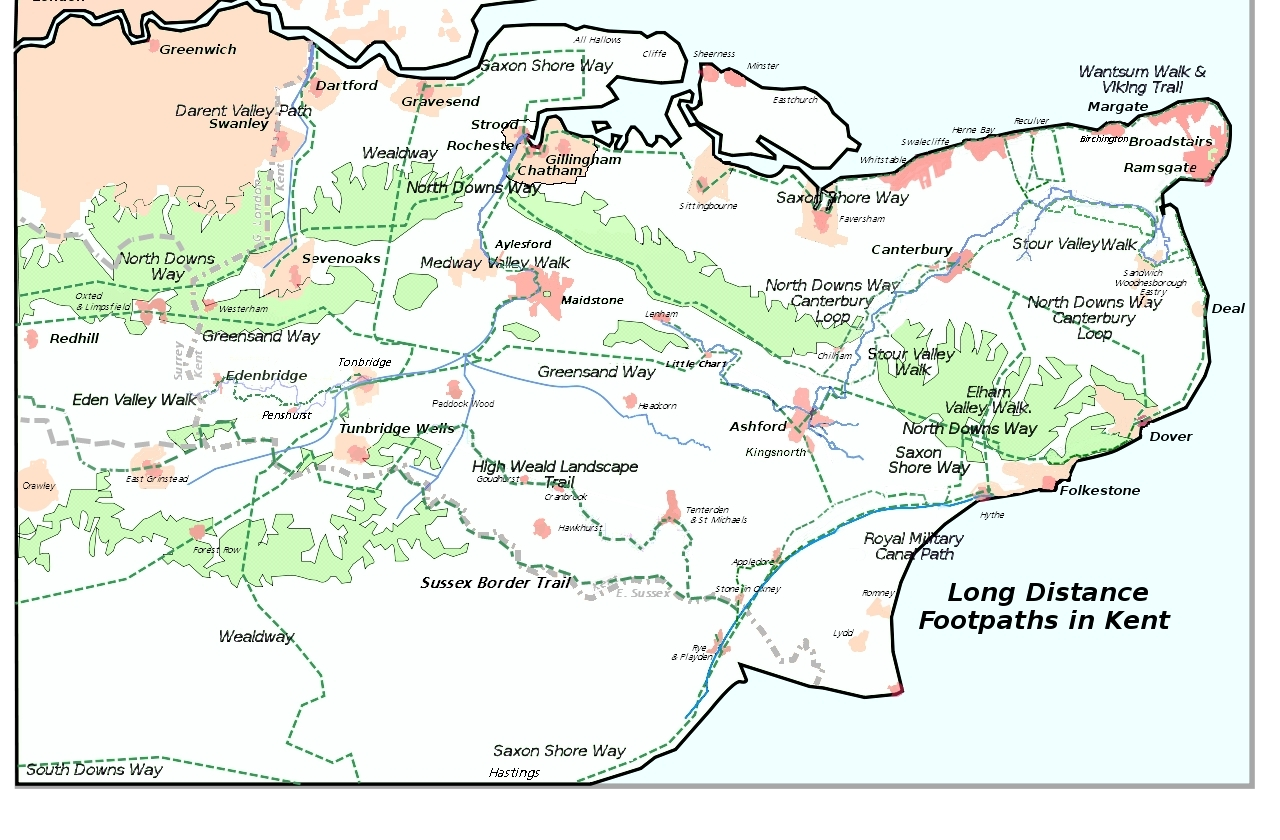
The Saxon Shore Way, and the other long-distance footpaths in Kent.

The Saxon Shore Way is a long-distance footpath in England. It starts at Gravesend, Kent, and traces the coast of South-East England as it was in Roman times as far as Hastings, East Sussex, 163 miles (262 km) in total. This means that around Romney Marsh the route runs significantly inland from the modern coastline.

== History ==
The line of the Roman fortification that the route traces includes ancient forts, modern towns, nature reserves and coastline: four Roman forts built in the fourth century lie along the route, at Reculver, Richborough, Dover and Lympne.

At Seasalter there is an internationally important area for geese, ducks, and waders. The diversity of scenery along the route includes the wide expanses of marshland bordering the Thames and Medway estuaries, the White cliffs of Dover, and panoramic views over Romney Marsh from the escarpment that marks the ancient coastline between Folkestone and Rye.

The Saxon Shore Way was originally opened in 1980, but has since been re-established, and in parts re-routed and extended. It follows the coastline of the South East as it was about 1500 years ago, long before the North Kent Marshes or the Romney Marsh came into existence, when the cliff lines to the north and south extended further into the sea and when the Wantsum Channel provided a thoroughfare for boats between the Isle of Thanet and mainland England. The Way takes its name, the Saxon Shore, from a line of fortifications built along the coastline as it was in the 3rd century AD, towards the end of the Roman period. In this time of crisis Saxon invaders came from the southern regions of modern Denmark and in response the Romans built a line of defensive forts along the coast to repel the newcomers.

== The route ==
=== Gravesend to Faversham ===
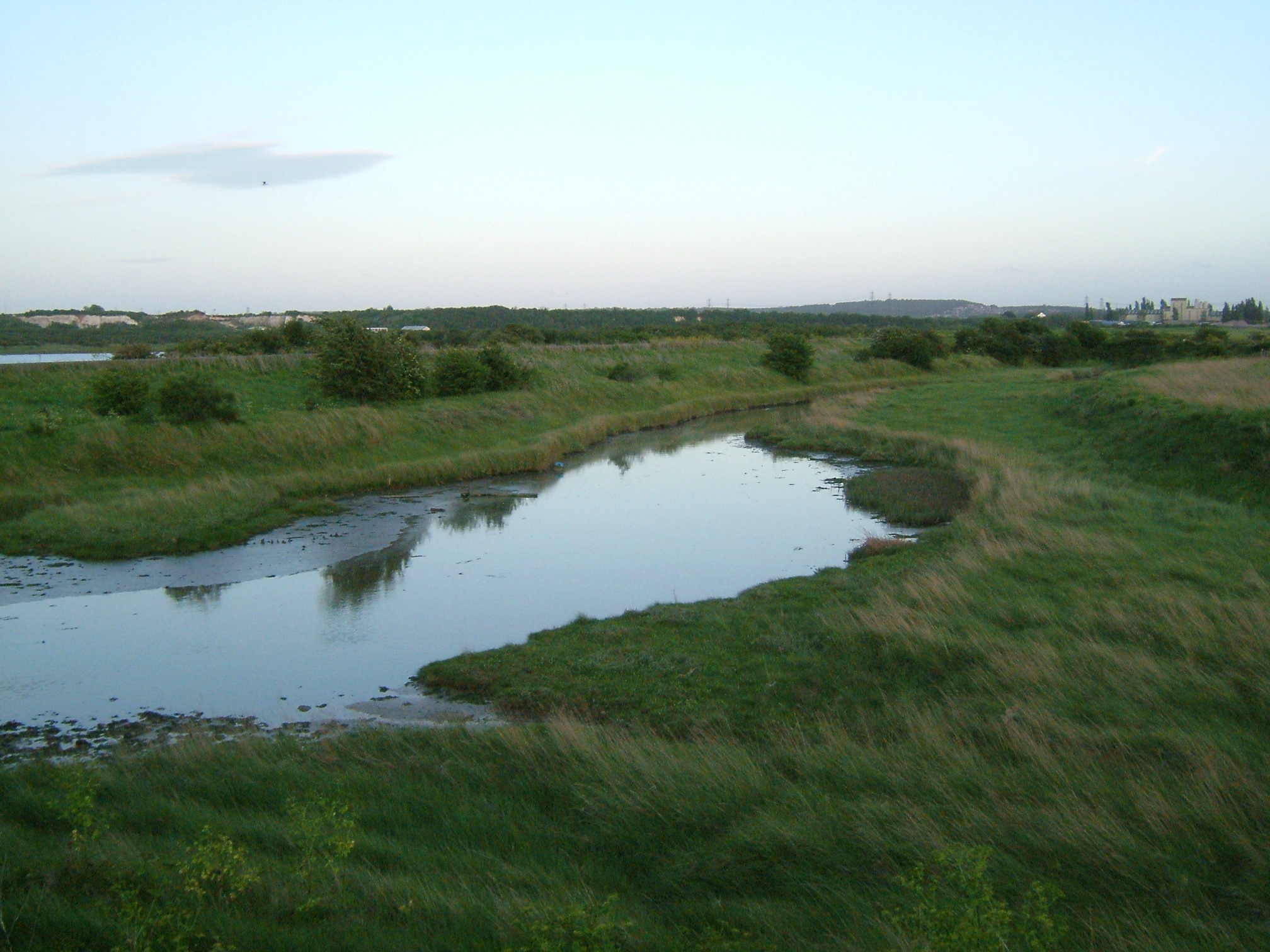
A saline fleet at Cliffe Creek

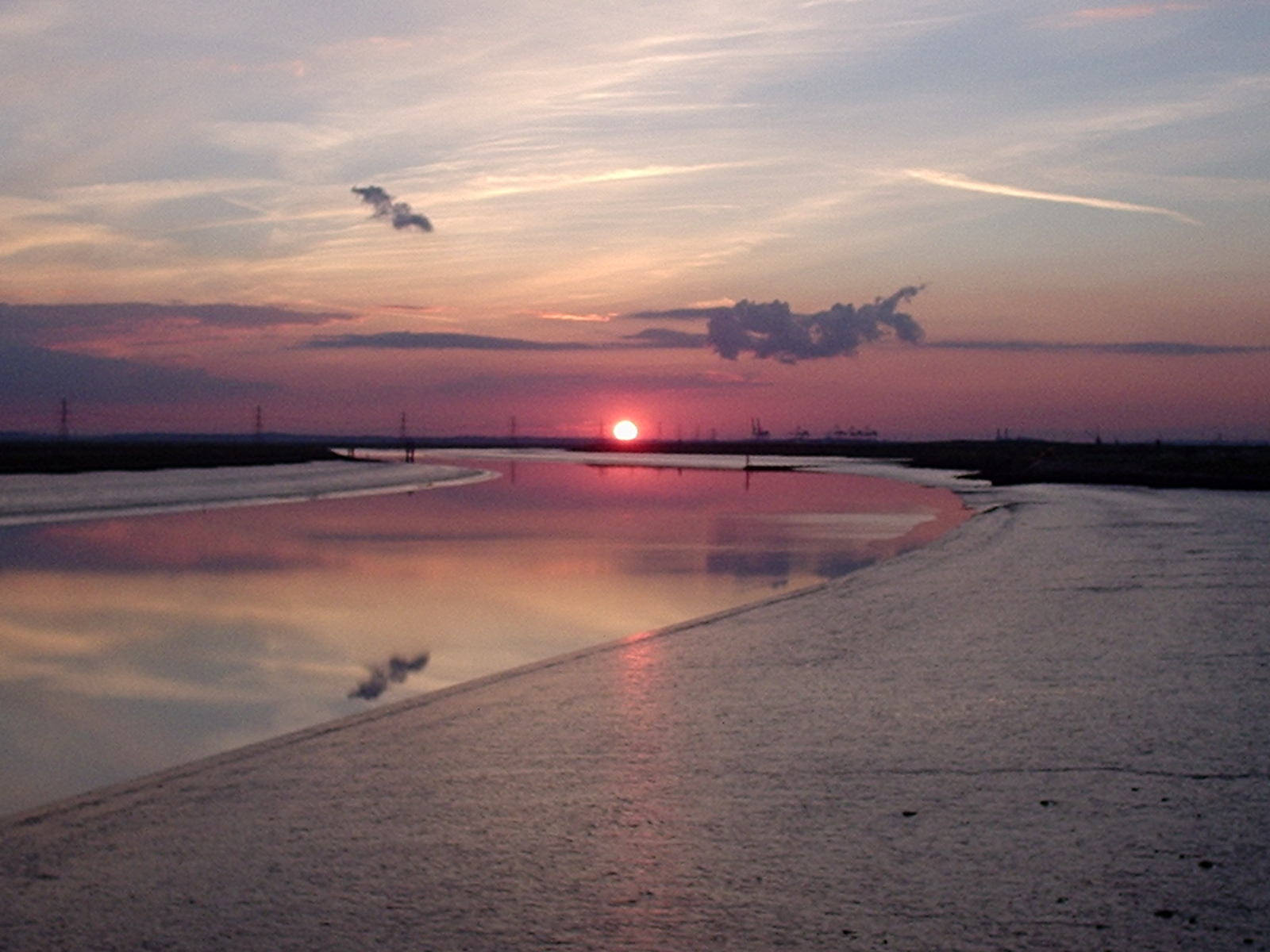
Sunset over The Swale

- Gravesend, Town Pier where it shares a start with the Wealdway; Higham and Cliffe Fort;
- Cliffe; Hoo Peninsula; Strood; Upnor; Rochester, where it meets the Medway Valley Walk; Gillingham;
- Lower Rainham and the Riverside Country Park; Upchurch; along the side of The Swale (past Sittingbourne) and the Oare Marshes bird reserve; Faversham.

=== Faversham ===
- The Faversham area section is from Conyer Creek in the west alongside The Swale, passing through Harty Ferry; Oare; Faversham and on to north of Graveney in the east. The Saxon Shore Way traces the coast as it was in Roman times and follows the line of the Roman fortifications.

=== Faversham to Deal ===
- Faversham; Graveney Marshes; Seasalter; Whitstable; Swalecliffe; Herne Bay; Reculver and the Regulbium Roman Fort where it turns inland, separating from the Thanet Coastal Path;
- Marshside where it meets the Wantsum Walk; Upstreet;
- Plucks Gutter meeting the River Stour and joins the Stour Valley Walk to the Roman Fort at Richborough and Sandwich, meeting the White Cliffs Country Trail; Deal

=== Deal to Dover ===
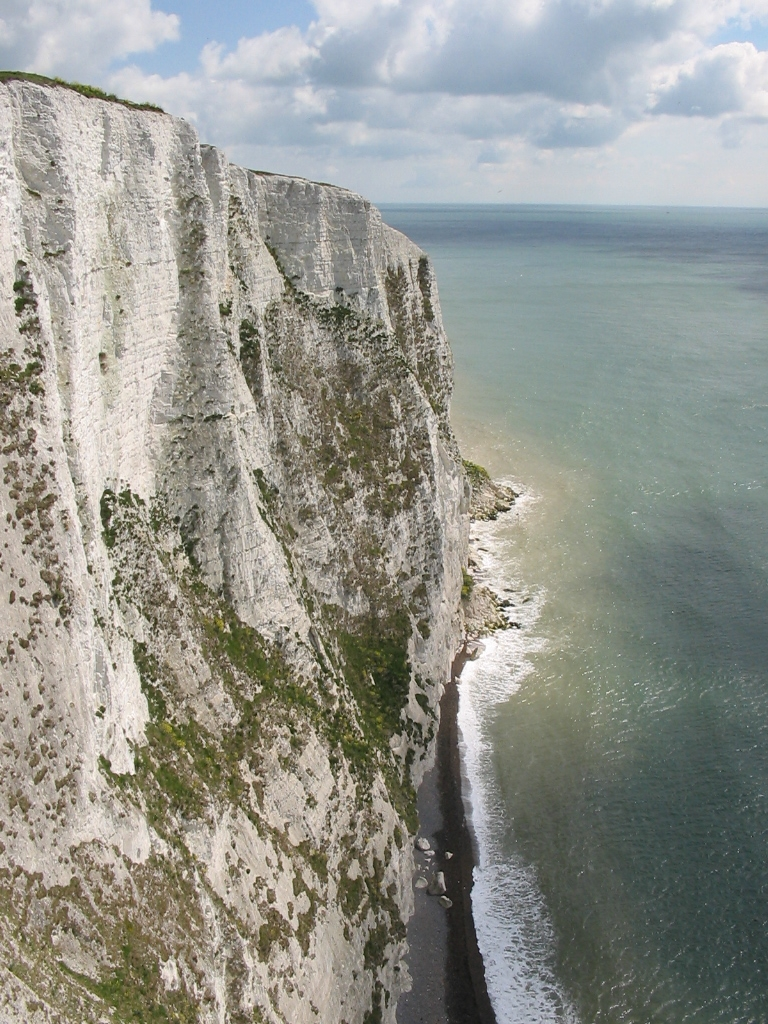
A view of the cliffs from the path.

- The most picturesque part of the walk is arguably, the clifftop stretch between Deal and Dover passing South Foreland, with a midway break in St Margaret's at Cliffe.

=== Dover to Rye ===
- As the walk follows the old coast line it heads inland to Lympne, Aldington (still part of the Saxon Shore Parish) and Kenardington via Hamstreet woods nature reserve where it meets the Greensand Way, before heading for Rye.

=== Rye ===
- The Saxon Shore Way links with the 1066 Country Walk at Rye, East Sussex.

=== Rye to Hastings ===
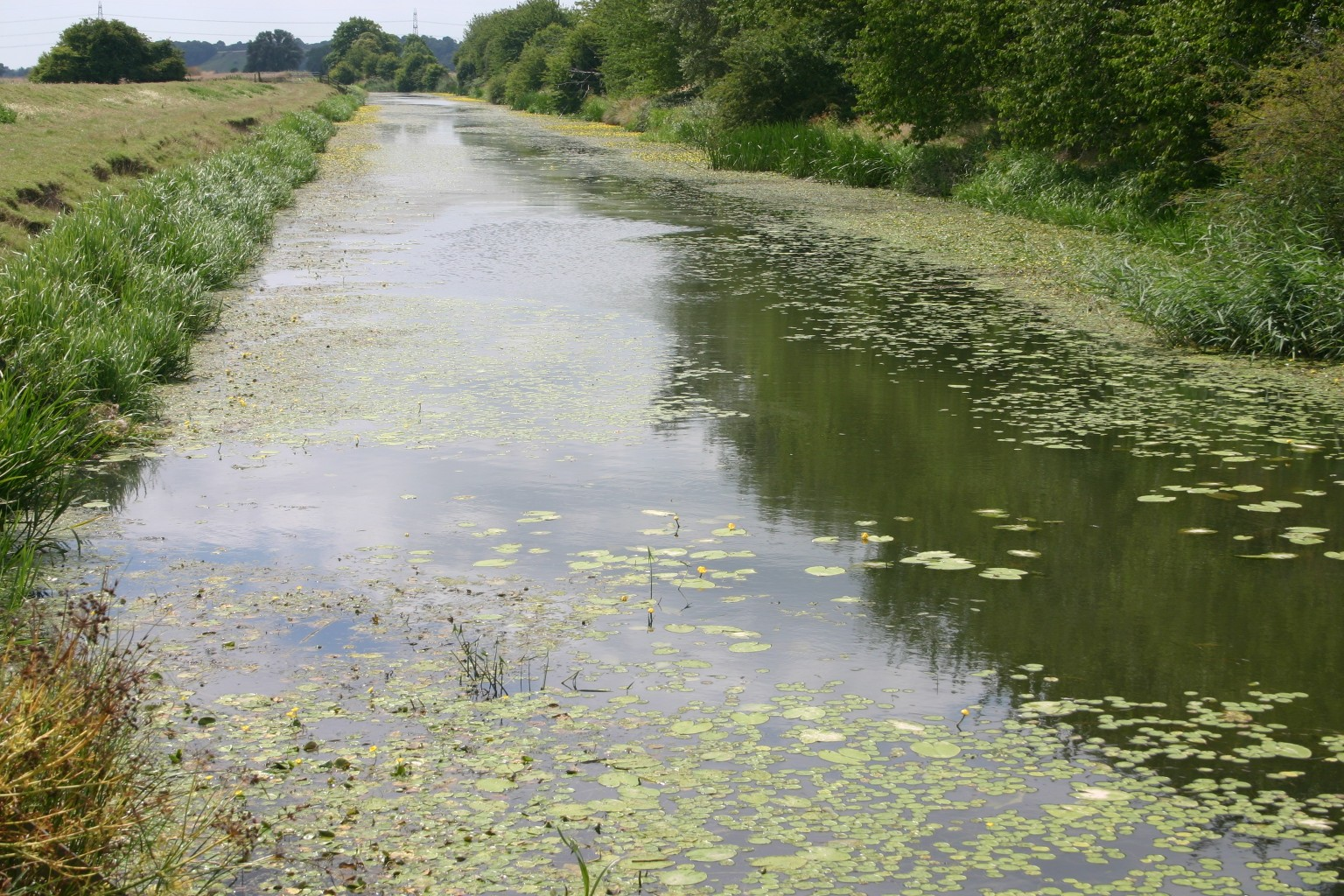
The Royal Military Canal near Rye

- The walk leaves Rye, following the Royal Military Canal as far as Winchelsea and then on to Hastings.

== See also ==
- Greensand Way
- South England flood of February 1287
