= Sussex Border Path =

150-mile footpath in southern England

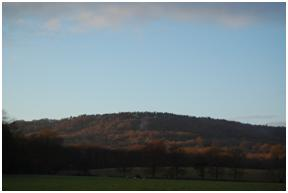
- Blackdown is the highest point on the Sussex Border Path and in Sussex, January 2009
- Length: 150 miles (240 km)
- Location: South Eastern England, United Kingdom
- Designation: Long-distance footpath
- Trailheads: Thorney Island, West Sussex; 50°49′16″N 0°55′16″W; Rye, East Sussex; 50°56′56″N 0°43′44″E
- Use: Hiking
- Elevation change: 3,130 m (10,270 ft)
- Highest point: Blackdown, 280 m (920 ft)
- Difficulty: Easy
- Season: All year
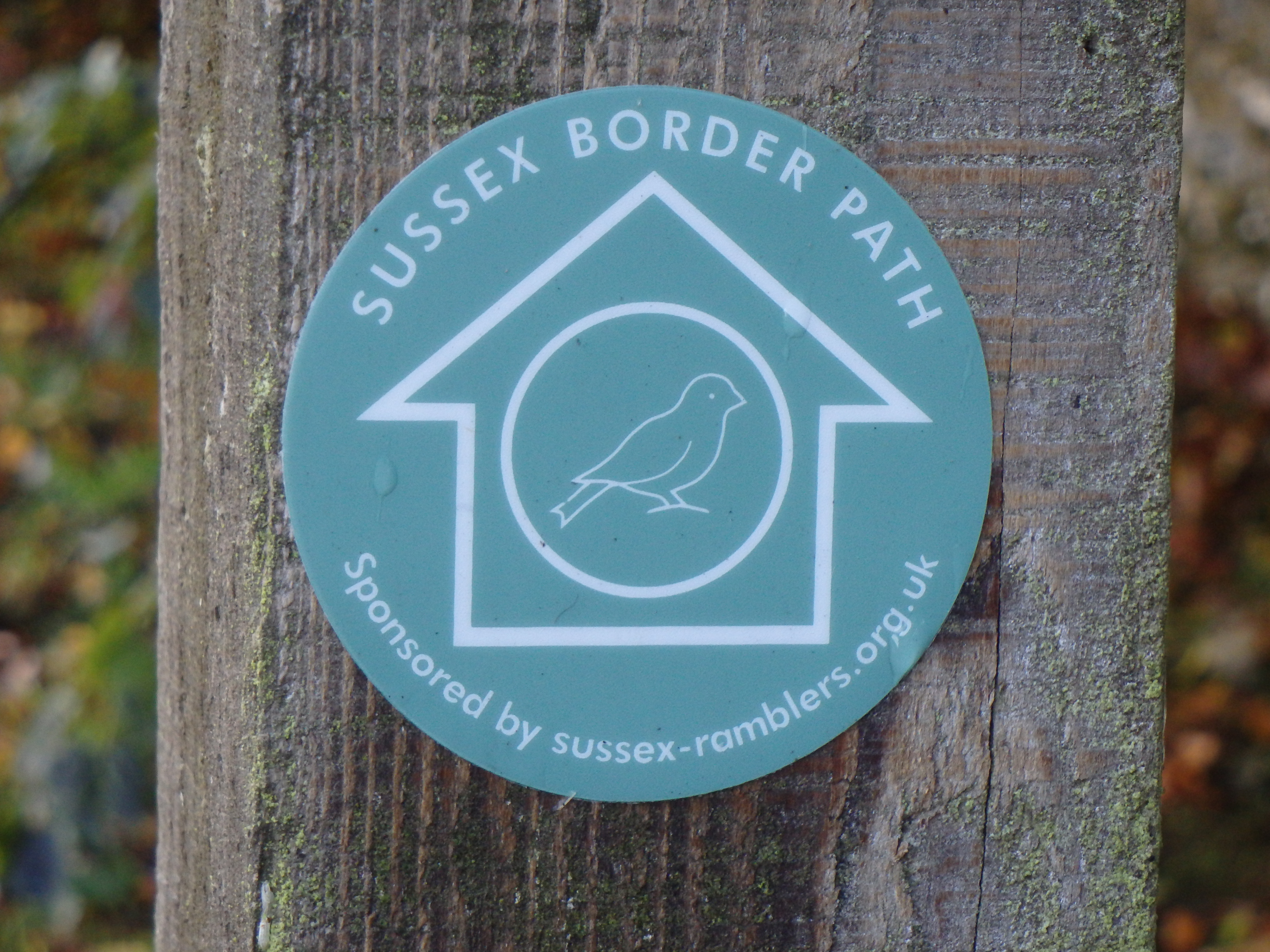
- Waymark

The Sussex Border Path is a long-distance footpath around the borders of Sussex, a historic county and former medieval kingdom in southern England. The main path is 150 miles (240 km) long and stays close to Sussex's borders with Hampshire, Surrey and Kent, connecting Thorney Island (50.821°N 0.921°W) to Rye (50.949°N 0.729°E). There is also an additional 33-mile (53 km) spur known as the Mid Sussex Link, which links East Grinstead with Fishersgate and Mile Oak on the western boundary of the city of Brighton and Hove.

The Sussex Border Path is not a National Trail, but since the Sussex stretch of the England Coast Path National Trail was completed in February 2026, the combination of these two paths (known as the Sussex Lap) has formed a route allowing a complete walk around the county.

== History ==
The path was first devised and published in 1983 by Ben Perkins and Aeneas Macintosh. The footpath uses existing rights of way to follow the Sussex county border and is waymarked. It is managed by volunteer teams from the Sussex area of the Ramblers. The path is waymarked with signs showing a martlet, the heraldic bird found on the Sussex flag and heraldic shield.

Sussex's external boundaries probably crystallised around the 6th and 7th centuries. To the west, Bede describes the boundary with the Kingdom of Wessex as being opposite the Isle of Wight, and which later fell on the River Ems. To the east at Romney Marsh and the River Limen (now called the River Rother or Kent Ditch), Sussex shared a border with the Kingdom of Kent. North of the Forest Ridge in the Wealden forest lay the sub-kingdom of Surrey, which became a frontier area disputed by various kingdoms until it later became part of Wessex.

In 1974 the area of Sussex was divided into two ceremonial counties, East and West Sussex, and Sussex continues to formally exist as a historic county. The Mid Sussex Link follows the boundary between the current ceremonial counties of East and West Sussex.

== Route ==
The Sussex Border Path begins at Thorney Island, now effectively a peninsula that juts into Chichester Harbour. The path forms a 9-mile (14 km) circuit around the island; it then extends across the South Coast Plain to Emsworth on the Hampshire side of the River Ems, the river which forms the Sussex-Hampshire border at this location. The path continues over the chalk ridge of the South Downs and onto the Greensand Ridge of the western Weald. Here the trail ascends Blackdown, the highest point in Sussex at 280 metres (920 ft) and the highest point on the Sussex Border Path.

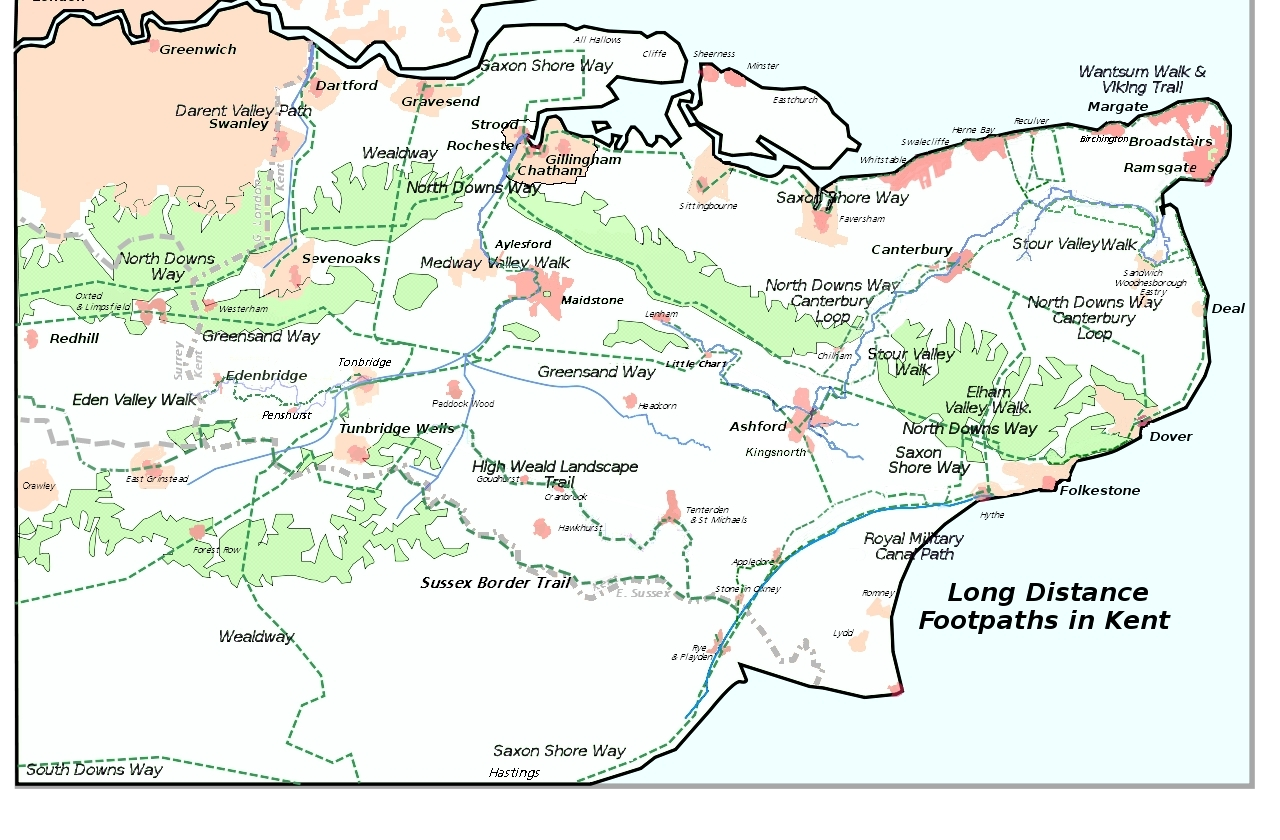
The eastern section of the Sussex Border Path is shown in relation to the county of Kent, which shares a border with Sussex.

From Blackdown, the path continues into the Low Weald to Gatwick Airport and into the High Weald to the town of East Grinstead. From here the path descends to the Romney marshes to end in the historic town of Rye.

The Mid Sussex Link begins at East Grinstead and passes through Sharpthorne and Scaynes Hill to Ditchling, then over the South Downs to Fishersgate, between Southwick and Portslade.

== Image gallery ==
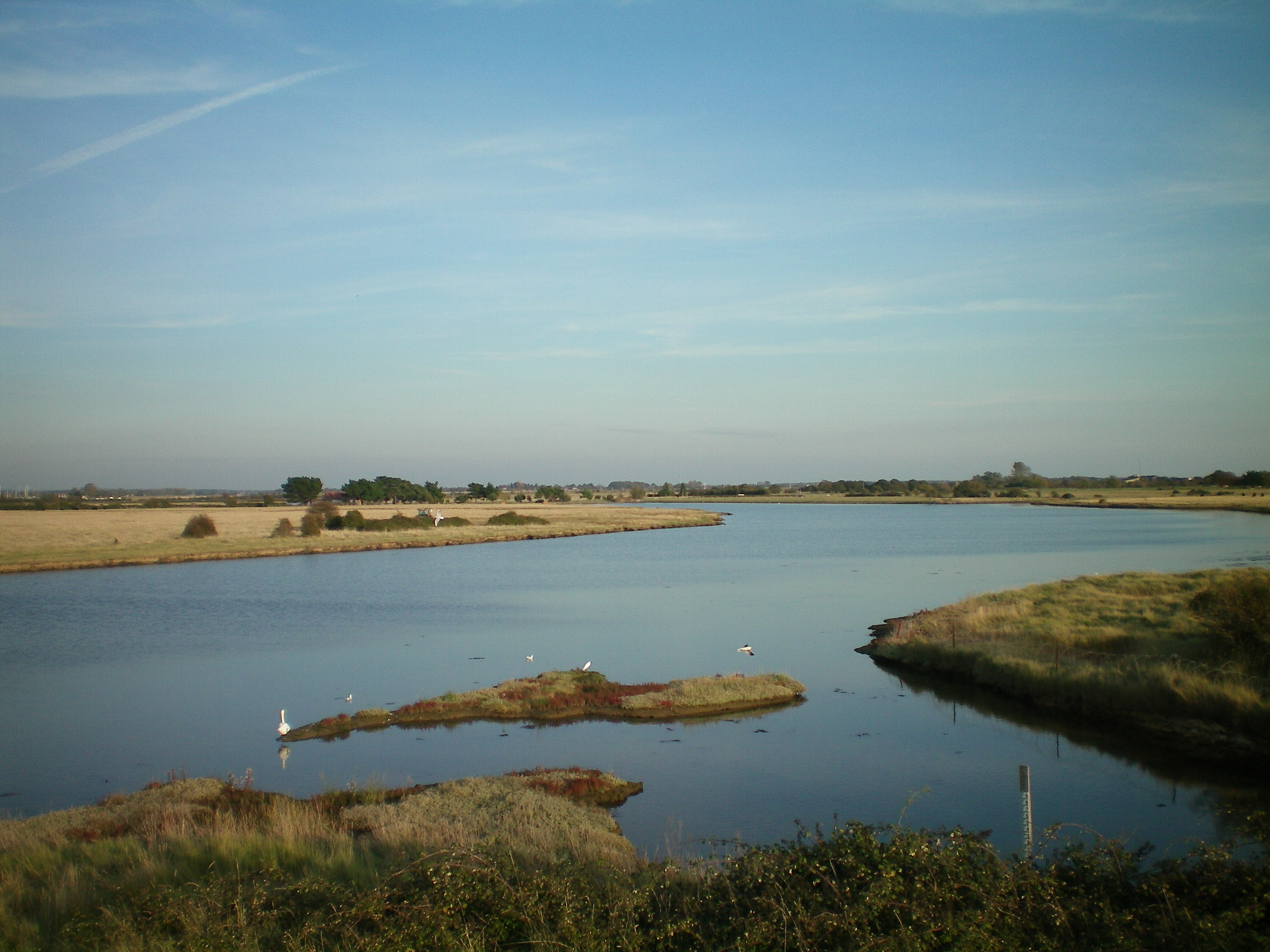
Great Deep separates Thorney Island from the mainland

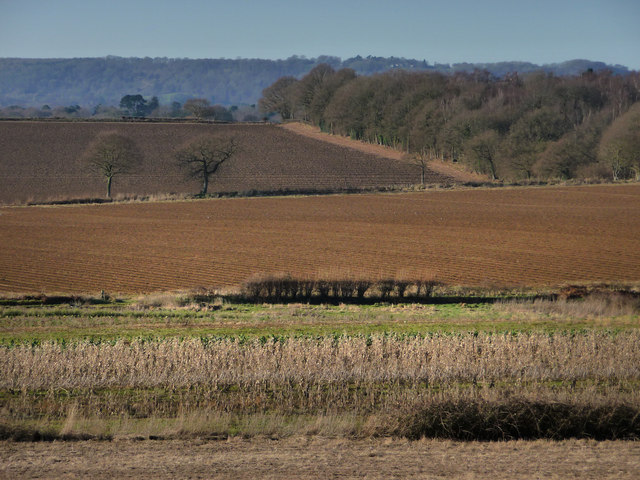
Farmland near Rogate

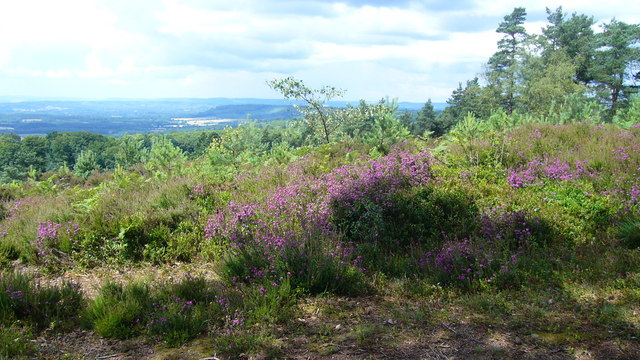
Near Blackdown

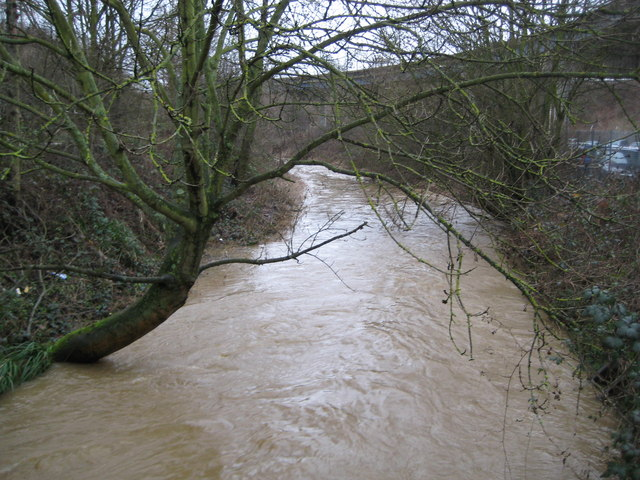
The Gatwick Stream near Gatwick Airport

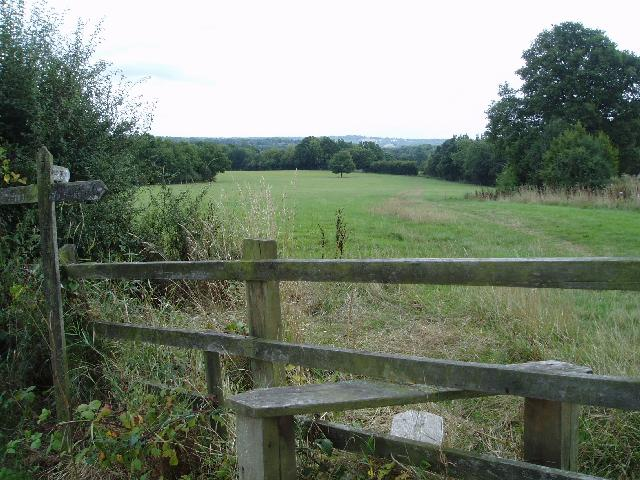
Near Crawley Down

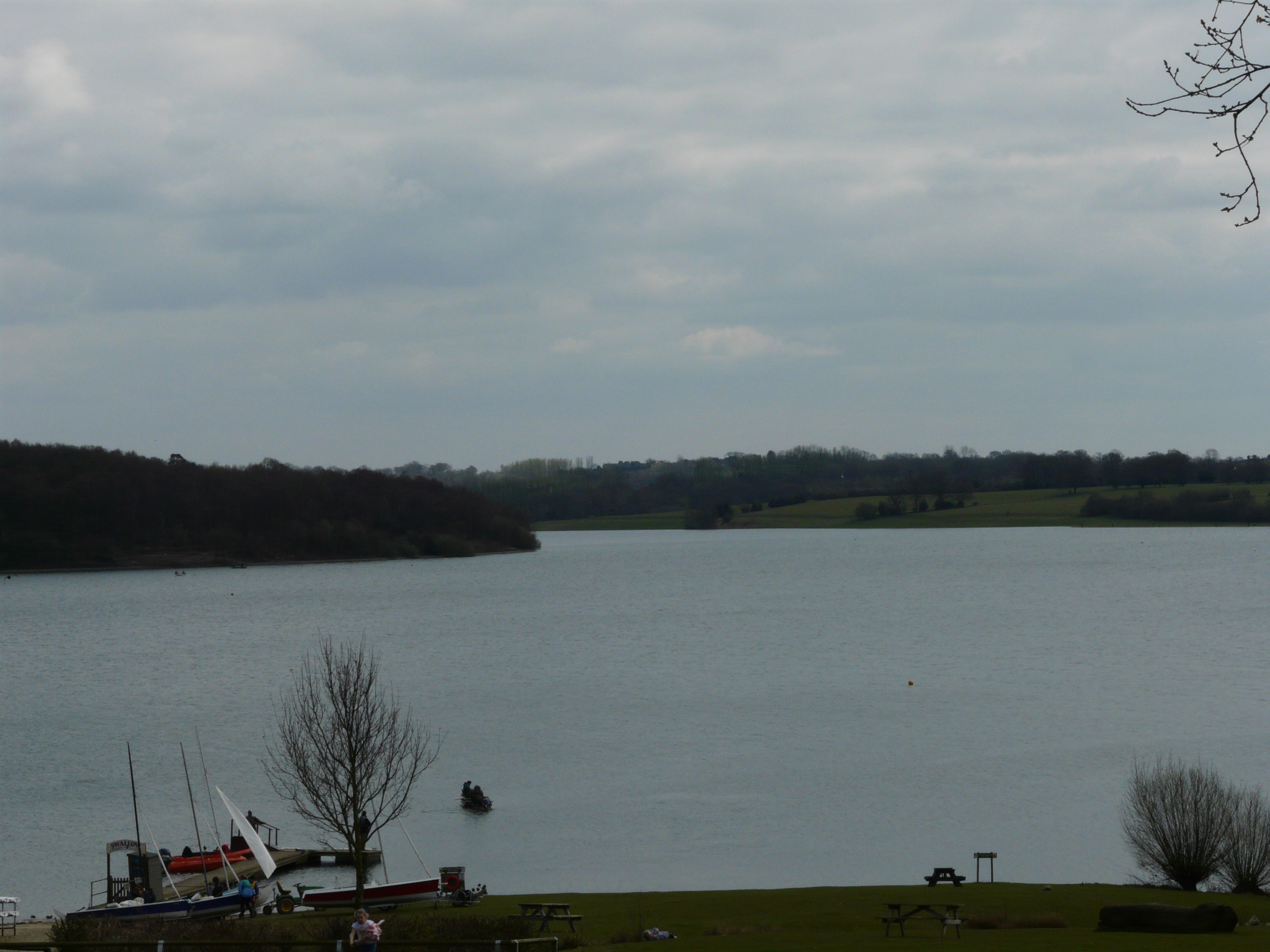
Bewl Water

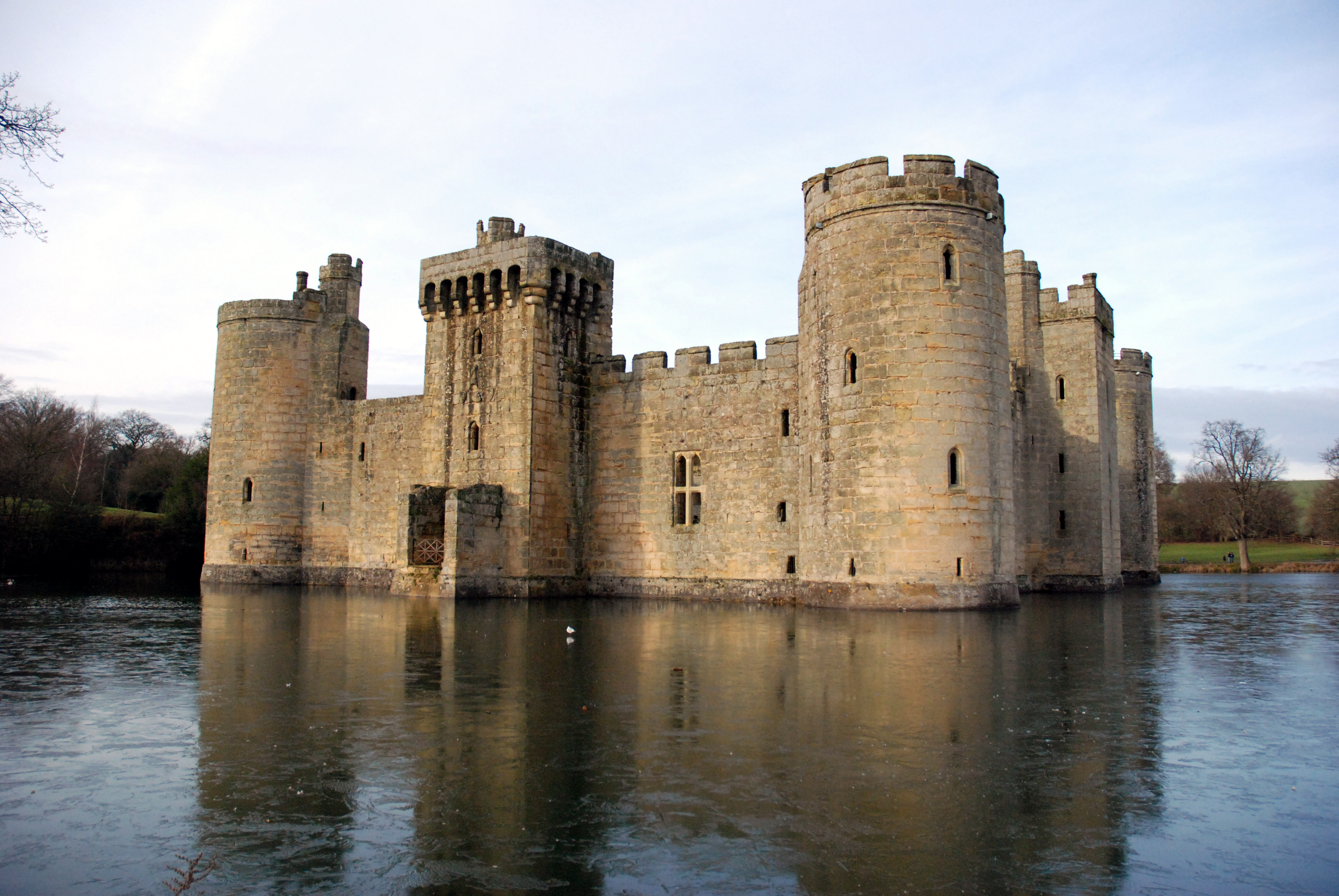
Bodiam Castle

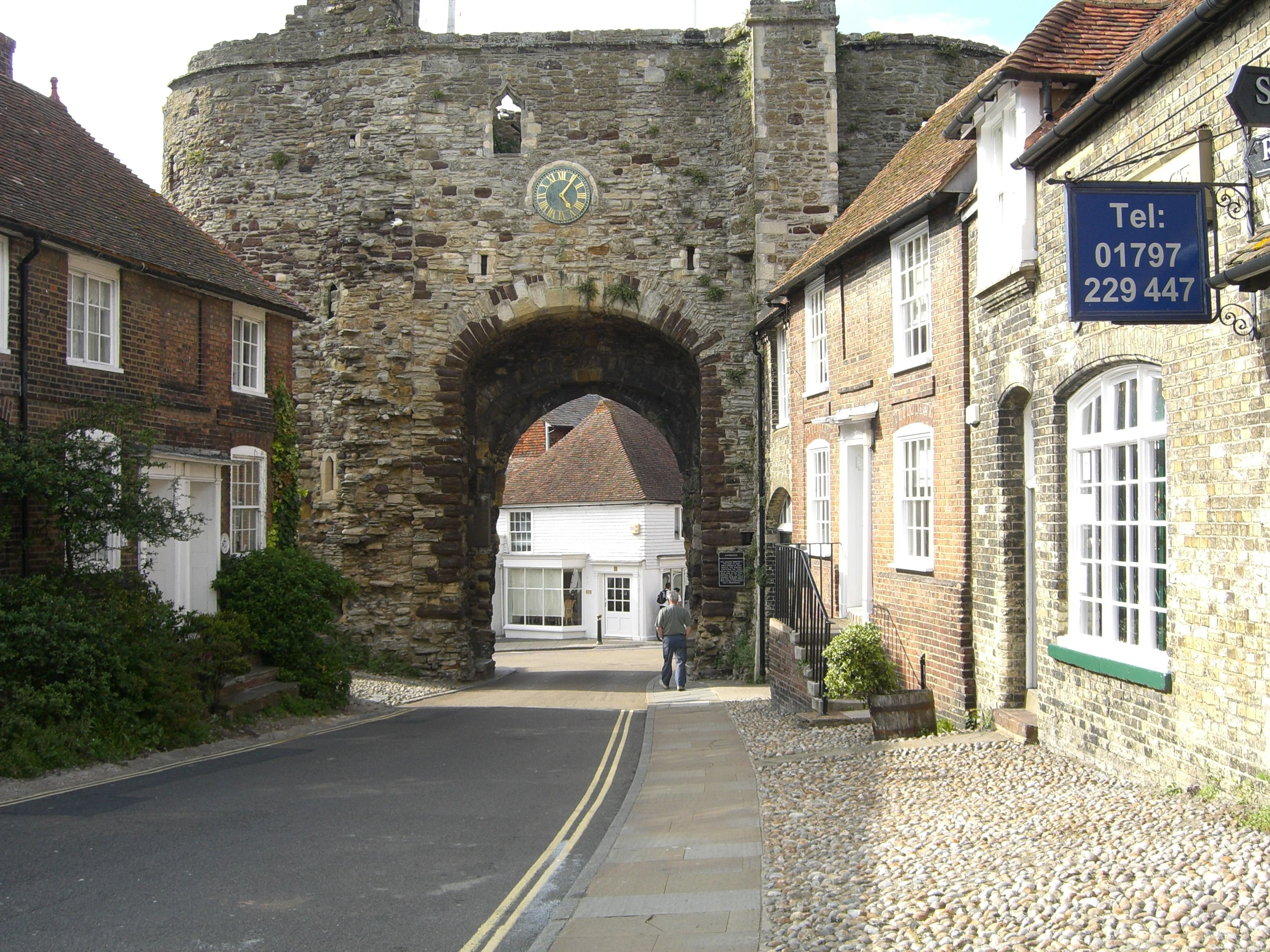
The town of Rye marks the eastern terminus of the Sussex Border Path

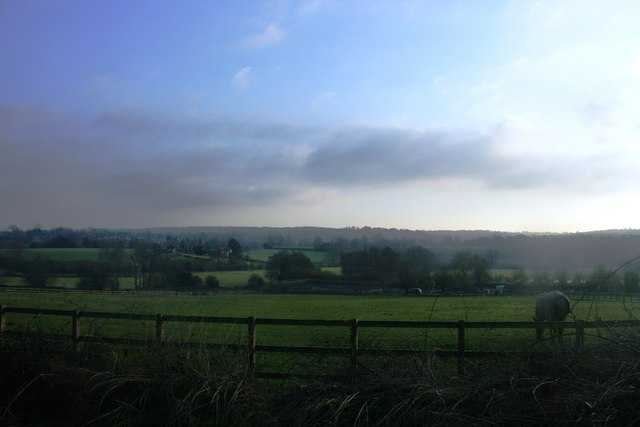
A section of the Mid Sussex Link shared with the Forest Way, following a former railway line between East Grinstead and Groombridge

== See also ==
- South Downs Way
- The Four Men: a Farrago
