= Wealdway =

83-mile footpath in southern England

The Wealdway, Kent and East Sussex, is a public footpath that runs for 83 miles / 134 km from Gravesend, Kent on the Thames estuary, to the A259 at Eastbourne, 3 km north of Beachy Head.

== Interrelation with other long-distance routes ==
This is the only north-south route from the Thames Estuary east of London and west of the Medway Towns. It crosses the North Downs, Higher and Lower, Kentish and Sussex Weald (see Kent long distance walks here) and starts at Gravesend. Here there is a regular ferry link to Tilbury and routes north of the Thames. At the south is Eastbourne the start of the South Downs Way overlooking the south coast. The route provides access to coast routes: a return circuit for users of the Saxon Shore Way.

== History ==
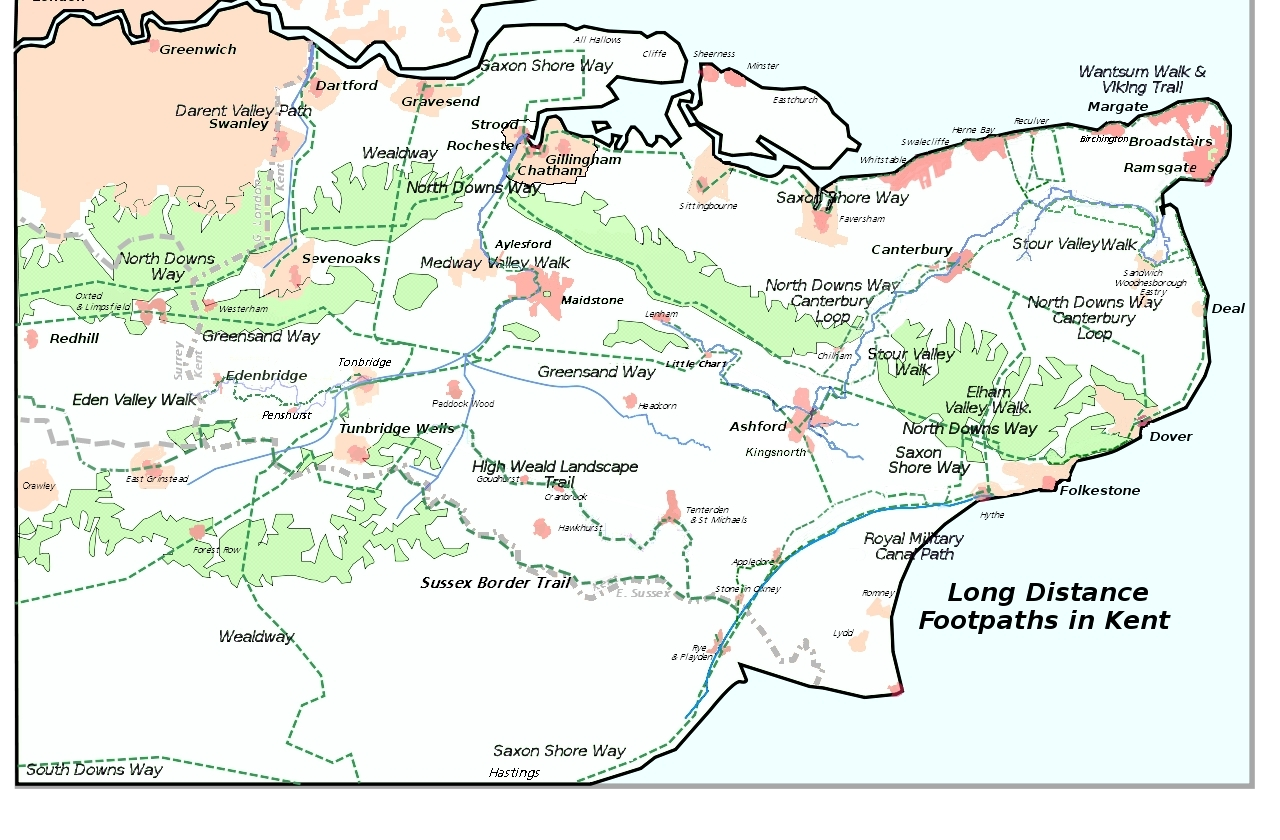
The Wealdway, and the other Kent long-distance footpaths.

The Wealdway was conceived in 1970 by members of the Ramblers' Association. The first route descriptions were published in the mid seventies, but the poor state of the rights of way between Uckfield and Eastbourne delayed publication until 1981. Motorway Construction work and the building of the Tonbridge Flood Relief Barrier forced many changes to the original route.

== Route ==
The Geology of the Weald

=== From the Thames Estuary ===
The route goes through Gravesend; crosses the A2 at Tollgate; goes southward through Sole Street and Luddesdown; climbs to the North Downs Way at Trottiscliffe/Vigo Village; descends the scarp slope of the North Downs; crosses the M20 and A20; goes through Platt and Mereworth Woods to Gover Hill, where the Medway valley comes into view; goes down to West Peckham, Barnes Street and thus to the Medway; takes the riverside path upstream for a full 6 miles (9.7 km), through Tonbridge to Hayesden; heads due south, under the railway and under the Tonbridge bypass; climbs to the ridge at Bidborough through to Modest Corner, Southborough; and follows a mixture of paths and roads to the A264, at Stone Cross.

=== From the Kent borders ===
The route crosses into Sussex, following the medium height contours; drops down into the upper Medway valley wending its way to Withyham; follows a metalled drive, with good views to the north and south, leading to Five Hundred Acre Wood, the inspiration for A. A. Milne's, Christopher Robin and Winnie the Pooh books – the wood was first enclosed in 1693 and the path dedicated as a right of way by the owner in 1970; rises to Greenwood Gate Clump, at the top of the Ashdown Forest 720 ft (220 m) above mean sea level; continues on high ground to Camp Hill and on to Browns Brook Cottage; progresses to Buxted Park, Uckfield; rounds Blackboys, with its Youth Hostel; traverses East Hoathly and Chiddingly; negotiates Gun Hill walking through arable and pasture interspersed with coppice; descends into the Cuckmere valley at Hellingly through to the A22 south of Horsebridge; passes through Upper Dicker; crosses the River Cuckmere to get to Arlington; passes Wilmington and its 226 ft (69 m) high chalk figure, the Long Man; climbs then falls towards Jevington; climbs to Willingdon Hill, 659 ft (201 m); journeys 2 miles (3.2 km) downhill to the Eastbourne Youth Hostel on the A259 and optionally continues along the footway to the resort itself.
